= PLEX =

PLEX or Plex may refer to:

- PLEX (programming language), a special-purpose, concurrent, real-time programming language
- Plex Inc., an American company that develops a client–server media player platform and streaming media services
- Plex Systems, a software company based in Troy, Michigan
- IBM Plex, an open source typeface superfamily
- Pangasinan Link Expressway, a proposed expressway in the Philippines
- Pilot License Extension, an item in the video game Eve Online that adds game time to an account
- Plasma exchange, a type of plasmapheresis where patient's blood plasma is removed and blood products are given in replacement
- Plex, a robotic character on the children's television series Yo Gabba Gabba!
