= N213 highway =

Secondary road in the Philippines

Route 213
- Mabalacat–Magalang Road; Magalang–Concepcion Road; Concepcion–Capas Road
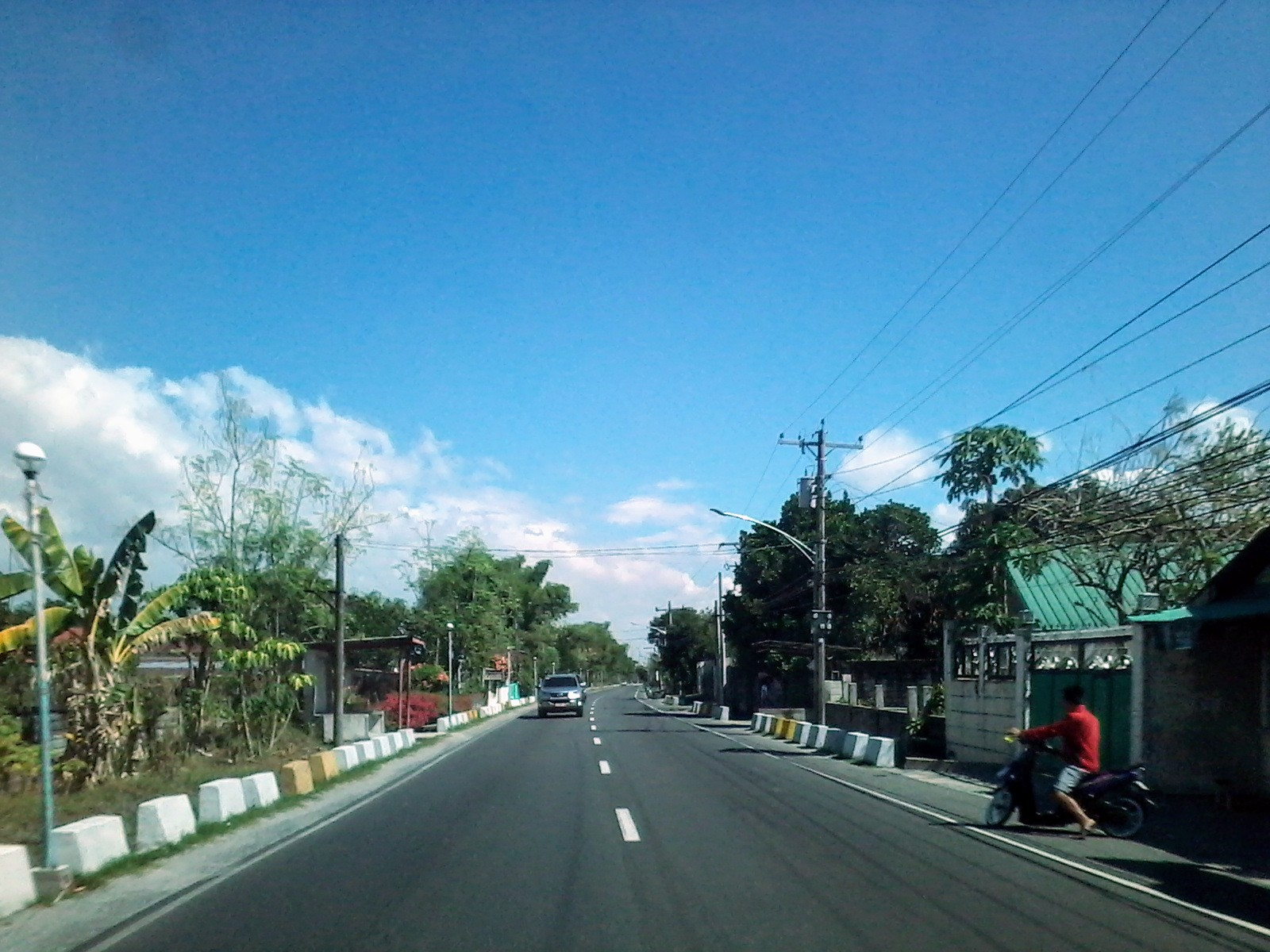
- Mabalacat–Magalang Road in Magalang, Pampanga, facing eastbound. It is a component of N213.

Route information
- Maintained by Department of Public Works and Highways
- Length: 23 km (14 mi)

Major junctions
- North end: N2 (MacArthur Highway) in Capas, Tarlac
- E1 (Subic–Clark–Tarlac Expressway) at Concepcion Exit in Concepcion, Tarlac; Magalang–Arayat–Santa Ana Road in Magalang; E1 (North Luzon Expressway) / Mabalacat–Atlu Bola Bypass Road at Santa Ines Exit in Mabalacat, Pampanga; N2 (MacArthur Highway) in Mabalacat, Pampanga
- South end: Gil Puyat Avenue / Clark–Mabalacat–Angeles Road in Clark Freeport, Mabalacat Gate

Location
- Country: Philippines
- Provinces: Tarlac, Pampanga
- Major cities: Mabalacat
- Towns: Capas, Concepcion, Magalang

Highway system
- Roads in the Philippines; Highways; Expressways; List
← N212	→ N214

National Route 213 (N213) forms a part of the Philippine highway network. It is a two-lane national secondary road spanning 23 kilometers (14 mi) which traverses eastern towns within Tarlac and Pampanga provinces.

== Route Description ==
Route 213 starts at the rotunda fronting the Subic–Clark–Tarlac Expressway in Mabalacat, at the entrance to the Clark Freeport and Special Economic Zone and heads eastward towards the intersection with Manila North Road and continues eastward towards the terminus of North Luzon Expressway in Barangay Santa Ines and goes over it towards numerous housing developments, subdivisions, and resettlement areas towards the town of Magalang and towards the junction in Barangay Dolores, where it then turns sharply north and follows the Magalang–Concepcion Road alignment. It then crosses Dolores and Sacobia Rivers and lands at the town of Concepcion in Tarlac, crosses over the Parua River just outside the town proper of Concepcion, towards the Concepcion Exit of the Subic–Clark–Tarlac Expressway. The road crosses another river canal past the expressway exit and curves to the left towards the town of Capas, then makes a sharp turn at the junction with Capas–Santa Rosa Road, enters the town proper, and finally ends at the junction with Manila North Road.

== Intersections ==
Intersections are numbered by kilometer posts, with Rizal Park in Manila designated as kilometer zero.

Province	City/Municipality	km	mi	Destinations	Notes
Pampanga	Mabalacat			Gil Puyat Avenue / Clark–Mabalacat–Angeles Road — Clark, New Clark City, Angeles	Southern terminus.
Pampanga	Mabalacat			N2 (Manila North Road) – Tarlac, Pangasinan, Manila, Bulacan	Southbound to E1 (Clark Spur Road Mabiga Exit); northbound to E1 (SCTEX Dolores Exit)
Pampanga	Mabalacat			E1 (NLEX Santa Ines Interchange) / Mabalacat–Atlu Bola Bypass Road – Manila, Malolos, San Fernando	Santa Ines Interchange bridge going over the terminus of North Luzon Expressway.
Pampanga	Mabalacat			Hon. Modesto Santos Street	
Pampanga	Mabalacat			San Fernando Avenue	
Pampanga	Magalang			Tinabang–San Isidro Road	
Pampanga	Magalang			Dolores Diversion Road	South end of diversion road.
Pampanga	Magalang			N213 (Magalang–Concepcion Road) / Magalang–Arayat Road – Arayat, Santa Ana, Angeles	Southbound to Angeles, Arayat & Santa Ana. N213 follows Magalang–Concepcion Road northward.
Pampanga	Magalang			Dolores Diversion Road	North end of diversion road.
Pampanga	Magalang			San Roque–Navaling Road	Access to Brgy. Navaling in Magalang.
Pampanga	Magalang			Navaling Road	Highway access to Brgy. Navaling in Magalang.
Tarlac	Concepcion			Ipil-Ipil Street (Juan Luna Street)	Access to Concepcion town proper.
Tarlac	Concepcion			E1 (SCTEX Concepcion Exit) – Manila, Pangasinan, Tarlac City	
Tarlac	Concepcion			Concepcion–La Paz Road — La Paz, Tarlac City, Zaragoza	Access to Tarlac City and Cabanatuan via La Paz.
Tarlac	Concepcion			San Juan–Santo Niño Road	
Tarlac	Capas			Capas–Santa Rosa Road — Tarlac City	
Tarlac	Capas			N2 (Manila North Road) – Tarlac City, Pangasinan, Manila, New Clark City	Northern terminus.
1.000 mi = 1.609 km; 1.000 km = 0.621 mi
