= Plaridel Bypass Road =

Provincial highway in Bulacan, Philippines

Plaridel Bypass Road

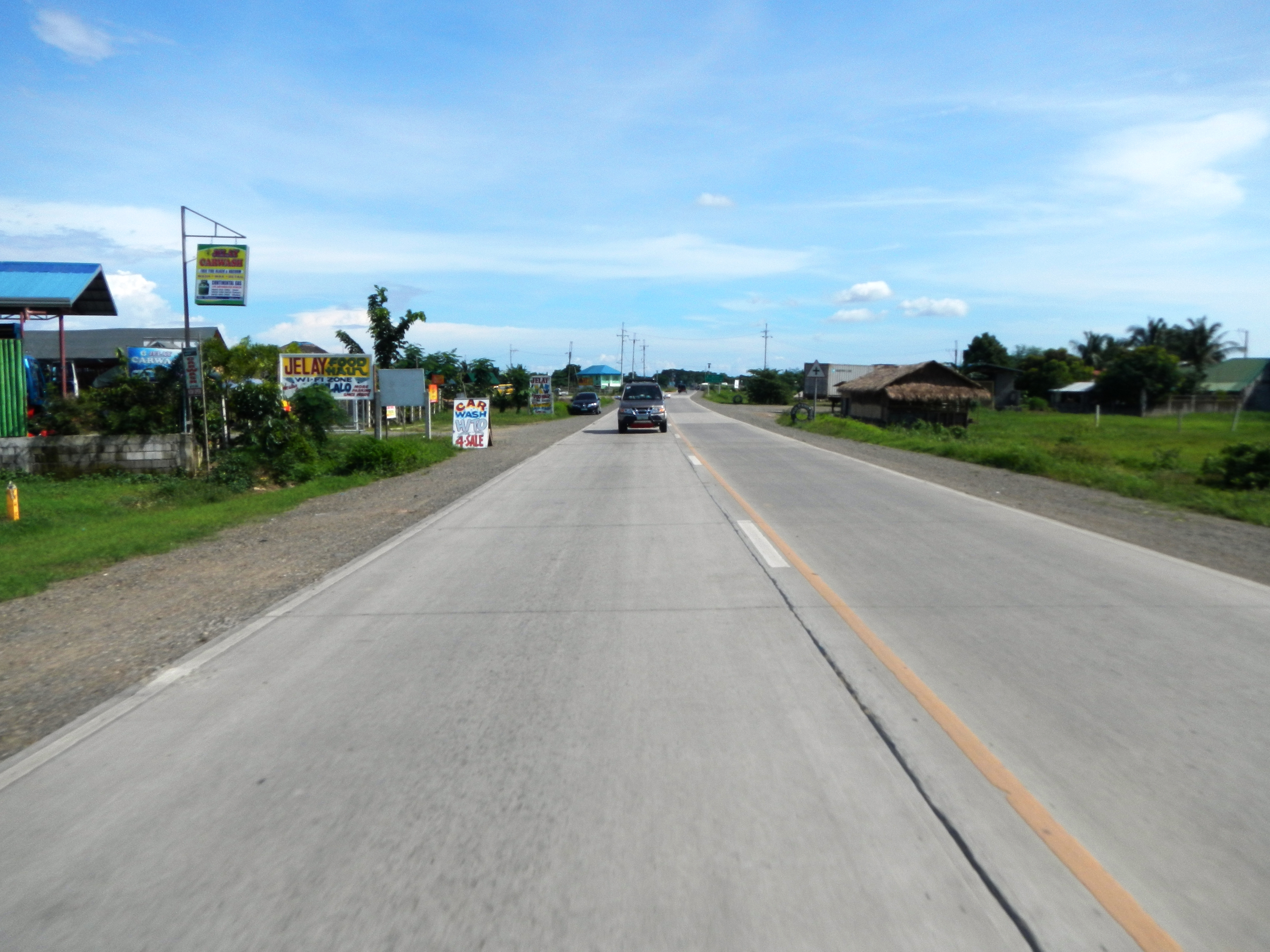
- The road in Bustos, Bulacan

Route information
- Maintained by Department of Public Works and Highways
- Length: 24.61 km (15.29 mi)
- Existed: 2012–present

Major junctions
- North end: AH26 (Pan-Philippine Highway) in San Rafael
- Balagtas Service Road in Balagtas; Plaridel Bypass Access Road in Plaridel; Pandi–Bustos Road in Bustos; Gen. Alejo G. Santos Highway in Bustos; Mayor Francisco Viola Highway in San Rafael; Mabalas-balas Road in San Rafael
- South end: AH26 (North Luzon Expressway) in Balagtas

Location
- Country: Philippines
- Provinces: Bulacan
- Towns: Balagtas; Guiguinto; Plaridel; Bustos; San Rafael

Highway system
- Roads in the Philippines; Highways; Expressways; List
← N243	→ N301

Plaridel Bypass Road is a 24.61-kilometer (15.29 mi) national secondary road in the province of Bulacan, Philippines. Traversing agricultural lands, it bypasses the town proper of Plaridel (after which it is named), Pulilan, Baliwag, and San Rafael and serves as an alternative route to the Pan-Philippine Highway.

The entire road is designated as National Route 247 (N247) of the Philippine highway network.

== Route description ==
From the south, the two- to four-lane bypass road starts at Balagtas Exit of North Luzon Expressway in Barangay Borol 2nd, Balagtas. It turns north, bypassing the town propers of Guiguinto, Plaridel, Pulilan, Baliwag, and San Rafael; It also traverses the town of Bustos. It ends at its intersection with Pan-Philippine Highway in Barangay Maasim, San Rafael.

== History ==
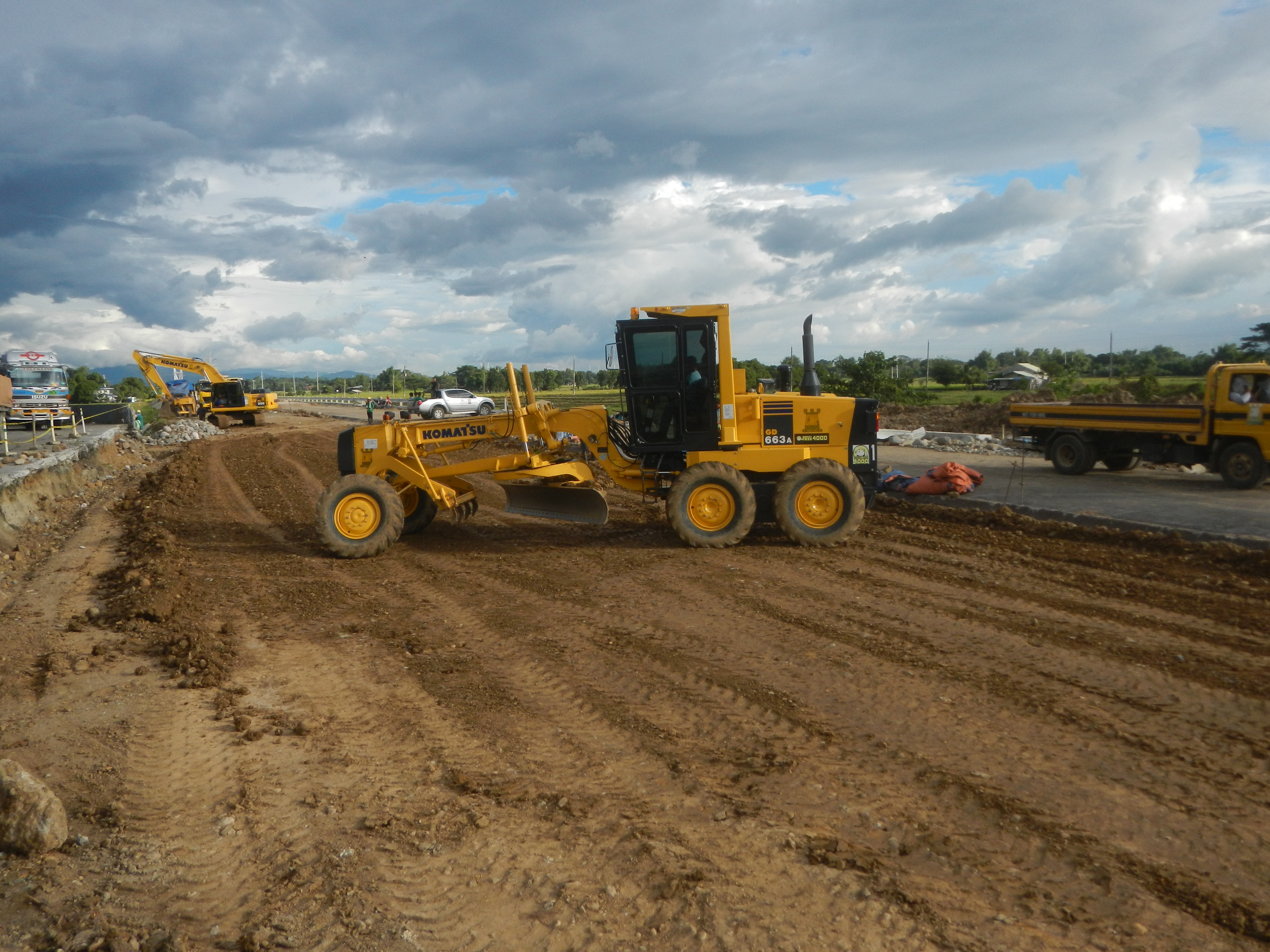
Plaridel Bypass Road under construction in San Rafael, 2017

The first phase of the road project, a 14-kilometer segment between NLEX and Plaridel, was opened in March 2012 and funded through Japan's official development assistance.

During the administration of President Benigno Aquino III, the road was initially planned to be a toll road named Plaridel Bypass Toll Road. However, it was revised to become an untolled road, which was later known as the Plaridel–San Rafael Bypass Road Project.

Construction of the road began in 2016, funded by a loan agreement with the Japan International Cooperation Agency. On April 30, 2018, Arterial Road Bypass Project Phase II was inaugurated. followed by the 10-kilometer (6.2 mi) Phase 2 section from Balagtas to Bustos on May 5.

In March 2021, Public Works and Highways Secretary Mark Villar inaugurated the widened Angat Bridge, Luzon’s longest river bridge across Angat River in Bustos, Bulacan.

President Bongbong Marcos with Antonio Lagdameo Jr., Japanese Ambassador Kazuhiko Kashikawa, and Manuel Bonoan inaugurated the Arterial Road Bypass Project Phase III (Contract Package 4) on October 9, 2023. The road, with a cost of ₱5.26 billion, has been widened from two lanes to four. It includes the 318-meter (1,043 ft) second San Rafael Flyover, while the 210-meter (690 ft) first Bustos Flyover was opened on July 12, 2022).

Construction of the 4-lane third ₱227 million 561-meter Guiguinto Flyover at Barangay Tiaong was finished in August 2024. The ceremonial topping out and Catholic blessing-inauguration by Bulacan LGU official were held on April 25 and August 14, respectively. The installation of the Arterial Road Bypass Project, Phase III historical marker dated August 30, 2024 was held also on August 14. Its 283.10 meters main Bridge has approaches of 138.66 and 139.38 meters with a concrete jersey barrier. In October 2024, DPWH Secretary Manuel Bonoan officially inaugurated and opened the Flyover No. 1, which is part of the newly widened 12.5-kilometer road section under contract packages (CP) 1 and 2 of the Arterial Road Bypass Project Phase 3.

== Gallery ==
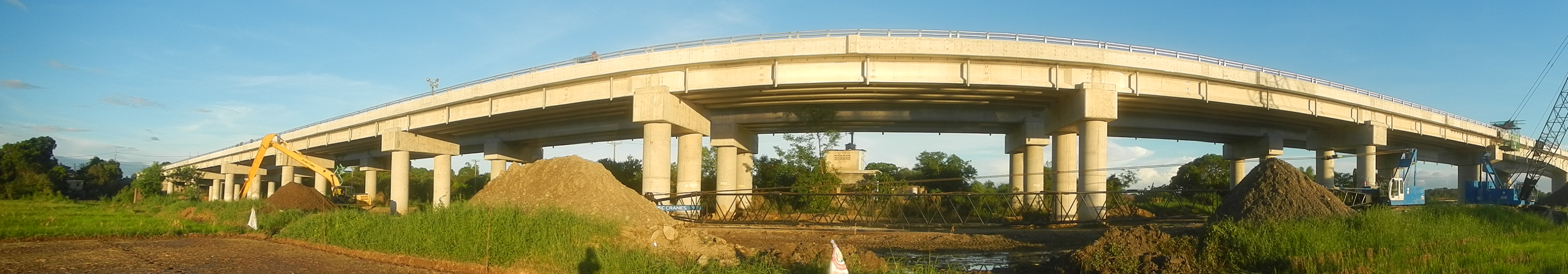
Angat Bridge

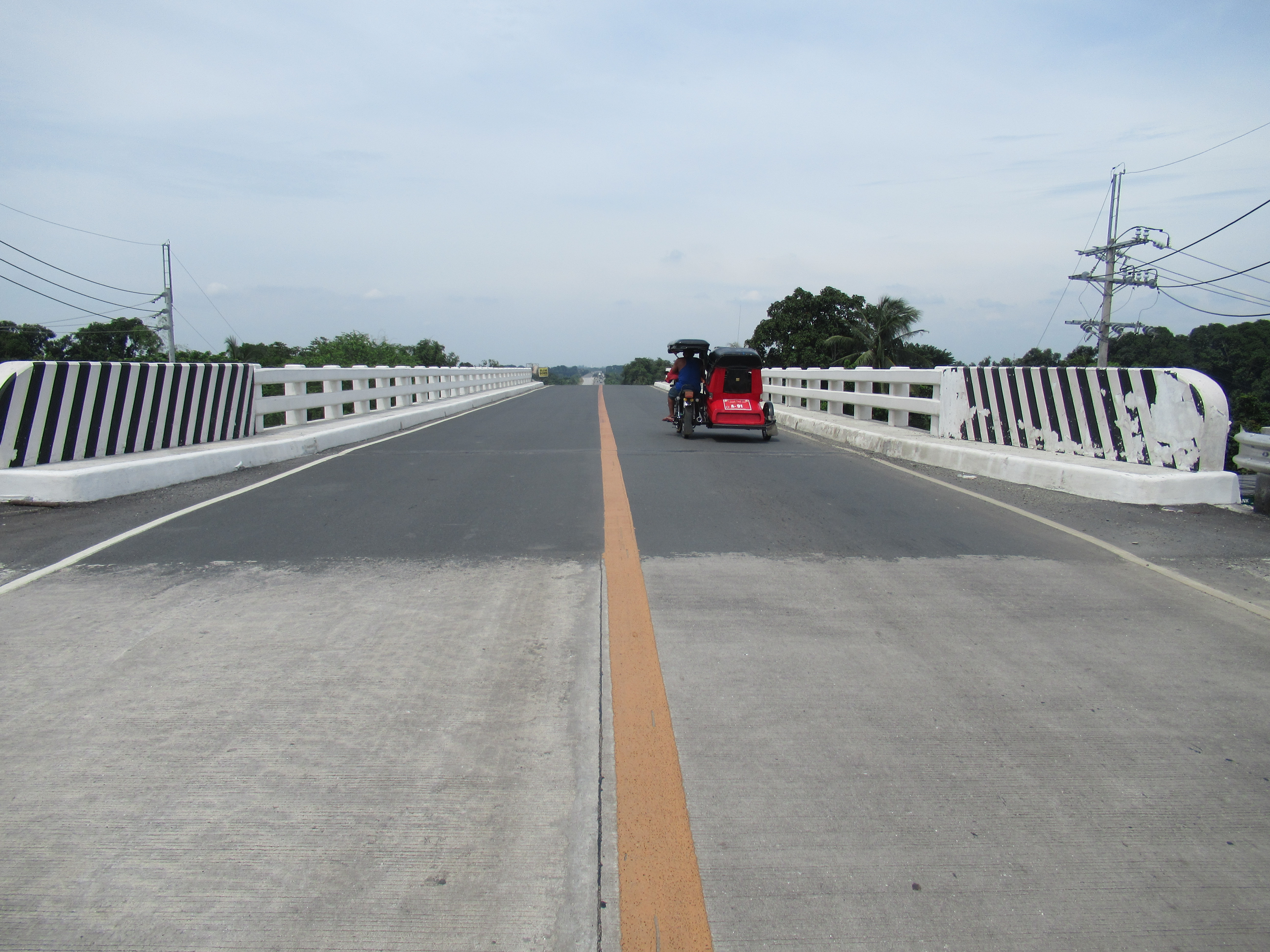
Bonga Menor overpass

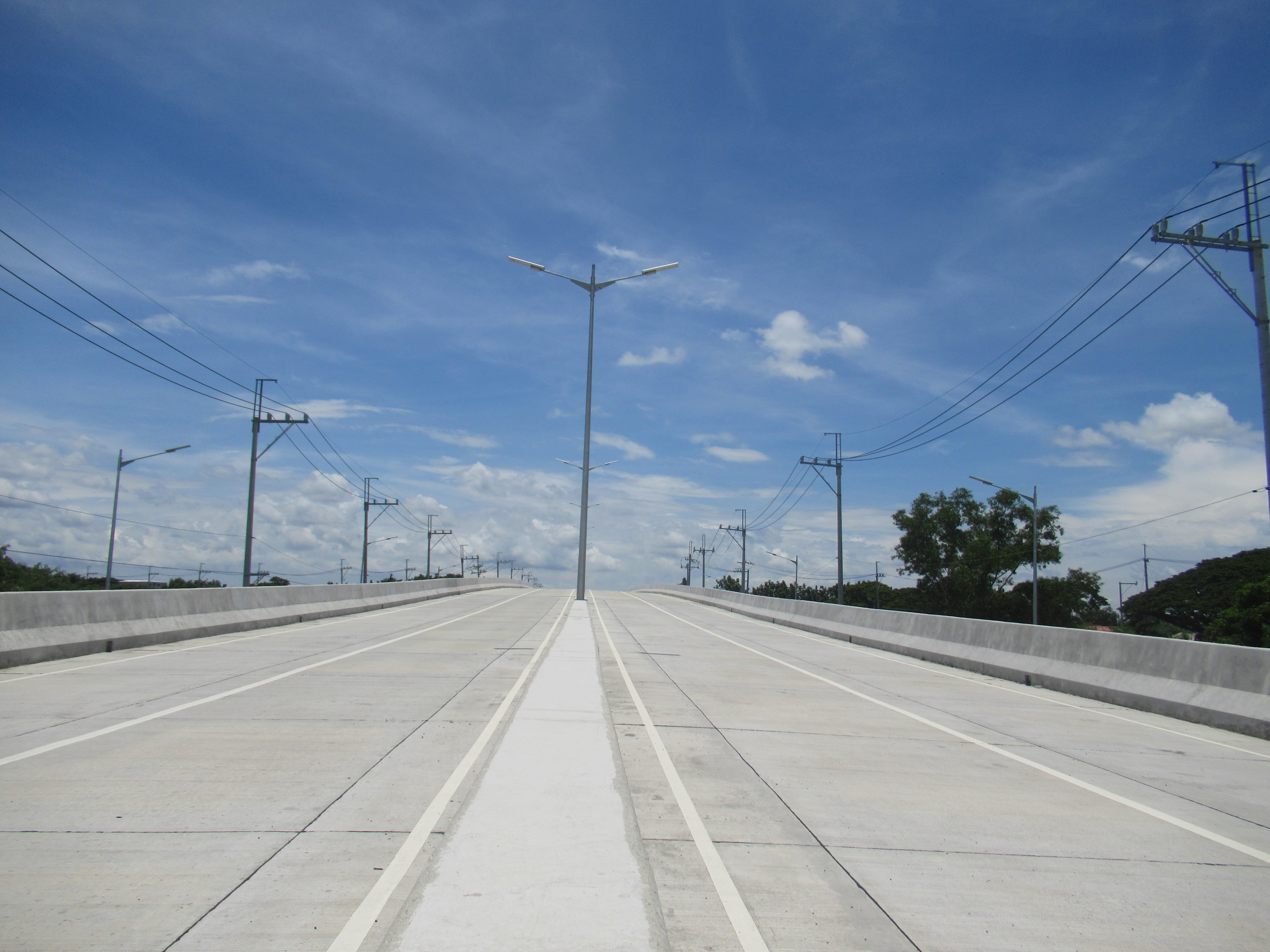
Caingin overpass

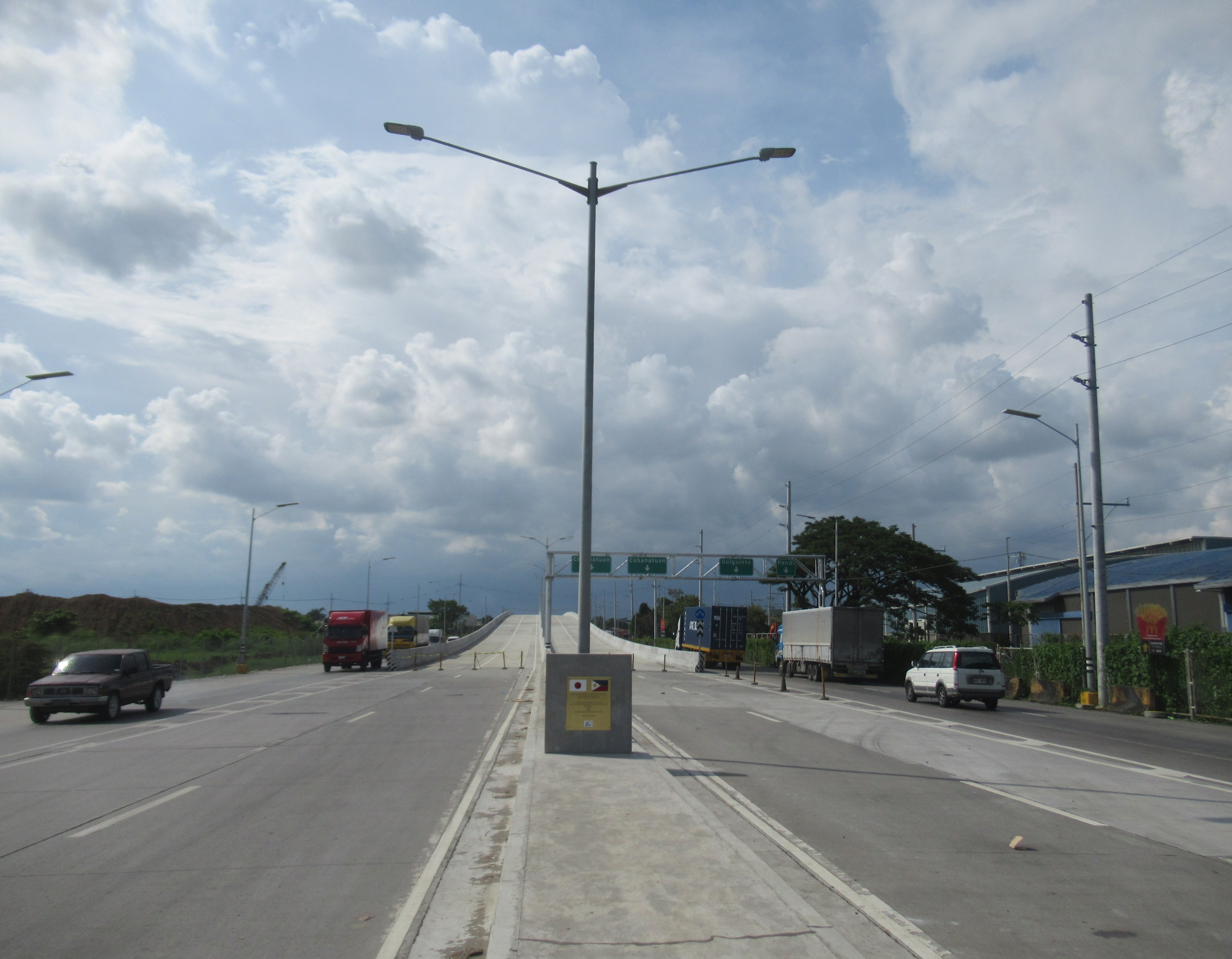
Tiaong overpass completed August, 2024

== Intersections ==
The entire route is located in Bulacan. Intersections are numbered by kilometer posts, with Rizal Park in Manila designated as kilometer zero.

City/Municipality	km	mi	Destinations	Notes
Guiguinto	34	21	E1 (NLEX Balagtas Exit) – Pampanga, Manila, Bocaue, Marilao	Southern terminus.
Guiguinto			Tiaong Barangay Road — Balagtas, Pandi	Accessible via Tiaong Flyover service road.
Guiguinto			Mercado Street	
Guiguinto			Cut-Cut–Daungan Road	
Guiguinto – Plaridel boundary			Guiguinto Diversion Road — Baliwag, Gapan, Cabanatuan, Malolos	Access to AH26 (Maharlika Highway) near E1 (NLEX Santa Rita Exit). Under construction.
Plaridel	38	24	Plaridel Bypass Access Road — Plaridel town proper	
Plaridel	39	24	Bulihan Provincial Road	
Plaridel – Bustos boundary	41	25	Pandi–Bustos Road — Pandi	Brgy. Camachilihan crossing.
Bustos			Pandi–Bustos Road	Brgy. Malamig crossing.
Bustos	47	29	Gen. Alejo G. Santos Highway — Norzagaray, Angat, Santa Maria, DRT	Also known as the Plaridel–Bustos–Angat–Norzagaray–Santa Maria Highway. Crossing accessible via Bustos Flyover service road.
San Rafael			Kalsadang Bago — San Rafael, Baliwag	Accessible via San Rafael Flyover service road.
San Rafael			Mayor Francisco Viola Sr. Highway — DRT, Angat, Baliwag	
San Rafael			San Roque Barangay Road	
San Rafael			Mabalas-balas Provincial Road	
San Rafael			San Rafael–San Ildefonso Bypass Road — San Ildefonso	Under construction.
San Rafael			AH26 (Maharlika Highway) – Cagayan Valley, Cabanatuan, Gapan	Northern terminus.
1.000 mi = 1.609 km; 1.000 km = 0.621 mi: Incomplete access; Unopened
