= E1 expressway (Philippines) =

Road in the Philippines

Expressway 1

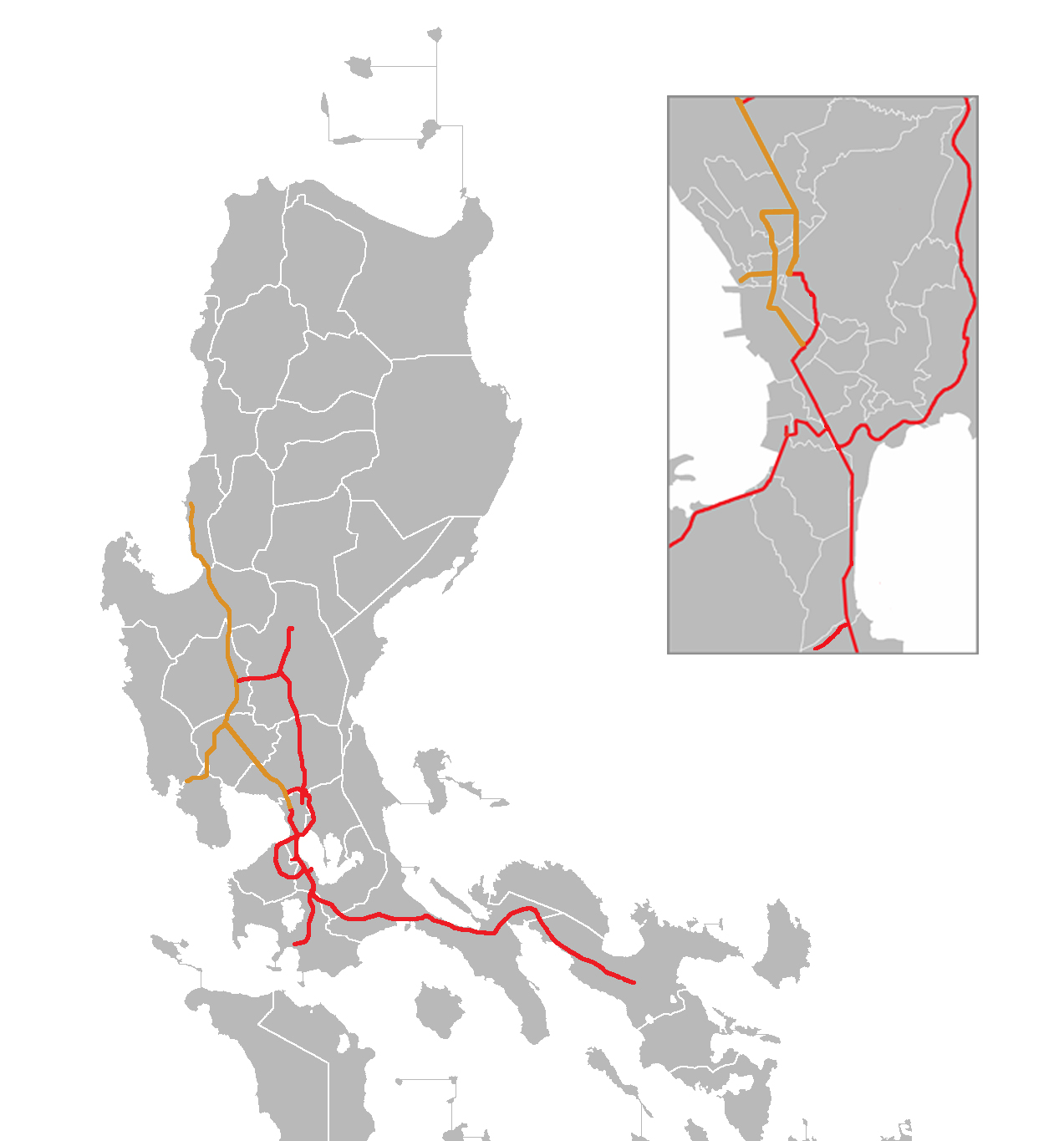

Route information
- Part of AH26
- Maintained by NLEX Corporation and SMC TPLEX Corporation
- Length: 226 km (140 mi)

Major junctions
- N213 (Magalang–Concepcion Road) in Concepcion, Tarlac; N2 (MacArthur Highway) in Mabalacat; N301 (Roman Superhighway) in Dinalupihan, Bataan; N3 (Jose Abad Santos Avenue) in San Fernando; AH26 (Maharlika Highway) in Guiguinto; N247 (Plaridel Bypass Road) in Balagtas; E5 (NLEX Harbor Link) in Valenzuela

Location
- Country: Philippines

Highway system
- Roads in the Philippines; Highways; Expressways; List

Expressway 1 (E1) forms part of the Philippine expressway network. It runs through western Luzon from Quezon City in the south to Rosario in the north.

== Quezon City to Mabalacat ==
The southern section of the E1 forms most of the North Luzon Expressway, a four- to eight-lane limited-access toll expressway that connects Metro Manila to the provinces of the Central Luzon region in the Philippines. It was built in the 1960s and is 84 kilometers (52 mi) long.

The expressway begins in Quezon City at the Balintawak Interchange with EDSA as a continuation of Andres Bonifacio Avenue. It then passes through Caloocan and Valenzuela in Metro Manila and the provinces of Bulacan and Pampanga in Central Luzon. In Bulacan, the expressway branches off as Tabang Spur Road, which terminates at Tabang Interchange, a partial cloverleaf interchange with MacArthur Highway and Cagayan Valley Road in Guiguinto. The main section of NLEX currently ends at Mabalacat and merges with the MacArthur Highway, which continues northward into the rest of Central and Northern Luzon.

Originally controlled by the Philippine National Construction Corporation (PNCC), operations and maintenance of the NLEX were transferred in 2005 to NLEX Corporation, a subsidiary of Metro Pacific Investments Corporation (a former subsidiary of the Lopez Group of Companies until 2008). A major upgrade and rehabilitation were completed in February 2005, and the road now resembles a modern French tollway.

It is also a part of the Asian Highway 26 (AH26) from Balintawak to Santa Rita exit, where N1 (Maharlika Highway) continues the AH26 designation.

== Mabalacat to Tarlac City ==
The central section of the E1 forms part of the Subic–Clark–Tarlac Expressway, a 93.77-kilometer (58.27 mi) four-lane expressway built by the Bases Conversion and Development Authority (BCDA), a government-owned and controlled corporation under the Office of the President of the Philippines. The Subic–Clark–Tarlac Expressway (SCTEX) is the country's longest expressway at 93.77 kilometers (58.27 mi). Construction of the expressway started on April 5, 2005, while commercial operations started on April 28, 2008, with the opening of the Subic-Clark Segment and Zone A of the portion of the Clark-Tarlac Segment. The opening of Zones B and C of the remaining Clark-Tarlac Segment on July 25, 2008, signaled the full operation of the SCTEX.

== Tarlac City to Rosario ==
The northern section of the E1 forms the Tarlac–Pangasinan–La Union Expressway, an 89.21 kilometers (55.43 mi) four-lane expressway north of Manila, in the Philippines. It connects central to northern Luzon, with its southernmost terminal in Tarlac City, Tarlac and its planned northernmost terminus currently slated to be at Rosario, La Union.

The first section, from Tarlac City to Pura, Tarlac, operated on a "soft opening" basis from October 31, 2013, until full operations began in November 2013.

Part of the second segment, which will take motorists up to Ramos, Tarlac, opened on December 23, 2013. The remaining section from Anao, Tarlac to Rosales, Pangasinan, opened on April 16, 2014, and the final section ending in Rosario, La Union was completed in July 2020.

Proposals have also been raised to extend the project to Laoag in Ilocos Norte.

== Exits ==
=== Main Line ===
==== North Luzon Expressway ====
Region	Province	City/Municipality	km	mi	Exit	Name	Destinations	Notes
Metro Manila	Quezon City		9.56	5.94		Balintawak Cloverleaf	AH26 (EDSA) – Cubao, Monumento	Southern end of AH26 concurrency and southern terminus; continues south to Manila as N160 (A. Bonifacio Avenue)
Metro Manila	Quezon City		10.01– 10.1	6.22– 6.3			N127 (Quirino Highway) – Novaliches	Half-Y interchange; northbound exit and southbound entrance; consists of the Old and New Novaliches Flyovers
Metro Manila	Caloocan–Malabon boundary		11	6.8	North end of N160 concurrency			
Metro Manila	Caloocan–Malabon boundary		11	6.8	Manila North Expressway: Balintawak toll plaza (1968–2005, demolished)			
Metro Manila	Caloocan		11	6.8			E2 (Metro Manila Skyway) – Makati, Alabang	Balintawak/NLEX Exit of Skyway; northbound entrance and southbound exit
Metro Manila	Caloocan		11	6.8		Libis Baesa	Libis Baesa, Potrero	Southbound exit only
Metro Manila	Caloocan		12	7.5	Balintawak Toll Plaza (northbound only)			
Metro Manila	Caloocan		12	7.5	Balintawak Toll Plaza expansion (northbound only; exclusively for Class 1 vehicles)			
Metro Manila	Valenzuela		13.557	8.424	13	Harbor Link Interchange	E5 (NLEX Harbor Link) – Mindanao Avenue, Port of Manila, Santa Mesa	Cloverleaf interchange
Metro Manila	Valenzuela		14	8.7		Mapulang Lupa	Mapulang Lupa, Paso de Blas, Parada	Northbound exit only; demolished
Metro Manila	Valenzuela		15.392	9.564	15	Paso de Blas (Valenzuela City)	N118 (Paso de Blas Road) – Paso de Blas, Novaliches, Fairview, VGC	Diamond interchange
Metro Manila	Valenzuela		17	11	NLEX Drive&Dine (southbound)			
Metro Manila	Valenzuela		17	11	17	Lawang Bato	Lawang Bato, Punturin	Northbound entrance and exit only; entrance exclusively for Class 1 and 2 RFID users only
Metro Manila	Valenzuela		17	11	17	Lingunan	Lingunan, Canumay, Lawang Bato	Southbound exit and southbound entrance only
Central Luzon	Bulacan	Meycauayan	19	12	19	Libtong	Libtong	Northbound exit only
Central Luzon	Bulacan	Meycauayan	20.128	12.507	20	Meycauayan	N117 (Malhacan Road) / Iba Road – Meycauayan, Obando	Folded diamond interchange
Central Luzon	Bulacan	Meycauayan	21	13	21	Pandayan	Pandayan	Southbound exit only (class 1 only)
Central Luzon	Bulacan	Meycauayan	22	14	22	F. Raymundo	F. Raymundo	Northbound exit only (class 1 only)
Central Luzon	Bulacan	Marilao	22	14	Petron KM 23 service area (northbound only)			
Central Luzon	Bulacan	Marilao	23	14	23	Marilao	Marilao	Northbound exit only; replaced by a new exit with the same name a few meters north
Central Luzon	Bulacan	Marilao	23.317	14.489	23	Marilao	M. Villarica Road / Patubig Road – Marilao, San Jose del Monte, Norzagaray	Folded diamond interchange
Central Luzon	Bulacan	Marilao	24	15		MALEX		Trumpet interchange; link to the proposed New Manila International Airport
Central Luzon	Bulacan	Bocaue	26	16	26	Ciudad de Victoria		Northbound exit only; replaced by a proper northbound-southbound exit
Central Luzon	Bulacan	Bocaue	26	16		Philippine Arena	Ciudad de Victoria, Philippine Arena, Santa Maria	Half diamond and partial cloverleaf interchange
Central Luzon	Bulacan	Bocaue				Bocaue Bypass		Southbound entry only; under construction
Central Luzon	Bulacan	Bocaue	27	17	Bocaue Toll Plaza (southbound only); North end of barrier toll system. South end of closed road toll system.			
Central Luzon	Bulacan	Bocaue	27	17	Bocaue Toll Plaza expansion (southbound only); North end of barrier toll system. South end of closed road toll system.			
Central Luzon	Bulacan	Bocaue	27.746	17.241	27	Bocaue	Fortunato Halili Avenue – Bocaue, Santa Maria	Diamond interchange
Central Luzon	Bulacan	Bocaue	28.65	17.80	28	Tambubong	Taal, Tambubong (Bocaue), Santa Maria	Northbound entrance, northbound exit, and southbound entrance only
Central Luzon	Bulacan	Bocaue	30.3	18.8	Petron KM 31 service area (southbound only)			
Central Luzon	Bulacan	Balagtas	32	20	Shell (NLEX Northbound) service area			
Central Luzon	Bulacan	Balagtas	31.9– 32.1	19.8– 19.9		Burol	Burol, Guiguinto	Northbound exit only; sections of the former exit are now used as residential road and exit point from Shell service area.
Central Luzon	Bulacan	Balagtas	32.885	20.434	32	Tabang (Guiguinto)	E1 (Tabang Spur Road) – Tabang, Guiguinto, Malolos	Half-Y interchange; northbound exit and southbound entrance; former northern terminus (1968–1977)
Central Luzon	Bulacan	Balagtas	33.36	20.73	34	Balagtas	N247 (Plaridel Bypass Road) – Balagtas, Bustos, Pandi, Angat, Doña Remedios Trinidad, San Rafael	Partial trumpet interchange; northbound exit, northbound entrance and southbound entrance
Central Luzon	Bulacan	Guiguinto	36	22		NLEX-NLEE Interchange		Links to the proposed provincial spur road of North Luzon East Expressway; interchange type not yet known
Central Luzon	Bulacan	Guiguinto	37	23	Shell of Asia service area (southbound only)			
Central Luzon	Bulacan	Guiguinto	38.51	23.93	38	Santa Rita (Guiguinto)	AH26 (Maharlika Highway / Cagayan Valley Road) – Guiguinto, Plaridel, Baliwag, Cabanatuan, Bustos, Pulilan	Folded diamond interchange; north end of AH26 concurrency
Central Luzon	Bulacan	Malolos			No major junctions			
Central Luzon	Bulacan	Plaridel	42	26	Petron KM 42 service area (northbound only)			
Central Luzon	Bulacan	Plaridel – Pulilan boundary			Angat Bridge over the Angat River			
Central Luzon	Bulacan	Pulilan	45	28	45	Pulilan	N115 (Pulilan Regional Road) – Pulilan, Baliwag, Malolos, Calumpit, Apalit, San Simon	Diamond interchange
Central Luzon	Bulacan	Pulilan	46	29	South end of Candaba Viaduct			
Central Luzon	Bulacan	Calumpit			No major junctions			
Central Luzon	Pampanga	Apalit	52	32	North end of Candaba Viaduct			
Central Luzon	Pampanga	Apalit	55	34	Total (NLEX) service area (northbound only)			
Central Luzon	Pampanga	San Simon	56.965	35.396	56	San Simon	Quezon Road – San Simon, Apalit, Minalin, Santo Tomas	Diamond interchange
Central Luzon	Pampanga	Santo Tomas	60	37		Santo Tomas	Lubao–Guagua–Minalin–Santo Tomas Bypass Road	
Central Luzon	Pampanga	San Fernando	62	39	Mega Station (southbound only)			
Central Luzon	Pampanga	San Fernando	65.825	40.902	65	San Fernando	N3 (Jose Abad Santos Avenue) – San Fernando, Bacolor, Guagua, Mexico, Subic Freeport Zone, Bataan	Half partial cloverleaf (east half), and half diamond interchange (west half)
Central Luzon	Pampanga	Mexico	71	44	Petron KM 71 Lakeshore (northbound only)			
Central Luzon	Pampanga	Mexico	72.89	45.29	72	Mexico (closed)	Mexico, Lakeshore Estate	Half partial cloverleaf interchange (demolished); replaced by the current exit few meters north
Central Luzon	Pampanga	Mexico	72	45	72	Mexico	Mexico-Calulut Road – Mexico, Dalisdis (Mexico), Panipuan (San Fernando)	Trumpet interchange
Central Luzon	Pampanga	Mexico	76	47	Shell service station (southbound only)			
Central Luzon	Pampanga	Mexico	77	48	Shell Mexico Mobility Haven service station (northbound only)			
Central Luzon	Pampanga	Angeles			Abacan Bridge over the Abacan River			
Central Luzon	Pampanga	Angeles	81.0	50.3	81	Angeles	Angeles–Magalang Road – Angeles, Magalang	Partial cloverleaf interchange (1984–2005); replaced by the current exit few meters north
Central Luzon	Pampanga	Angeles	81.342	50.544	81	Angeles	Angeles–Magalang Road/Pandan Road/Aniceto Gueco Street – Angeles, Magalang, Clark	Trumpet interchange
Central Luzon	Pampanga	Mabalacat	82	51	Dau Toll Plaza (2005–2016)			
Central Luzon	Pampanga	Mabalacat	83.352	51.793	83	Dau	N215 (Dau Access Road) – Dau, Mabalacat	Trumpet interchange; former northern terminus (1977–1989)
Central Luzon	Pampanga	Mabalacat	85.56	53.16	85	SCTEX	E1 (Clark Spur Road) – Clark Airport, Tarlac City, Baguio, Subic	Half trumpet interchange; north end of R-8 concurrency; northbound exit and southbound entrance
Central Luzon	Pampanga	Mabalacat	87	54	Sta. Ines Toll Plaza (1989–2005, 2016–present)			
Central Luzon	Pampanga	Mabalacat	88.70	55.12	88	Santa Ines	N213 (Mabalacat–Magalang Road) / (Mabalacat Bypass Road) – Clark Airport, Concepcion, Mabalacat	Northern terminus; trumpet interchange; continues north as Mabalacat Bypass Road
1.000 mi = 1.609 km; 1.000 km = 0.621 mi: Closed/former; Concurrency terminus; Incomplete access; Tolled; Unopened

==== SCTEX (Clark to Tarlac segment) and TPLEX ====
Region	Province	City/Municipality	km	mi	Exit	Name	Destinations	Notes
Central Luzon	Pampanga	Mabalacat	85	53		NLEX	E1 (NLEX) – Manila	Half-trumpet interchange; eastbound exit and westbound entrance; eastern terminus of Clark Spur Road
Central Luzon	Pampanga	Mabalacat	85	53			SCTEX	At-grade U-turn slot; access for eastbound motorists only
Central Luzon	Pampanga	Mabalacat	87	54		Mabiga (Mabalacat)	N2 (MacArthur Highway) – Mabalacat	Diamond interchange
Central Luzon	Pampanga	Mabalacat	87	54	Mabalacat toll plaza (2008–2016, demolished)			
Central Luzon	Pampanga	Mabalacat	88	55	88	Clark Logistics	E1 / E4 (SCTEX Main) – Subic, Tarlac City, Baguio	Trumpet interchange; route changes from E1 (Clark Spur Road) to E1/E4 (SCTEX Main Trunk)
Central Luzon	Pampanga	Mabalacat	91.9– 92.1	57.1– 57.2	92	Clark North	Prince Balagtas Avenue – Clark Airport, Clark Freeport	Directional T interchange
Central Luzon	Pampanga	Mabalacat	93	58	93	Dolores	N2 (MacArthur Highway) – Dolores, Bamban	Half partial cloverleaf interchange; northbound exit and entrance only; former northern terminus
Central Luzon	Tarlac	Bamban			Sacobia–Bamban Main Bridge over the Sacobia River			
Central Luzon	Tarlac	Bamban	100	62	100	New Clark City	New Clark City Access Road – Bamban, New Clark City, Capas	Trumpet interchange; limited access
Central Luzon	Tarlac	Bamban	101	63	PTT service area (Northbound)			
Central Luzon	Tarlac	Concepcion	102	63	Seaoil service area (Southbound)			
Central Luzon	Tarlac	Concepcion	103.8	64.5	104	Concepcion	N213 (Magalang–Concepcion Road) – Concepcion, Capas	Trumpet interchange
Central Luzon	Tarlac	Tarlac City	117.742	73.161	118	Hacienda Luisita	Luisita Access Road – Hacienda Luisita, Santa Ignacia, Camiling	Half-trumpet / partial cloverleaf interchange; northbound exit and southbound entrance
Central Luzon	Tarlac	Tarlac City			Luisita toll plaza (2013–2014; demolished)			
Central Luzon	Tarlac	Tarlac City			Tarlac toll plaza (2016–present)			
Central Luzon	Tarlac	Tarlac City	122	76	122	CLLEX / Tarlac City	N58 (Santa Rosa–Tarlac Road) / N308 (CLLEX) – Tarlac City, La Paz, Santa Rosa, Cabanatuan	Hybrid trumpet and diamond interchange; boundary and simultaneous transition from SCTEX to TPLEX after Cut Cut Bridge
Central Luzon	Tarlac	Tarlac City	124	77	124	Tarlac City (La Paz)	N58 (Santa Rosa—Tarlac Road) – Tarlac City, La Paz, Santa Rosa, Cabanatuan	Right-in/right-out exit and entrance at southbound
Central Luzon	Tarlac	Tarlac City	126	78	Tarlac Central toll plaza			
Central Luzon	Tarlac	Tarlac City				NALEX		Connects with the future Northern Access Link Expressway towards New Manila International Airport; southbound exit and northbound entrance
Central Luzon	Tarlac	Victoria	131.062	81.438	131	Victoria (Talavera)	Tarlac—Victoria Road — Victoria, Talavera	Trumpet interchange
Central Luzon	Tarlac	Victoria	134	83	Petron KM 134 (northbound)			
Central Luzon	Tarlac	Victoria	134	83	Petron KM 134 (southbound)			
Central Luzon	Tarlac	Pura	139.079	86.420	139	Pura (Gerona)	Gerona—Guimba Road — Pura, Gerona, Guimba, Muñoz, Talugtug, San Jose, Cagayan Valley	Trumpet interchange
Central Luzon	Tarlac	Ramos	145.01	90.11	145	Ramos (Paniqui)	Paniqui—Ramos Road — Paniqui, Ramos	Trumpet interchange
Central Luzon	Tarlac	Anao	150.722	93.654	150	Anao (Moncada)	Moncada—Anao Road — Anao, Moncada, Nampicuan, Cuyapo	Trumpet interchange; former northern terminus (2013–2014)
Ilocos Region	Pangasinan	Rosales	169.388	105.253	169	Rosales (Villasis)	Rosales Access Road – Rosales, San Manuel, Villasis, Santo Tomas, San Carlos	Trumpet interchange; access to N2 (Manila North Road) and also Cagayan Valley via N114 (Pangasinan–Nueva Vizcaya Road)
Ilocos Region	Pangasinan	Rosales	169.388	105.253	Carmen Toll Plaza (2014, demolished)			
Ilocos Region	Pangasinan	Rosales	171.5	106.6		Carmen	N56 (Carmen–Poblacion Rosales Road)	Half diamond interchange (2014–2016)
Ilocos Region	Pangasinan	Rosales – Villasis boundary	171.7– 172.7	106.7– 107.3	Agno Viaduct over the Agno River			
Ilocos Region	Pangasinan	Urdaneta	184.29	114.51	184	Urdaneta (Dagupan)	N2 (Manila North Road) – Urdaneta, Dagupan	Trumpet interchange; former northern terminus (2014–2017)
Ilocos Region	Pangasinan	Laoac	189	117	189	Binalonan (Manaoag Church)	N210 (Binalonan–Dagupan Highway) – Binalonan, Laoac, Manaoag	Trumpet interchange; access to Manaoag Church
Ilocos Region	Pangasinan	Pozorrubio	199	124	199	Pozorrubio (San Jacinto)	N2 (Manila North Road) – Pozorrubio, San Jacinto	Trumpet interchange; former northern terminus (2017–2020)
Ilocos Region	Pangasinan	Sison	205	127	205	Sison	N2 (Manila North Road) – Sison	Trumpet interchange
Ilocos Region	Pangasinan	Sison	207.26– 208	128.79– 129	Bued Viaduct over the Bued River			
Ilocos Region	La Union	Rosario	210	130	Rosario toll plaza			
Ilocos Region	La Union	Rosario	211	131		Rosario	N2 (Manila North Road) – San Fernando, San Juan, Vigan, Laoag, Pagudpud; N54 (Kennon Road) – Baguio	Roundabout interchange; northern end of R-8 concurrency. Current northern terminus.
Ilocos Region	La Union	Tubao				Tubao	N208 (Aspiras–Palispis Highway) – Tubao, Agoo, Pugo, Baguio	Trumpet interchange
Ilocos Region	La Union	Bauang				Naguilian	N54 (Naguilian Road) – Naguilian, Burgos, Baguio	Trumpet interchange
Ilocos Region	La Union	San Fernando				San Fernando City	San Fernando, Bauang	Trumpet interchange
Ilocos Region	La Union	San Juan				San Juan	N2 (Manila North Road) – San Juan	Trumpet interchange; future northern terminus
1.000 mi = 1.609 km; 1.000 km = 0.621 mi: Closed/former; Concurrency terminus; Incomplete access; Tolled; Route transition; Unopened

=== Tabang Spur Road ===
The entire route is located in Bulacan.

City/Municipality	km	mi	Exit	Name	Destinations	Notes
Guiguinto	36	22	36	Guiguinto	N1 (MacArthur Highway / Cagayan Valley Road) – Guiguinto, Malolos, Balagtas	Folded diamond interchange; western terminus; continues west as N2 (MacArthur Highway)
Guiguinto	36	22			St. Francis Street	T-intersection
Guiguinto	36	22	Shell service station (eastbound only)			
Guiguinto	36	22	Tabang Toll Plaza			
Guiguinto	34	21		Tabe	Tabe	Access for westbound motorists only
Balagtas	32	20	32		AH26 (NLEX Main) – Manila	Half-Y interchange; Eastbound exit and westbound entrance; eastern terminus
1.000 mi = 1.609 km; 1.000 km = 0.621 mi: Closed/former; Incomplete access; Tolled
