= Subic–Clark–Tarlac Expressway =

Expressway in the Philippines

R-8 Subic–Clark–Tarlac Expressway

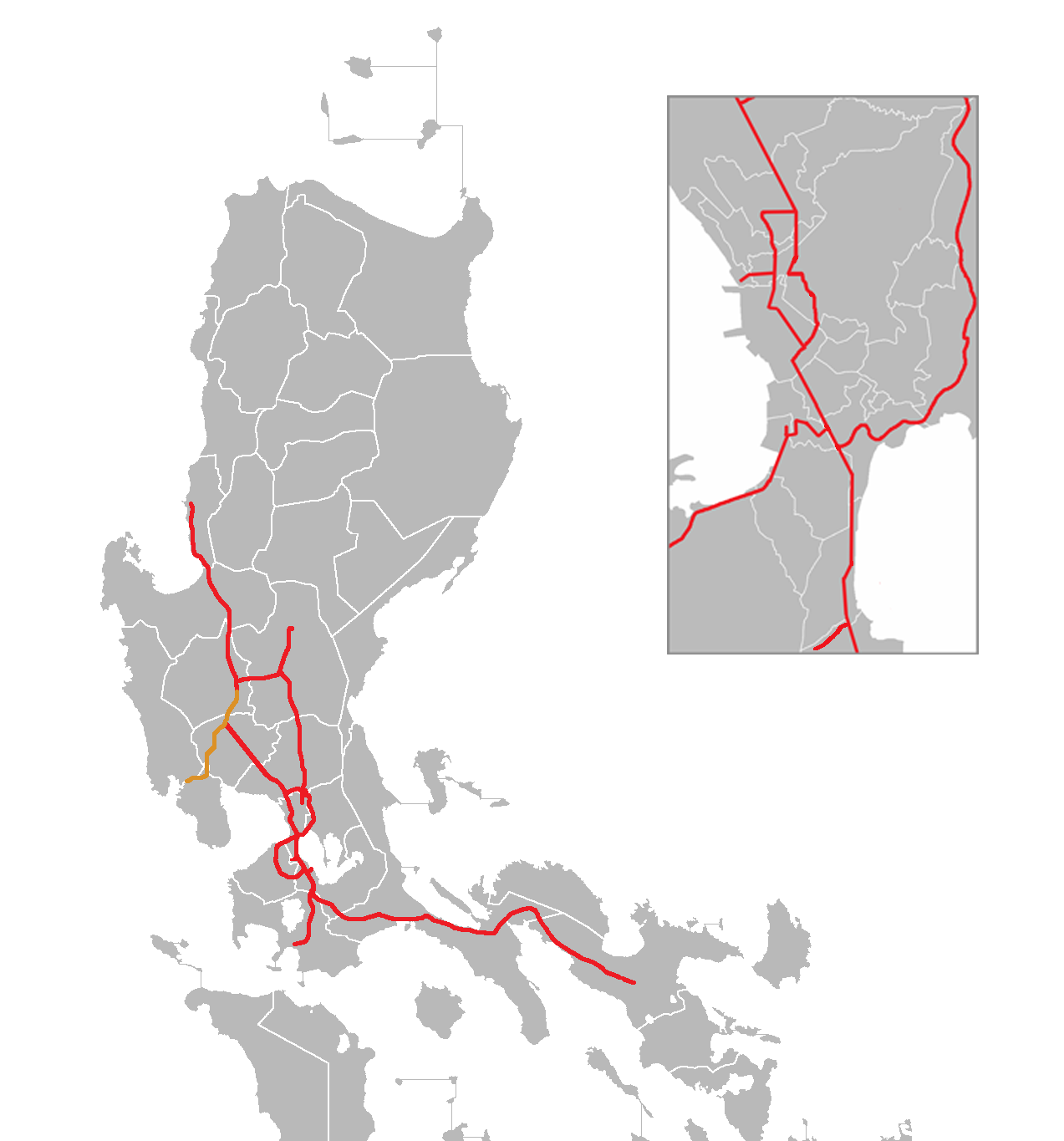
- Map of expressways in Luzon, with the Subic–Clark–Tarlac Expressway in orange

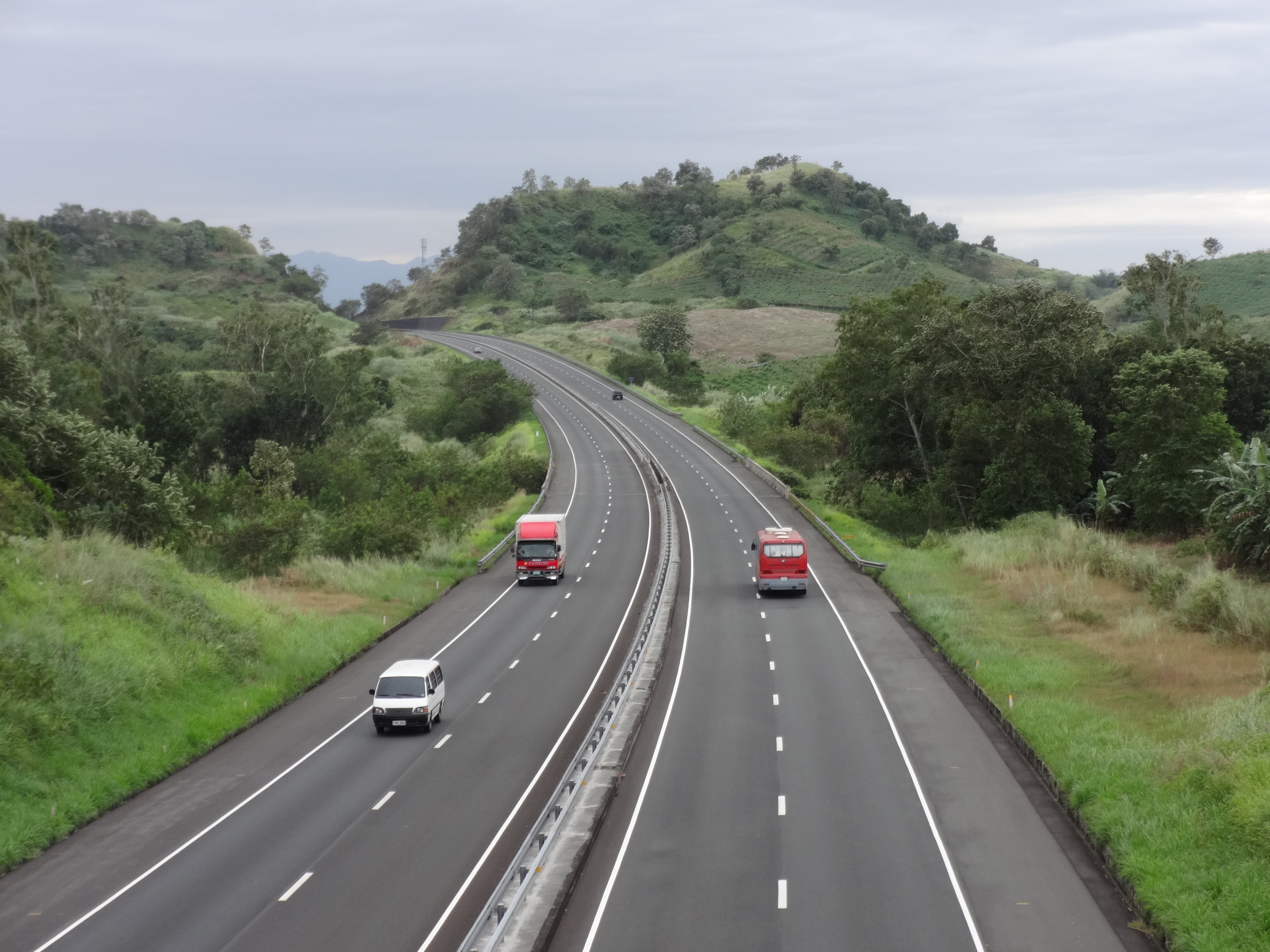
- A portion of SCTEX in Floridablanca, Pampanga

Route information
- Maintained by NLEX Corporation
- Length: 93.77 km (58.27 mi) including Clark Spur Road
- Existed: 2008–present
- Component highways: E4 from Dinalupihan to Mabalacat; E1 from Mabalacat to Tarlac City; R-8 R-8 (concurrent with E1 only)
- Restrictions: No motorcycles below 400cc

Major junctions
- North end: E1 (Tarlac–Pangasinan–La Union Expressway) in Tarlac City
- N213 (Magalang–Concepcion Road) in Concepcion, Tarlac; N2 (MacArthur Highway) in Mabalacat; E1 (North Luzon Expressway) in Mabalacat; N301 (Roman Superhighway) in Dinalupihan
- South end: E4 (Subic Freeport Expressway) in Dinalupihan

Location
- Country: Philippines
- Regions: Central Luzon
- Provinces: Bataan; Pampanga; Tarlac; Zambales
- Major cities: Angeles; Mabalacat; Olongapo; Tarlac City
- Towns: Bamban; Capas; Concepcion; Dinalupihan; Floridablanca; Hermosa; Porac

Highway system
- Roads in the Philippines; Highways; Expressways; List

The Subic–Clark–Tarlac Expressway (SCTEX) is a 93.77-kilometer-long (58.27 mi) controlled-access highway in the Central Luzon region of the Philippines and the longest expressway in the country. The expressway runs from Tipo in Dinalupihan, Bataan, to Tarlac City, connecting Subic and Clark and providing access to New Clark City. It connects with the Subic Freeport Expressway (SFEX), the North Luzon Expressway (NLEX), the Central Luzon Link Expressway (CLLEX), and the Tarlac–Pangasinan–La Union Expressway (TPLEX). It is a component of Expressway 1 (E1) (Note: Between Mabalacat and Tarlac City) and Expressway 4 (E4) (Note: Between Dinalupihan and Mabalacat) of the Philippine expressway network and Radial Road 8 (R-8) (Note: Mabalacat–Tarlac City segment only) of the Metro Manila's arterial road network.

The expressway was constructed by the Bases Conversion and Development Authority (BCDA), a government-owned and controlled corporation (GOCC), to provide a transport corridor between Subic (Zambales and Bataan), Clark (Pampanga), and Tarlac and to connect major infrastructure in the region, including the Port of Subic Bay, Subic Bay International Airport, and Clark International Airport. Construction began in 2005. Commercial operations began on April 28, 2008, with the opening of the Subic–Clark segment and Zone A of the Clark–Tarlac segment. Zones B and C of the Clark–Tarlac segment opened on July 25, 2008, marking the full opening of the SCTEX.

== Route description ==
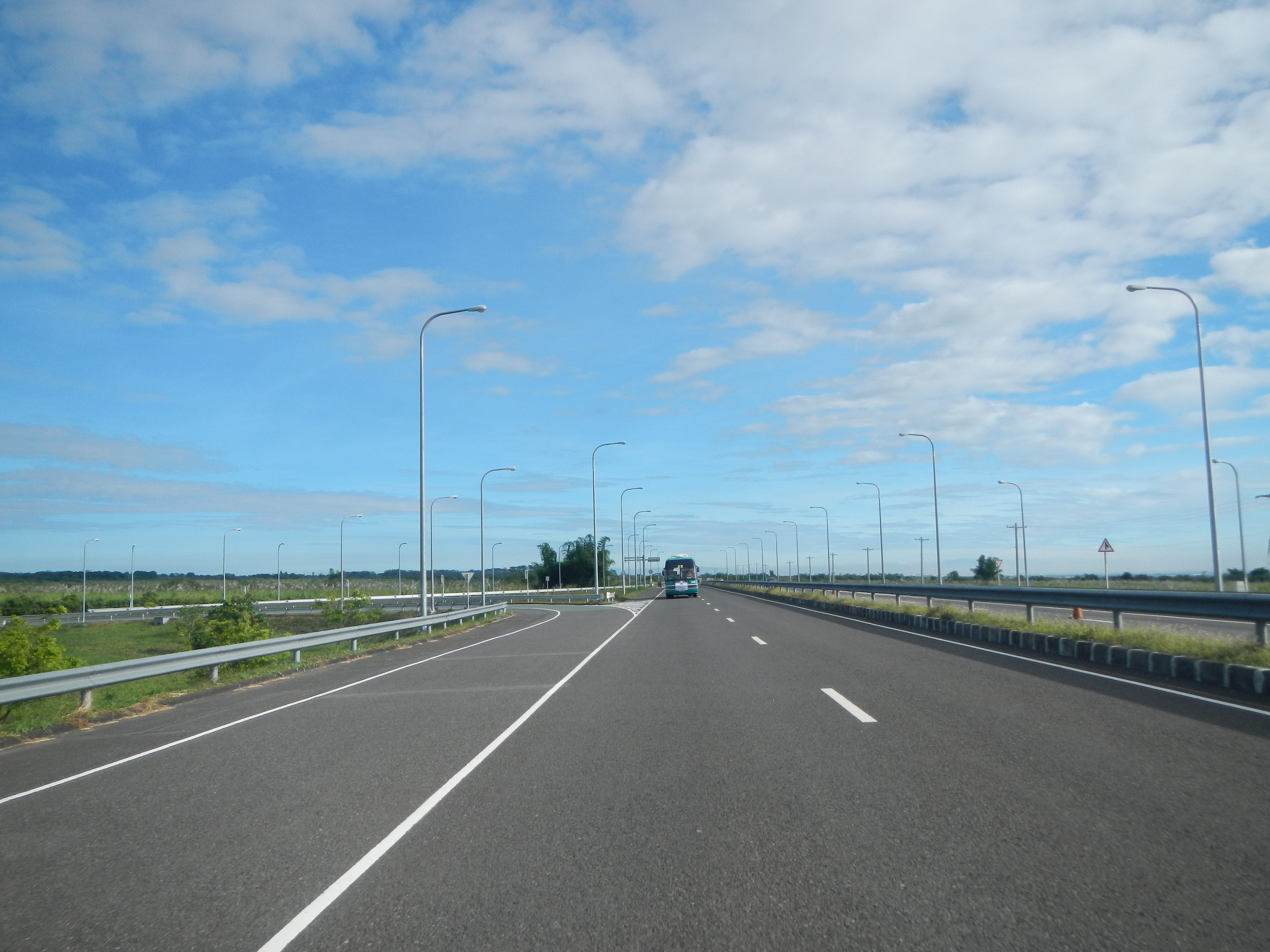
The expressway near Porac, Pampanga

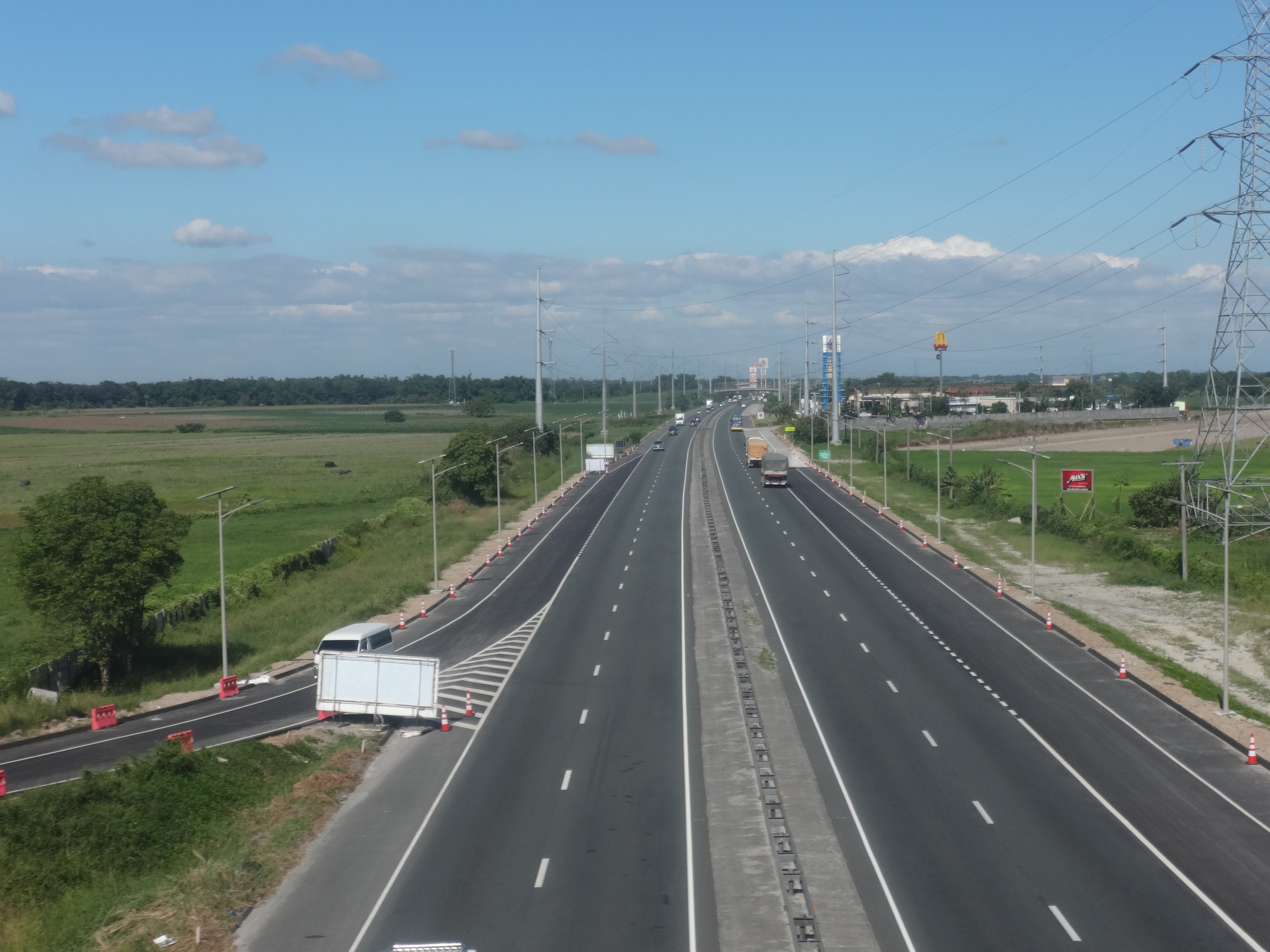
A portion of SCTEX in Concepcion, Tarlac

The Subic–Clark–Tarlac Expressway (SCTEX) runs northwest from Bataan and runs through the provinces of Pampanga and Tarlac. The entirety of the SCTEX is built as a four-lane expressway mostly laid out on embankment, with some sections using cuts to traverse hilly areas. The expressway also crosses the four rivers in Central Luzon: the Dinalupihan River in Bataan, the Gumain River in Floridablanca and the Pasig–Potrero River in Porac, both in Pampanga, and the Sacobia River in Bamban, Tarlac. All exits require toll payment, and toll plazas are laid on the termini of the expressway.

SCTEX starts at Tipo Interchange, its intersection with the Subic Freeport Expressway (SFEX) in Dinalupihan, near Barangay Tipo in Hermosa, Bataan. The expressway initially traverses the Roosevelt Protected Landscape and is built parallel to the Jose Abad Santos Avenue (N3) until Dinalupihan Exit, where the expressway curves northward and tracks the Angeles-Porac-Floridablanca-Dinalupihan Road as it follows a mostly straight route. The expressway then curves to the northeast before Floridablanca Exit. It curves toward the northwest and back to the northeast before Porac Exit. It then curves eastward and then northward near Clark Freeport and Clark International Airport. Clark South Exit, which serves those areas, lies near Mabalacat Interchange, with the exits being one kilometer (0.62 mi) apart from each other. The segment ends at the Clark Logistics interchange in Mabalacat, where it meets the Clark Spur Road (also known as NLEX–SCTEX Link) that links SCTEX with North Luzon Expressway (NLEX) and crosses over MacArthur Highway (N2).

Past the Clark Logistics interchange, its main destination changes to Tarlac City and Baguio. The roadway runs at the boundary of Clark Freeport and Mabalacat city proper, where the Philippine National Railways (PNR) North Main Line to Dagupan and San Fernando, La Union also lies. MacArthur Highway parallels the expressway up to Tarlac City.

Leaving Clark Freeport, Clark North Exit comes before the expressway, where it curves and then crosses MacArthur Highway at Barangay Dolores, where a half-partial cloverleaf interchange, serving only northbound traffic, connects the two. Approaching Tarlac, the expressway bridges over the Sacobia River. The first service areas on the expressway, one serving northbound and one for southbound traffic and separated by one kilometer, come before Concepcion Exit. The expressway passes near the poblacion of Concepcion, then over agricultural land of Tarlac City. Hacienda Luisita Exit comes before the northern end of the expressway, and serves Hacienda Luisita as well as connecting MacArthur Highway and serving barangays along its connecting road. A new toll plaza built on the main route serves the final Tarlac City Exit. The exit serves an interchange with the Central Luzon Link Expressway (CLLEX). Past Tarlac City Exit, SCTEX becomes Tarlac–Pangasinan–La Union Expressway (TPLEX) northward.

== History ==
The project was initiated under the administration of President Joseph Estrada with an original project cost of ₱15.73 billion. On September 14, 2001, the loan agreement was signed between the Philippines and Japan to finance and construct the expressway with a total cost of ₱17.84 billion (¥41.93 billion) during the state visit of President Gloria Macapagal Arroyo in Japan. Construction of the expressway commenced on April 5, 2005 which established its right of way that marked the start of the expressway's existence. The expressway is the longest in the country, covering 93 kilometers (58 mi).

The original project for the expressway was divided into two segments: the 50.5-kilometer (31.4 mi) Subic-Clark segment and the 43.27-kilometer (26.89 mi) Clark-Tarlac segment. The contractors were a joint venture of Kajima, Obayashi, JFE Engineering, and Mitsubishi Heavy Industries for the Subic-Clark segment, and a joint venture of Hazama, Taisei, and Nippon Steel for the Clark-Tarlac segment. Consultation was provided by a joint venture of Oriental Consultant, Katahira & Engineering International, and Nippon Koei.

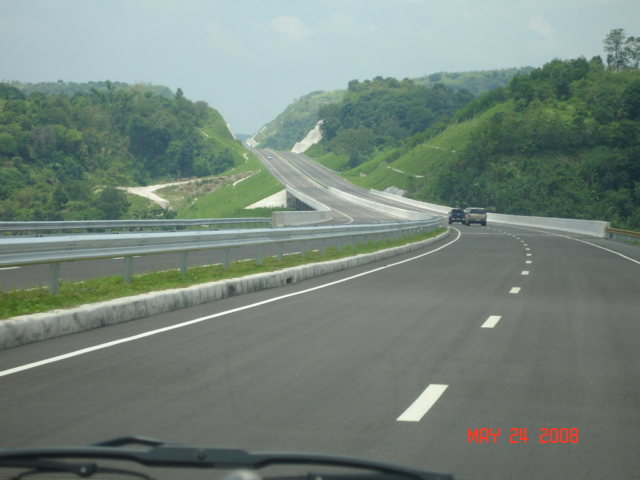
A portion of SCTEX on May 24, 2008

The total cost for the construction of the expressway was ₱34.957 billion. It was sourced through a loan of ¥41.93 billion or ₱23.06 billion from the Japan Bank for International Cooperation (JBIC), with an annual interest rate of 0.95%. ₱25.737 billion of the total project cost represented direct costs such as expenses incurred for the construction of the SCTEX. The indirect costs of ₱7.146 billion included land acquisition, consultancy services, project management expenses, and taxes and duties. Financing costs of ₱2.074 billion included the Department of Finance guarantee fee and JBIC loan interest during the construction period. Toll Fees were approved by the Toll Regulatory Board (TRB).

There was a plan to extend the expressway to La Union, covering 84.5 km (52.5 miles) from La Paz to Rosario, La Union. However, the project became TPLEX in 2007.

On March 18, 2008, President Gloria Macapagal Arroyo led the free Holy week dry run for the Subic–Clark segment of the expressway, dubbed “Handog ni Pangulong Gloria: Libreng Biyahe sa SCTEX.” On April 28 of the same year, the commerical operation of the expressway began, with the Subic–Clark segment.

On July 25, 2008, the BCDA announced the opening of the Clark–Tarlac segment of the expressway. Travel time from Clark to Tarlac was reduced to only 25 minutes, and to travel the entire length of the SCTEX would take about 1 hour. Travel from Manila to Tarlac City via NLEX and the SCTEX would take 1 hour and 25 minutes.

In 2015, the BCDA awarded the operations and maintenance contract for the expressway to the Manila North Tollways Corporation (MNTC, now NLEX Corporation). MNTC took over the management of the toll road on October 27. The seamless integration, which replaced the old tolling system — the old toll plazas were demolished — was completed in March 2016 to merge the two expressways into one system.

== Operations and maintenance ==
The expressway is part of the Bases Conversion and Development Authority's Subic–Clark–Tarlac Expressway Project or SCTEP, which aims to connect the economic zones of Subic and Clark. The joint venture of First Philippine Infrastructure Development Corporation (FPIDC), Tollways Management Corporation, and Egis Projects — the same concessionaires of the North Luzon Expressway — would handle all the operations and maintenance of the expressway. The First Philippine Infrastructure Development Corporation is a subsidiary of First Philippine Holdings, a holding company under the Lopez Group of Companies with core investments in power and tollways, and strategic initiatives in property and manufacturing. The FPIDC was eventually sold to Metro Pacific Investments Corporation in 2008.

The SCTEX business and operating agreement was signed in July 2011 between the BCDA and the Manila North Tollways Corporation (MNTC), and its holding companies Metro Pacific Tollways Corporation (MPTC) and Metro Pacific Investments Corporation (MPIC). Under the agreement, MNTC will operate and manage SCTEX for 33 years, while relieving BCDA of the heavy financial burden of paying the ₱34-billion debt to the Japan International Cooperation Agency (JICA). By virtue of the Agreement, the SCTEX can be considered as having been built at no cost to Government.

== Toll ==
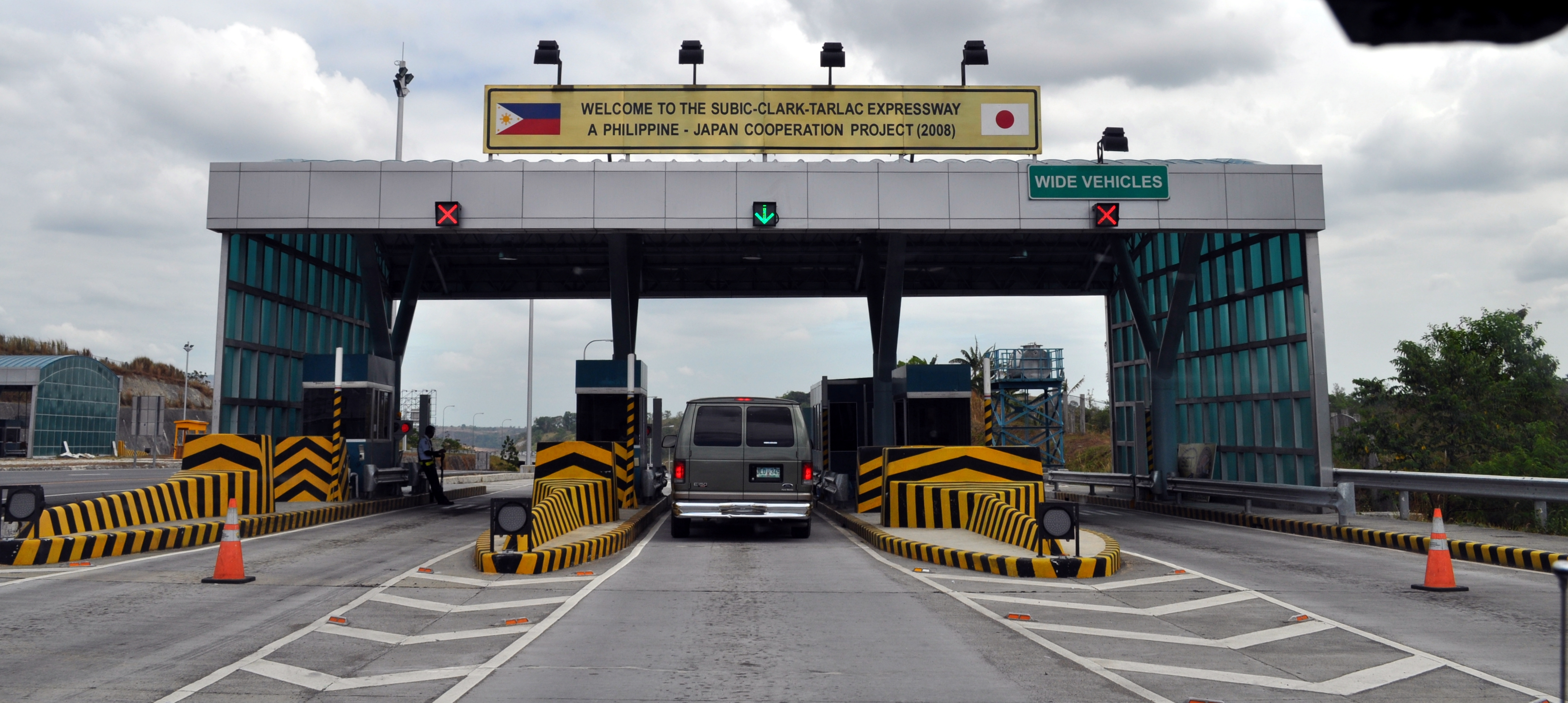
Tipo Toll Plaza (before the toll system integration with NLEx)

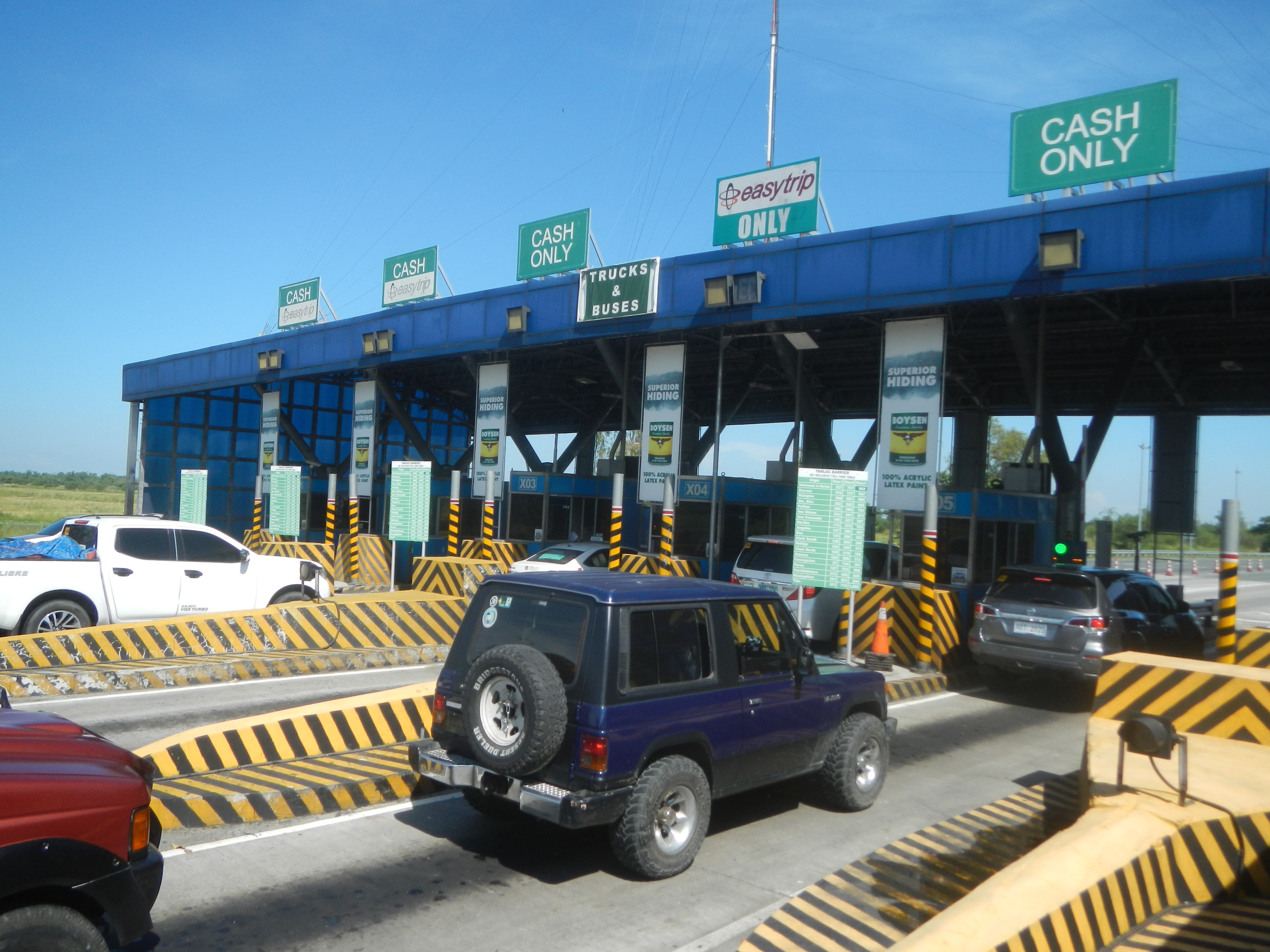
Tarlac Toll Plaza

Toll plazas of SCTEX

The toll system of Subic–Clark–Tarlac Expressway started out as a closed road system using cards with magnetic strips. In March 2016, electronic toll collection was initiated, using an 'Easytrip' system by Manila North Tollways Corporation and consolidating the toll system with that of the North Luzon Expressway. Before consolidation, the toll systems were completely independent, with toll collection at a toll plaza on Clark Spur Road in Mabalacat, until the structure's demolition following the toll systems' integration.

In March 2016, the integration of the North Luzon Expressway and the SCTEX was completed, in time for the Holy Week exodus. Among the integration plans which costed ₱650 million are the reduction of toll collection stops, construction of additional toll plazas and the conversion of the electronic toll collection of the two expressways into a single system.

With the government's push towards toll road interoperability, the Autosweep payment system from the San Miguel Corporation, which operates SLEX, Skyway, STAR Tollway, NAIAX, and TPLEX, has been accepted for SCTEX tolls since March 2018.

The toll rates, by distance travelled and vehicle class, are:

Class	Toll
Class 1 (Cars, Motorcycles, SUVs, Jeepneys)	₱5.89/km
Class 2 (Buses, Light Trucks)	₱11.78/km
Class 3 (Heavy Trucks)	₱17.67/km

== Services ==
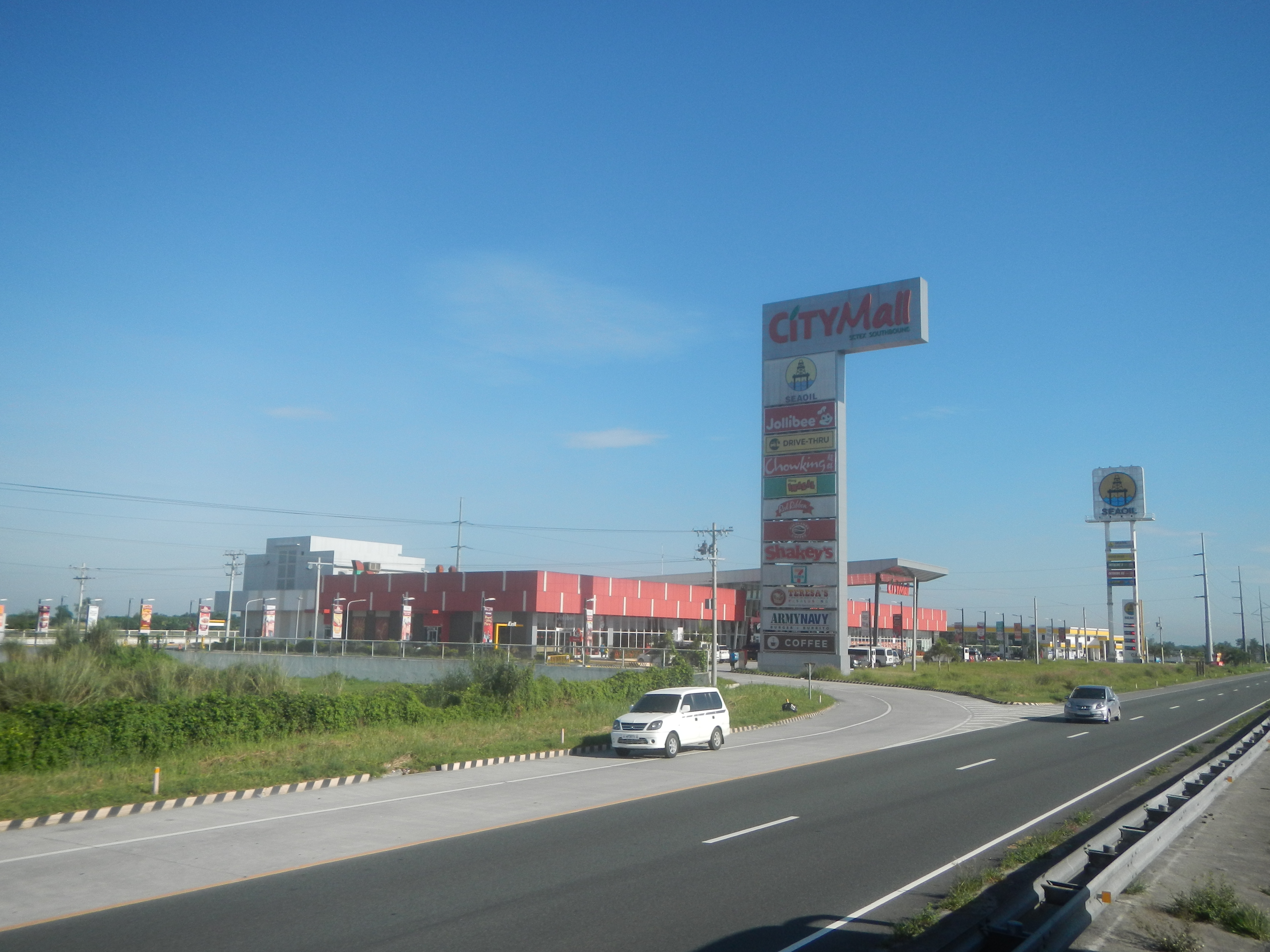
Seaoil service station with CityMall in Concepcion, Tarlac

From 2016, the SCTEx has two service areas in Concepcion, Tarlac, north of the Sacobia River. One of the service areas is on the northbound lanes and the other one is on the southbound lanes. The northbound service area is composed of a PTT gas station and a 7-Eleven store. The southbound service area is composed of a Seaoil gas station and CityMall shopping mall. Both service areas include a future expansion to accommodate additional retail and parking space.

== Exits ==
This entire route is located in Central Luzon. Exits are numbered by kilometer posts, with Rizal Park in Manila designated as kilometer zero.

Province	City/Municipality	km	mi	Exit	Name	Destinations	Notes
Bataan	Dinalupihan	143	89	143	Tipo	E4 (Subic Freeport Expressway) – Subic	Half-Y interchange; southbound exit and northbound entrance. Southern terminus; continues west as E4 (Subic Freeport Expressway)
Bataan	Dinalupihan	143	89	Tipo toll plaza			
Bataan	Dinalupihan			Tipo 2 Flyover			
Bataan	Hermosa	135	84	135	Mabiga	Mabiga	Under construction; access to Mabiga–Morong–Subic Port Road
Bataan	Dinalupihan	132.21– 131.72	82.15– 81.85	132	Dinalupihan	N301 (Roman Superhighway) – Dinalupihan, Hermosa	Trumpet interchange; connects with Roman Superhighway
Pampanga	Floridablanca	121	75	Rest stop (Southbound)			
Pampanga	Floridablanca	115	71	Rest stop (Northbound)			
Pampanga	Floridablanca			Gumain Bridge			
Pampanga	Floridablanca	113.7– 113.45	70.6– 70.49	113	Floridablanca	Floridablanca	Trumpet interchange; access to Basa Air Base
Pampanga	Porac			Porac Bridge			
Pampanga	Porac	100.00– 99.62	62.14– 61.90	100	Porac	Porac Access Road	Trumpet interchange; access to Alviera
Pampanga	Porac			Pasig–Potrero Bridge over the Pasig–Potrero River			
Pampanga	Angeles City	97.19– 96.89	60.39– 60.20	97	Montclair		Trumpet interchange under construction; access to Montclair Township
Pampanga	Mabalacat	90.19– 89.64	56.04– 55.70	90	Clark South	Clark Gateway – Clark Global City, Clark Freeport, Angeles City	Folded diamond interchange
Pampanga	Mabalacat	88.00	54.68	88	Clark Logistics	E1 (Clark Spur Road) – NLEX, Manila, Mabalacat	Trumpet interchange; route changes from E4 to E1; northern terminus of E4
Pampanga	Mabalacat	91.9– 92.1	57.1– 57.2	92	Clark North	Prince Balagtas Avenue – Clark Airport, Clark Freeport	Directional T interchange
Pampanga	Mabalacat	93	58	93	Dolores	N2 (MacArthur Highway) – Dolores, Bamban	Half partial cloverleaf interchange; northbound exit and entrance only; former northern terminus
Tarlac	Bamban			Sacobia–Bamban Main Bridge over the Sacobia River			
Tarlac	Bamban	100	62	100	New Clark City	New Clark City Access Road – Bamban, New Clark City, Capas	Trumpet interchange; limited access
Tarlac	Concepcion	101	63	PTT service area (Northbound)			
Tarlac	Concepcion	102	63	Seaoil service area (Southbound)			
Tarlac	Concepcion	103.8	64.5	104	Concepcion	N213 (Magalang–Concepcion Road) – Concepcion, Capas	Trumpet interchange
Tarlac	Tarlac City	117.742	73.161	118	Hacienda Luisita	Luisita Access Road – Hacienda Luisita, Santa Ignacia, Camiling	Half-trumpet / partial cloverleaf interchange; northbound exit and southbound entrance
Tarlac	Tarlac City			Luisita toll plaza (2013-2014; demolished)			
Tarlac	Tarlac City			Tarlac toll plaza (2016-present)			
Tarlac	Tarlac City	122	76	122	CLLEX / Tarlac City	N58 (Santa Rosa–Tarlac Road) / N308 (CLLEX) – Tarlac City, La Paz, Cabanatuan	Hybrid trumpet and diamond interchange; northbound exit and southbound entrance
Tarlac	Tarlac City			Northern terminus (SCTEX-TPLEX boundary) after Cut Cut Bridge and simultaneously with Tarlac City northbound exit; continues north to Baguio as E1 (Tarlac–Pangasinan–La Union Expressway)			
1.000 mi = 1.609 km; 1.000 km = 0.621 mi: Closed/former; Incomplete access; Tolled; Route transition; Unopened

=== Clark Spur Road ===
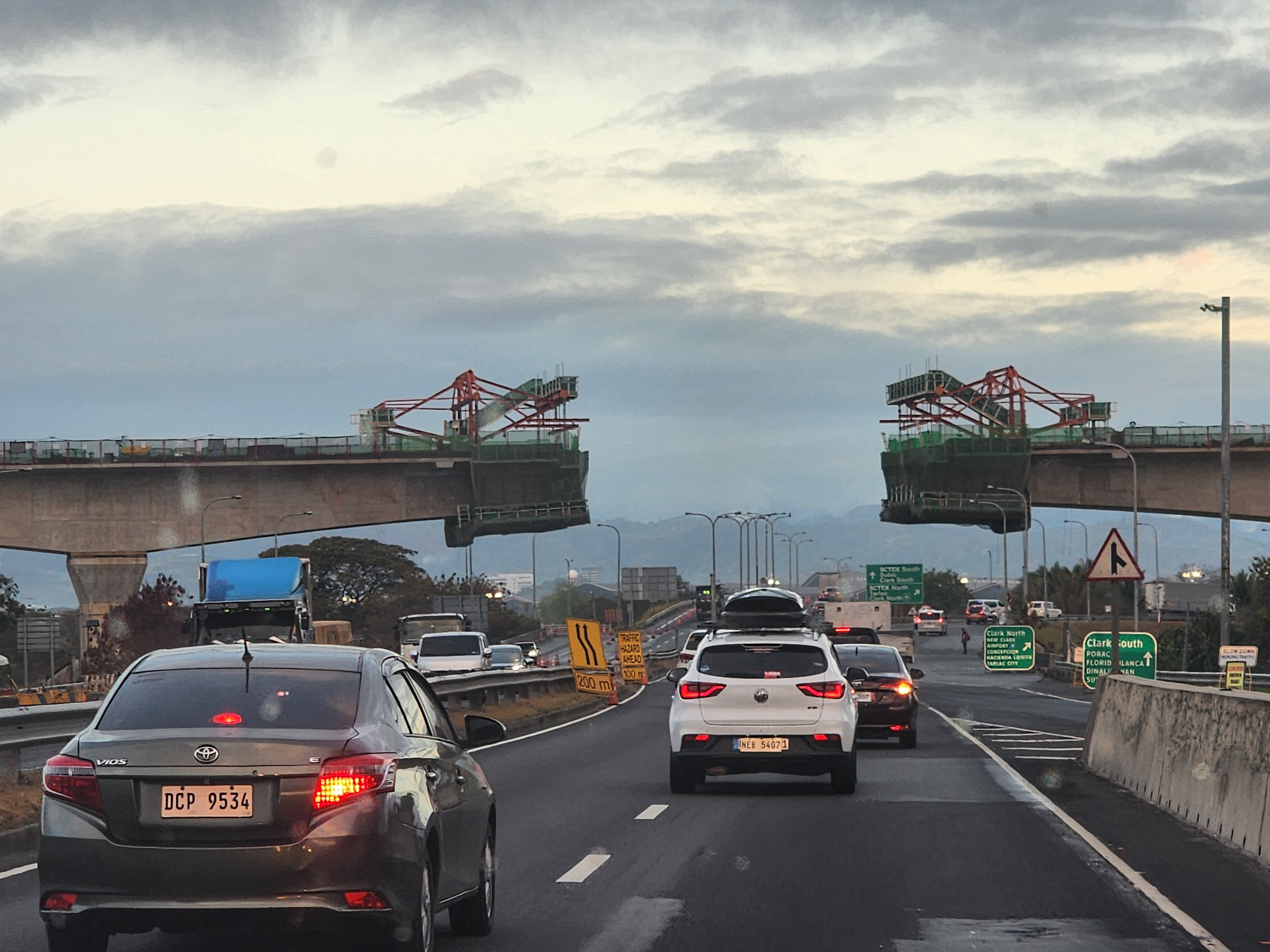
Clark Spur Road westbound at Mabiga Interchange, with the North–South Commuter Railway under construction in the background

The entire route is located in Mabalacat, Pampanga.

km	mi	Exit	Name	Destinations	Notes
85	53			E1 (NLEX) – Manila	Half trumpet interchange, Eastbound exit and westbound entrance; eastern terminus
85	53			SCTEX	At-grade U-turn slot; access for eastbound motorists only
87	54		Mabiga (Mabalacat)	N2 (MacArthur Highway) – Mabalacat	Diamond interchange
87	54	Mabalacat toll plaza (2008–2016, demolished)			
88	55		Clark Logistics	E1 / E4 (SCTEX Main) – Subic, Tarlac City, Baguio	Trumpet interchange; western terminus
1.000 mi = 1.609 km; 1.000 km = 0.621 mi: Closed/former; Incomplete access
