= Pangasinan Link Expressway =

Proposed expressway in the Philippines

Pangasinan Link Expressway

Route information
- Length: 42.76 km (26.57 mi)

Major junctions
- From: E1 (Tarlac–Pangasinan–La Union Expressway) in Binalonan
- To: Lingayen

Location
- Country: Philippines
- Provinces: Pangasinan

Highway system
- Roads in the Philippines; Highways; Expressways; List

The Pangasinan Link Expressway, abbreviated as PLEX, is a proposed 42.76-kilometer (26.57 mi) controlled-access highway project located in the province of Pangasinan, Philippines. It operates as a joint venture between the Provincial Government of Pangasinan and San Miguel Holdings Corporation.

== History ==
=== Conceptualization ===
The project was conceived when House Bill 4126 was filed in 2019 during the 18th Congress by Pangasinan 5th District Representative Ramon Guico III. The legislative proposal outlined an arterial road to connect the eastern and western municipalities of the province. Following the election of Guico as provincial governor, the infrastructure initiative was structured under a public private partnership framework.

=== Unsolicited proposal ===
Prior to the SMC agreement, the provincial government received a letter of intent on July 11, 2022, from the SAHI-DMCU Consortium, an organization of Indonesian and Filipino companies. The consortium proposed the Pangasinan East West Expressway (PEWEx) to connect TPLEX to Alaminos City. The Sangguniang Panlalawigan (Provincial Board) issued Provincial Resolution No. 644-2022 to confirm the governor's authority to accept the PEWEx proposal for review.

To facilitate local public-private partnerships, the Sangguniang Panlalawigan enacted Provincial Ordinance No. 290-2022, known as the Provincial Government of Pangasinan Joint Venture Code (PGP JV Code), on December 5, 2022. This ordinance provided the legal mechanism for the province to enter into joint venture agreements without relying solely on national procurement channels.

In May 2023, San Miguel Holdings Corporation submitted an unsolicited proposal for the PLEX project to the province's Joint Venture Selection Committee. Following the procedures of the PGP JV Code, the provincial government initiated a Swiss Challenge to invite comparative proposals from other private sector participants. The Invitation to Apply for Eligibility and to Submit a Proposal (IAESP) was published in a newspaper of general circulation on June 1, 2023, and posted on government portals. The deadline for challengers was set for July 7, 2023, at 5:01 PM. No other private sector entities submitted comparative proposals by the deadline.

=== Approval and Joint venture agreement ===
Following the conclusion of the Swiss Challenge, the Joint Venture Selection Committee recommended awarding the project to SMHC as the original proponent on July 8, 2023. On July 10, 2023, the Sangguniang Panlalawigan unanimously passed Provincial Resolution No. 606-2023, which formally authorized Governor Guico to enter into and sign the Joint Venture Agreement and Tollway Concession Agreement with SMHC.

The official signing of the agreements took place on October 19, 2023, at the Sison Auditorium in Lingayen. Under the terms of the agreement, SMC assumes all financial risks and construction costs, estimated at PHP 34 billion for Phase 1, with zero capital expenditure required from the provincial government. In return, the province will receive a 5% share of toll revenues and a 30% share of earnings before taxes from commercial developments along the expressway. The profit-sharing rate for the province increases to 70% if the project's internal rate of return (PIRR) exceeds 12%. After the 35-year concession period, ownership of the PLEX infrastructure will be transferred to the provincial government.

=== Groundbreaking ===
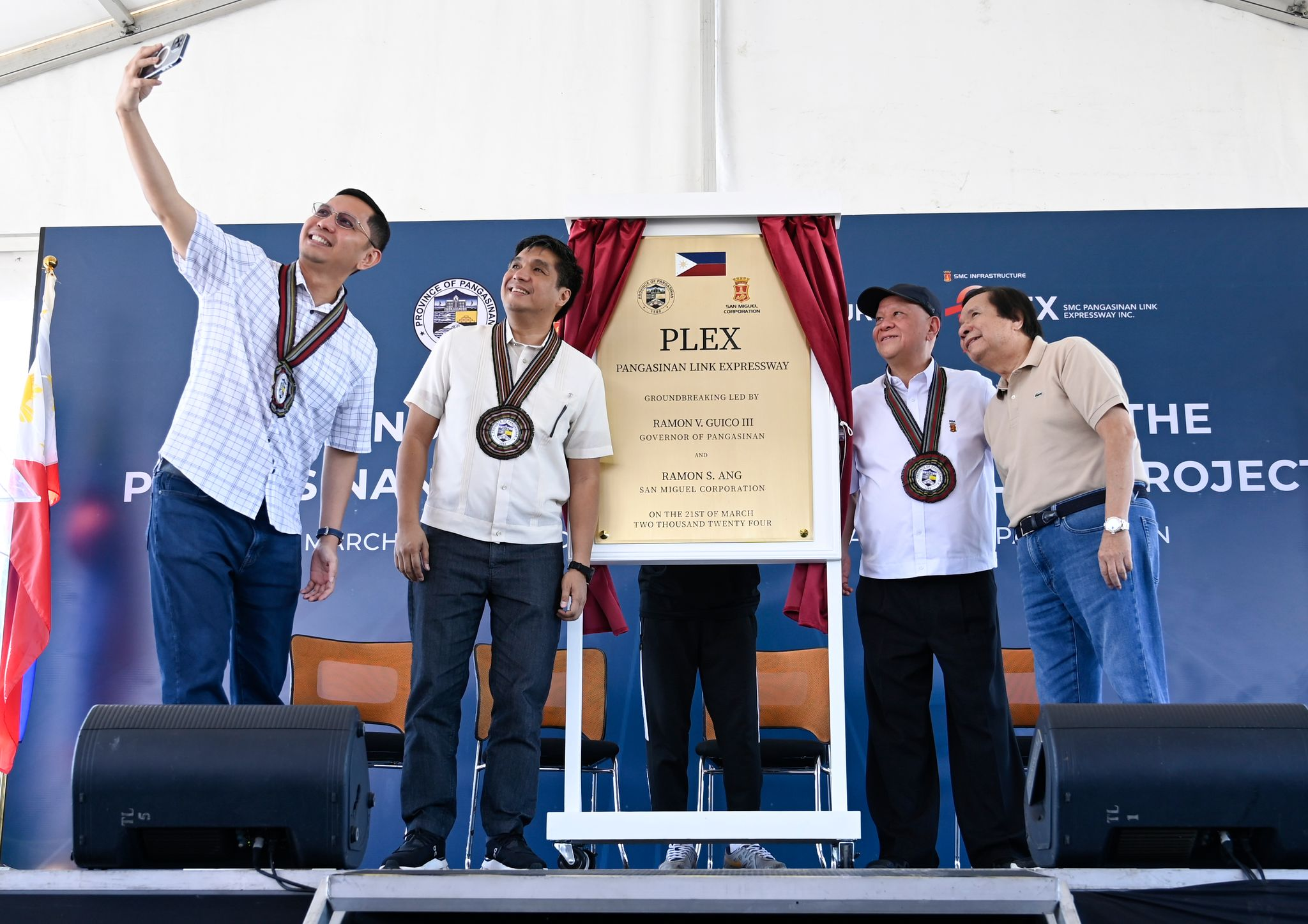
Groundbreaking in the municipality of Laoac.

A groundbreaking ceremony for Phase 1 was held on March 21, 2024, at Barangay Balligi in the municipality of Laoac. The event was led by SMC President and CEO Ramon S. Ang and Governor Ramon V. Guico III.

== Technical specifications and Route alignment ==
PLEX is designed as a four-lane, controlled-access toll expressway. The project is structured in two main phases.

=== Phase 1 (Eastern to Central Pangasinan) ===
Construction for Phase 1 has an estimated cost of 34.34 billion Philippine pesos.

Phase 1 covers a total of 42.76 kilometers and is divided into three segments and one spur road:

- Segment 1: Binalonan to Manaoag (6.90 kilometers). This segment will directly connect to the TPLEX Binalonan exit.
- Segment 2: Manaoag to Calasiao (11.30 kilometers).
- Segment 3: Calasiao to Lingayen (22.17 kilometers).
- Spur Road: A 2.39-kilometer access road located in Calasiao.

Engineering estimates project that the completed road will reduce travel time between Binalonan and Lingayen from approximately 90 minutes to 30 minutes.

=== Phase 2 (Western Pangasinan) ===
Phase 2 is a proposed extension from Lingayen to Alaminos City. SMC and the provincial government have stated that Phase 2 will be a demand-driven expansion contingent upon traffic volumes and economic feasibility realized after the completion of Phase 1.

== Economic impact and Regional integration ==
The primary objective of PLEX is to reduce travel time between the eastern and western municipalities of Pangasinan. Travel from Binalonan to Lingayen, which historically took 90 to 100 minutes via existing local roads, is projected to be reduced to approximately 20 to 30 minutes upon the completion of Phase 1. The expressway is intended to function as an economic corridor, integrating local agricultural and commercial zones with the broader Luzon highway network. SMC executives have noted that PLEX will provide Pangasinan with direct, high-speed access to the New Manila International Airport (NMIA) under construction in Bulacan. Local officials anticipate the infrastructure will increase property values along the alignment, stimulate the tourism industry in coastal towns, and facilitate faster transport of goods to markets.
