= Subic Freeport Expressway =

Toll highway from Olongapo to Dinalupihan, Philippines

Subic Freeport Expressway
- Subic–Tipo Expressway; Subic–Tipo Road; NLEX Segment 7
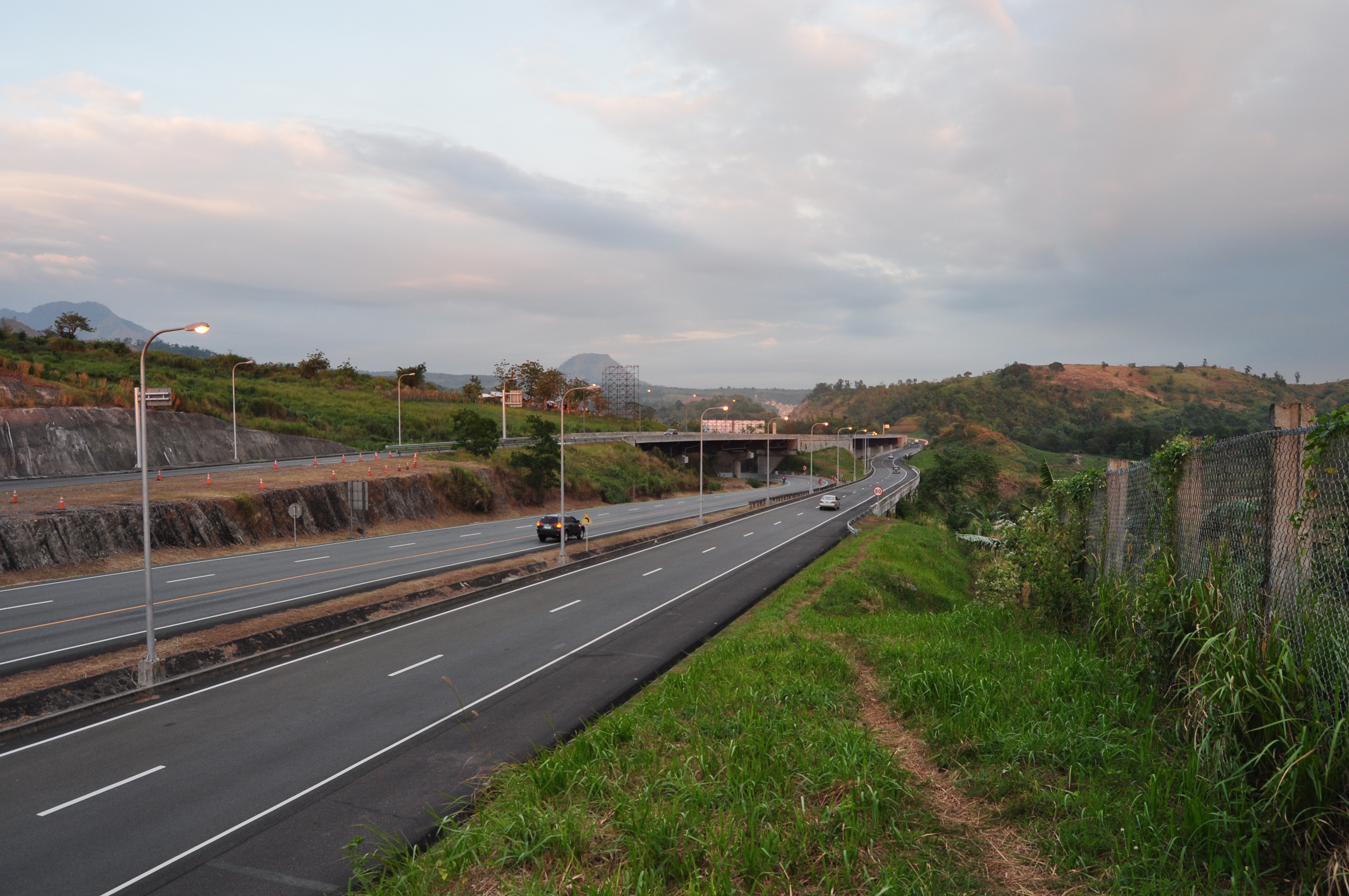
- View of the expressway eastward to Subic–Clark–Tarlac Expressway in Dinalupihan

Route information
- Maintained by NLEX Corporation
- Length: 8.8 km (5.5 mi)
- Existed: 1996–present
- Component highways: E4

Major junctions
- East end: N3 (Jose Abad Santos Avenue) in Dinalupihan
- E4 (Subic–Clark–Tarlac Expressway) in Dinalupihan
- West end: Rizal Highway and Maritan Highway in Subic Freeport Zone, Olongapo

Location
- Country: Philippines
- Provinces: Bataan, Zambales
- Major cities: Olongapo
- Towns: Dinalupihan and Morong

Highway system
- Roads in the Philippines; Highways; Expressways; List

The Subic Freeport Expressway (SFEX), formerly the Subic–Tipo Road, Subic–Tipo Expressway and North Luzon Expressway Segment 7 (NLEX Segment 7), is an 8.8-kilometer (5.5 mi) four-lane expressway that connects the Subic–Clark–Tarlac Expressway to the Subic Bay Freeport Zone in Olongapo City, Philippines. Its alignment traverses the provinces of Bataan and Zambales.

The expressway forms part of Expressway 4 (E4) of the Philippine expressway network.

== Route description ==
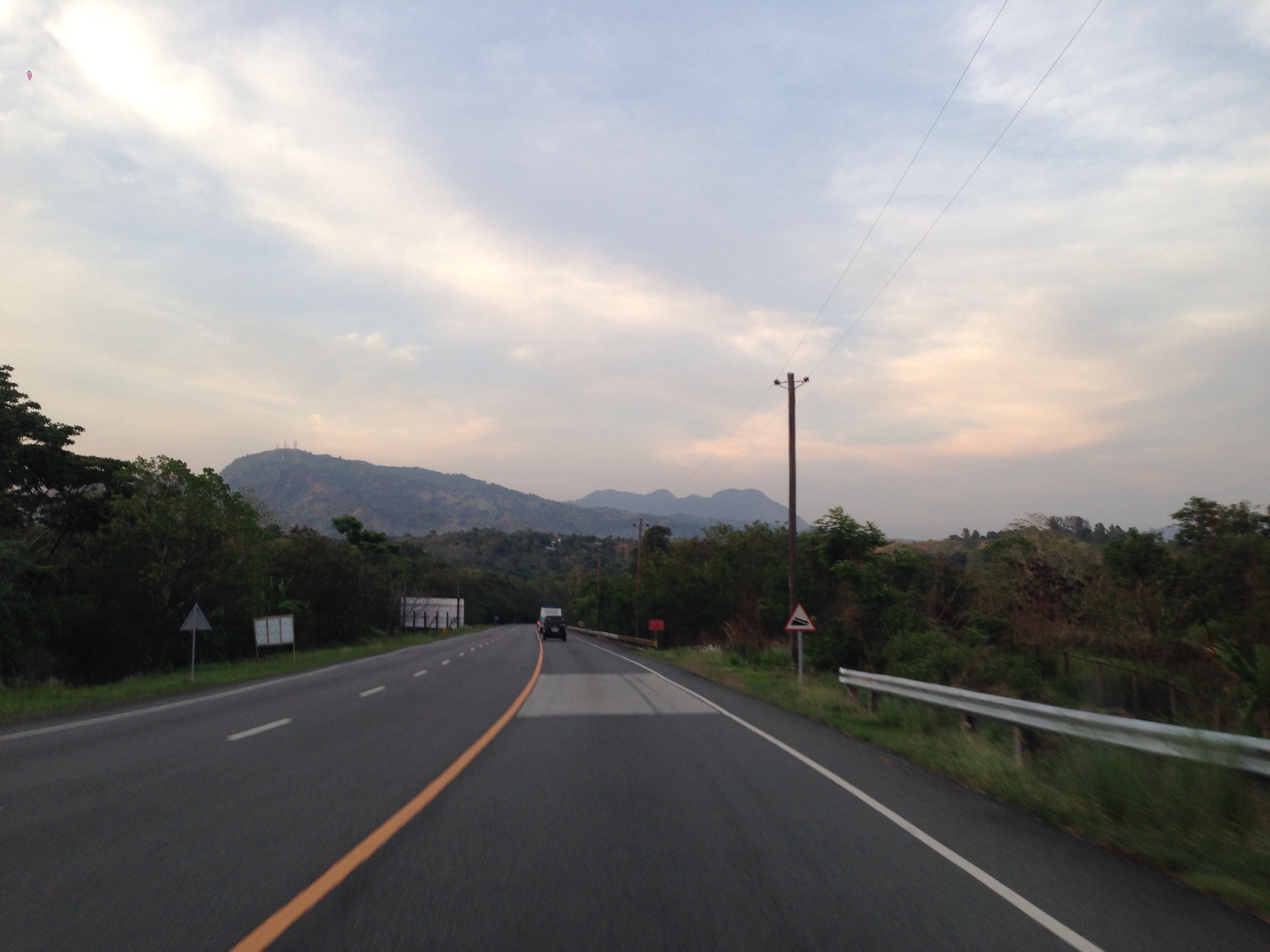
SFEX before the capacity expansion project

Beginning at the intersection of Rizal and Maritan Highways, the expressway runs northward, traversing the wetlands of the former Naval Exchange and going towards Argonaut Highway. The alignment curves to the right as it crosses Argonaut Highway and goes up as it enters the Bataan National Park. The alignment then veers in a southeasterly direction, traversing the side slopes of the mountain. The road enters Bataan, exiting the national park. There are two Total service areas: one before the Subic Bay Metropolitan Authority (SBMA) security checkpoint for southbound lanes and one near the checkpoint for northbound lanes. It would then curve westward, eastward, pass into one river, and repeat in the same direction. There is an overpass after passing the bridge and before entering Subic–Clark–Tarlac Expressway (SCTEX). Upon entering SCTEX, there is a toll plaza and the road forks into two: the left towards Jose Abad Santos Avenue (Olongapo–Gapan Road) and the right is a toll plaza leading to SCTEX.

== History ==
The road, initially known as the Subic–Tipo Road, was built in preparation for the 1996 APEC summit that would be held in the Subic Bay Freeport Zone. Built by the López-owned First Philippine Infrastructure Development Corporation (now known as Metro Pacific Investments), the road was inaugurated by Philippine President Fidel V. Ramos on October 13, 1996, one month ahead of the summit. Toll operations began in May 1997.

When the North Luzon Expressway was being planned for rehabilitation, the Subic Expressway's proposed route, which would span roughly 64.2 kilometers (39.9 mi) between NLEX in San Simon, Pampanga, and Subic, was being considered. The project's planned sections, referred to as NLEX Phase 3:

- San Simon to Guagua (17 km)
- Guagua to Dinalupihan (31 km)
- Dinalupihan to Tipo (10.5 km)
- Tipo to Subic (8 km; existing)

Despite this, Segment 7 was constructed. However, when SCTEX assumed control of Segment 6 of the NLEX Phase 3, the entire project did not come to fruition.

=== Expansion ===
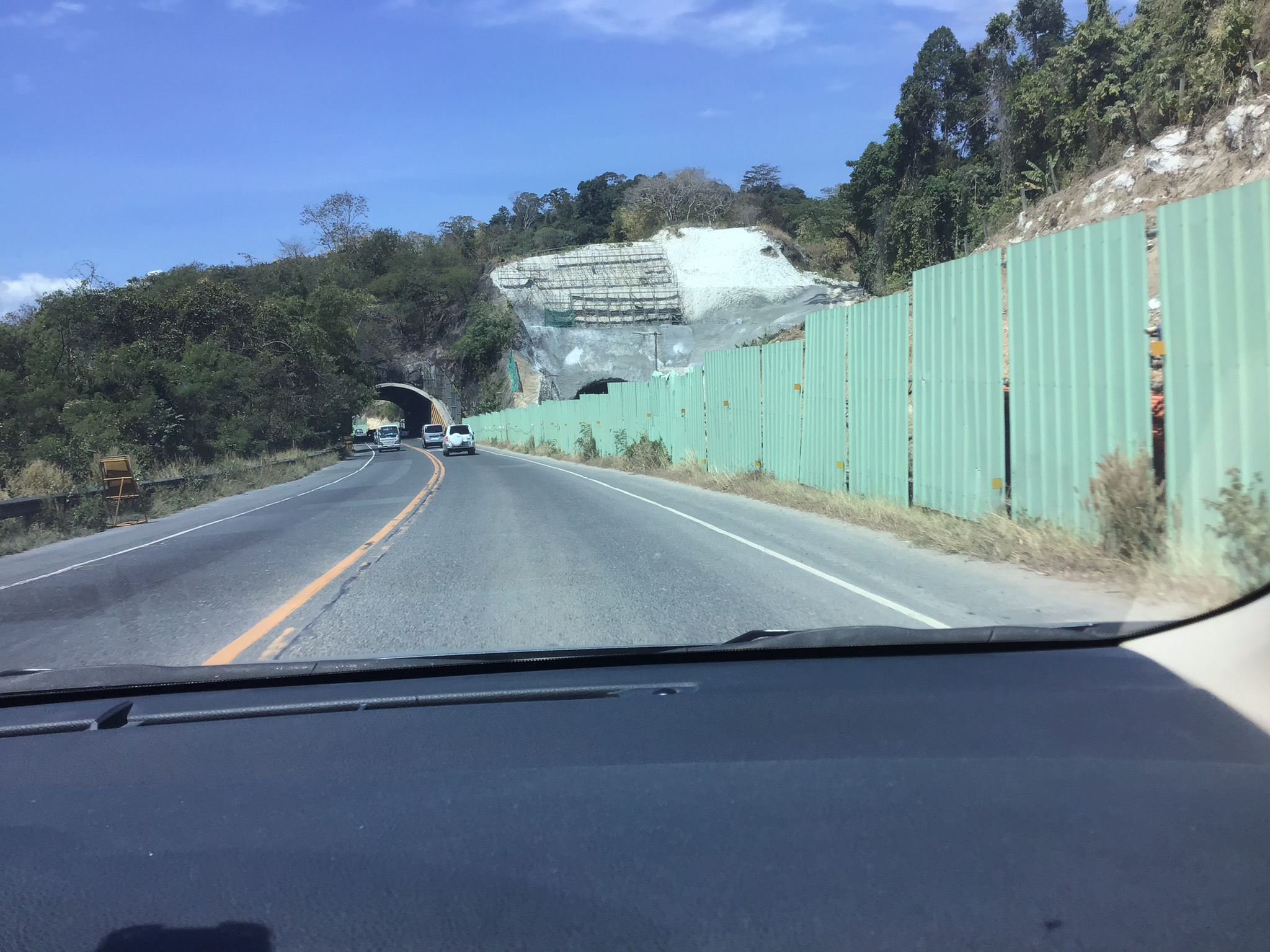
SFEX tunnel during the capacity expansion project

As part of NLEX Corporation's expansion and improvement of its toll roads, the expressway was expanded to accommodate an additional carriageway, including two bridges and a tunnel parallel to the existing ones.

The groundbreaking ceremony of the expansion project was held on September 12, 2019. It was expected to be completed in September 2020 but was delayed due to the COVID-19 pandemic. The new carriageway and expansion was opened to traffic on February 19, 2021.

== Toll ==
Subic Freeport Expressway (SFEX) employs a barrier toll system in which motorists pay a fixed toll rate for using only the expressway. Toll collection is conducted at the SFEX Toll Plaza in Tipo.

Motorists originating from SCTEX are charged toll rates based on the distance traveled from their entry point at SCTEX or NLEX when they enter SFEX at Tipo Interchange. Tickets are issued to eastbound vehicles from SFEX upon entry onto SCTEX at Tipo Interchange, and these vehicles are charged at their respective exit points on SCTEX or NLEX. This system has been used since SCTEX and NLEX integrated a closed system in 2016.

The expressway's electronic toll collection (ETC) system uses devices branded Easytrip by its concessionaire, NLEX Corporation. Collection is done on mixed lanes at the toll barriers.

Tolls are charged based on class. Under the law, all toll rates include a 12% value-added tax. The toll rates, implemented since June 4, 2024, are as follows:

Class	Toll
Class 1 (Cars, Motorcycles, SUVs, Jeepneys)	₱44.00
Class 2 (Buses, Light Trucks)	₱111.00
Class 3 (Heavy Trucks)	₱133.00

== Exits ==
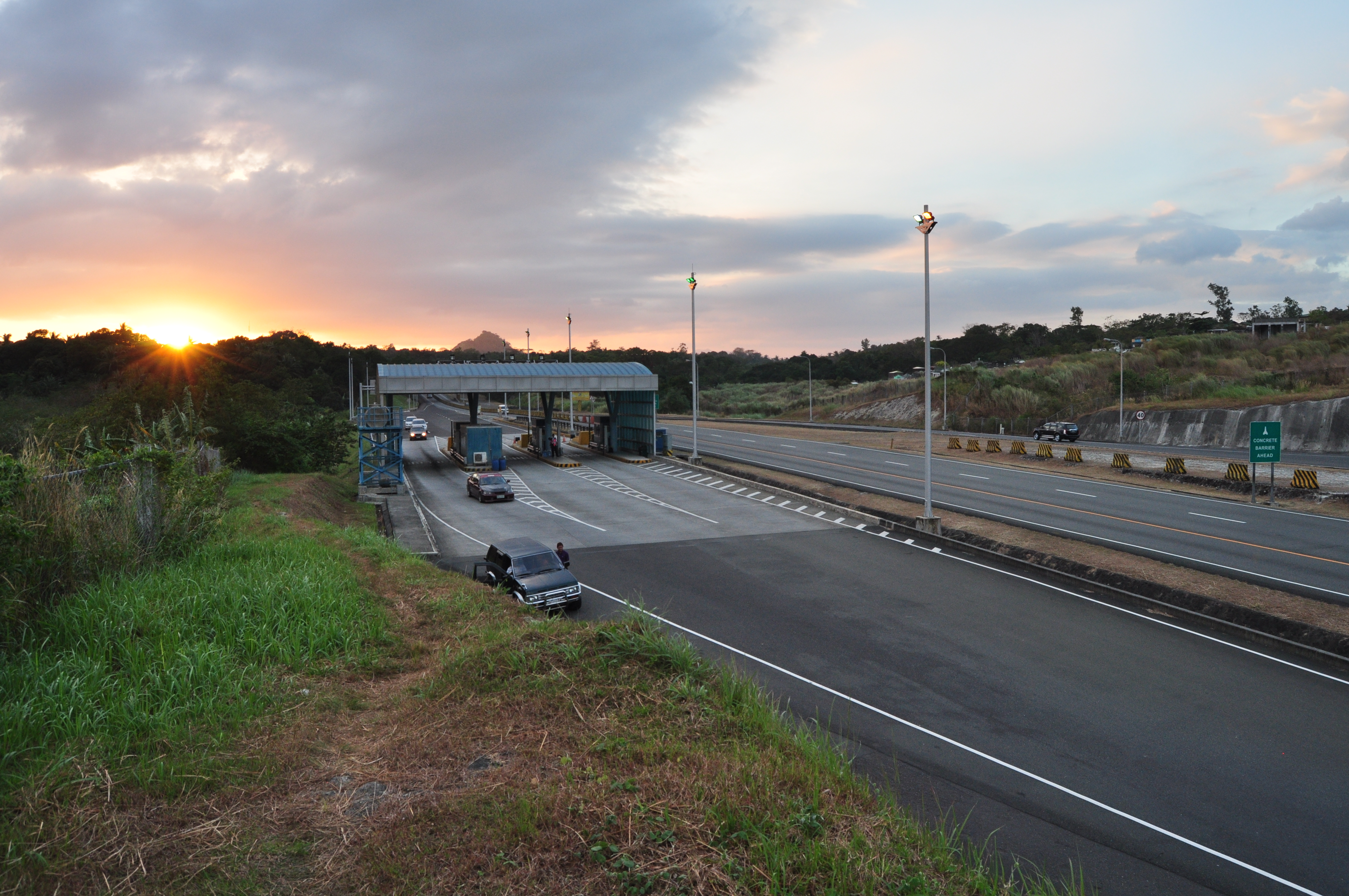
Tipo Interchange in Dinalupihan, Bataan, before the toll system integration with NLEx

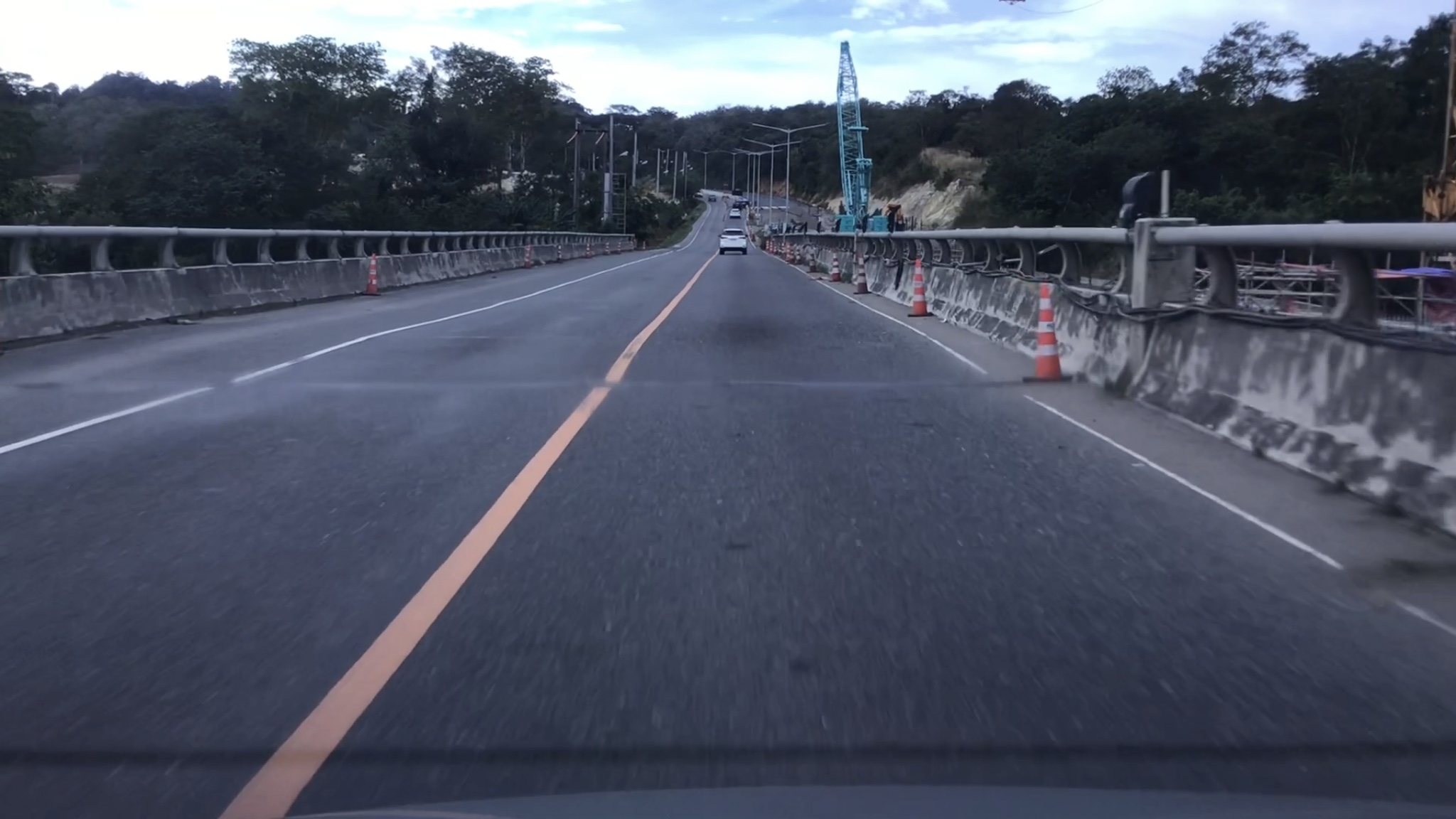
Jadjad Bridge

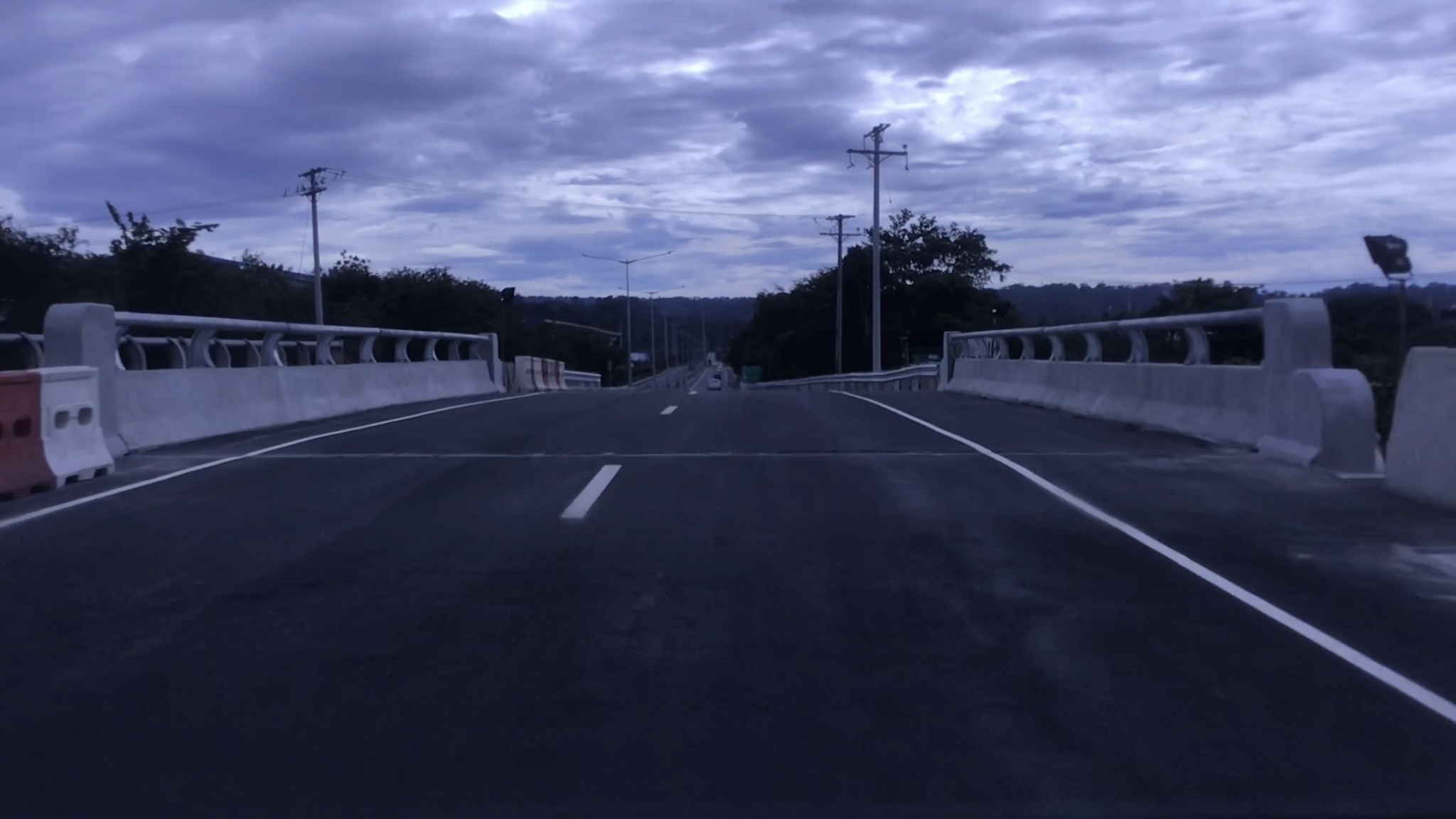
Argonaut Bridge

SFEX bridges

This entire route is located in Central Luzon. Exits will be numbered by kilometer posts, with Rizal Park in Manila designated as kilometer zero.

Province	City/Municipality	km	mi	Destinations	Notes
Bataan	Dinalupihan	143	89	N3 (Jose Abad Santos Avenue)	Eastern terminus
Bataan	Dinalupihan	143	89	SFEX toll plaza (2016–present)	
Bataan	Dinalupihan	143	89	E4 (SCTEX) – Clark, Manila, Tarlac City, Baguio	Eastbound exit and westbound entrance
Bataan	Dinalupihan	144	89	Subic–Tipo toll plaza (1997–2016, demolished)	
Bataan	Morong			Jadjad Bridge	
Bataan	Morong	146	91	Subic Bay Metropolitan Authority security checkpoint	
Bataan	Morong	146	91	Total (Subic Tipo 2) service area (westbound)	
Bataan	Morong	146	91	Holy Land Subic Sanctuary	Trumpet interchange; westbound access via Total (Subic Tipo 2)
Bataan	Morong	146	91	Total (Subic Tipo) service area (eastbound)	
Bataan	Morong			SFEX Tunnel	
Zambales	Olongapo	148	92	Argonaut Highway	T intersection, former access to Argonaut Highway
Zambales	Olongapo			Argonaut Bridge	
Zambales	Olongapo	150	93	Rizal Highway / Maritan Highway	Western terminus
1.000 mi = 1.609 km; 1.000 km = 0.621 mi: Closed/former; Incomplete access; Tolled

== See also ==
- Philippine expressway network
- List of expressways in the Philippines
