= NLEX Corporation =

Subsidiary of Metro Pacific Investments Corporation

- Type: Subsidiary
- Industry: Transportation
- Founded: 1997; 29 years ago
- Founder: Lopez Holdings Corporation
- Headquarters: Caloocan, Metro Manila, Philippines
- Area served: Philippines
- Key people: Manuel V. Pangilinan (Chairman); Jose Luigi L. Bautista (President and CEO)
- Services: Tollway operation and maintenance
- Parent: Metro Pacific Investments Corporation
- Website: nlex.com.ph

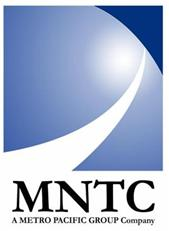
Old logo (1997-2018)

NLEX Corporation (Full name: North Luzon Expressway Corporation; formerly Manila North Tollways Corporation) is a subsidiary of Metro Pacific Tollways Corporation (MPTC), a company owned by Metro Pacific Investments Corporation (PSE: MPI). It holds the concession rights to construct, operate and maintain the North Luzon Expressway (NLEX) and Subic–Clark–Tarlac Expressway (SCTEX). The company was acquired by the Metro Pacific group from Lopez Holdings Corporation in August 2008.

== MNTC–TMC merger ==
In November 2016, MNTC shareholders approved its merger with Tollways Management Corporation (TMC), with MNTC as the surviving company. TMC was engaged in the operations and maintenance of tollways, its facilities, interchanges and related works. The shareholders also approved the change of the name of MNTC to NLEX Corporation. The SEC approved the name change on February 13, 2017. The MNTC and NLEX Corporation logos and names were concurrently used from 2017 to 2018.

== Basketball teams ==
- NLEX Road Warriors (Philippine Basketball Association)
- NLEX Road Warriors (PBA D-League)
- NLEX (Pilipinas Commercial Basketball League)
