= List of expressways in the Philippines =

Philippine expressway network

Highway names

System links
- Roads in the Philippines; Highways; Expressways; List

This list of expressways in the Philippines is currently composed of ten controlled-access highways that connects Metro Manila to the provinces located in north and south Luzon. While not all expressways are interconnected, there is a plan to connect all expressways to form the Philippine expressway network.

Since 2020, all expressways in Luzon have been connected to each other.

== Numbered routes ==
Number	Length (km)	Length (mi)	Names	Northern/eastern terminus	Southern/western terminus	Formed	Notes
E1	88.4	54.9	North Luzon Expressway	Route 213 (Mabalacat–Magalang Road) in Santa Ines, Mabalacat, Pampanga	Route 1 (EDSA) / Route 160 (Andres Bonifacio Avenue) in Balintawak, Quezon City	1968	Asian Highway 26 between Santa Rita, Guiguinto and Balintawak
E1	132.5	82.3	Subic–Clark–Tarlac Expressway (Mabalacat–Tarlac City segment); Tarlac–Pangasinan–La Union Expressway	Route 2 (Manila North Road) in Rosario, La Union	E1 (North Luzon Expressway) in Mabalacat, Pampanga	2005	
E2	92	57	South Luzon Expressway; Southern Tagalog Arterial Road	Route 1 (EDSA) / Route 145 (Osmeña Highway) in Makati	Route 4 (Jose P. Laurel Highway) / Route 434 (Batangas Port Diversion Road) in Balagtas, Batangas City	1969	Asian Highway 26 between Magallanes and Calamba
E2	42.79	26.59	Skyway	E1 (North Luzon Expressway) in Caloocan	E2 (South Luzon Expressway) in Muntinlupa	1998	Partially signed as E2/Asian Highway 26 between Buendia, Makati and Alabang, Muntinlupa
E2	2.7	1.7	Muntinlupa–Cavite Expressway	E2 (South Luzon Expressway) in Muntinlupa	Daang Hari in Poblacion, Muntinlupa	2015	Spur route of E2
E3	14	8.7	Manila–Cavite Expressway	E6 (NAIA Expressway); Route 61 (Roxas Boulevard); Route 194 (NAIA Road) in Tambo, Parañaque	Route 62 (Tirona Highway); Route 64 (Centennial Road) in Kawit, Cavite	1985	
E3	44.6	27.6	Cavite–Laguna Expressway	E3 (CAVITEX) in Kawit, Cavite	E2 (South Luzon Expressway) in Biñan, Laguna	2019	Partial operation between Silang East, Silang and Mamplasan, Biñan
E4	58.7	36.5	Subic–Clark–Tarlac Expressway (Mabalacat–Dinalupihan segment); Subic Freeport Expressway	E1 in Mabalacat, Pampanga	Rizal Highway and Maritan Highway in Subic Freeport	1996	
E5	13.4	8.3	NLEX Harbor Link; NLEX Mindanao Avenue Link; NLEX Karuhatan Link	Route 128 (Mindanao Avenue) in Ugong, Valenzuela	Route 120 (R-10) in Navotas	2009	
E5	7.7	4.8	C-5 Southlink Expressway	Route 11 (C-5 Road) in Taguig	E3 (CAVITEX) in San Dionisio, Parañaque, near the border of Las Piñas	2019	Partial operation between C-5 and Pasay (near Merville), and between Sucat and CAVITEX
E5	32.6	20.2	Southeast Metro Manila Expressway	Batasan Road in Batasan Hills, Quezon City	E2 (Skyway) in Taguig	under construction	
E6	11.9	7.4	NAIA Expressway	E2 (Skyway) in Taguig	Macapagal Boulevard in Parañaque	2016	
1.000 mi = 1.609 km; 1.000 km = 0.621 mi: Proposed and unbuilt

== Unnumbered routes ==
Name	Length (km)	Length (mi)	Northern/eastern terminus	Southern/western terminus	Formed	Notes
Cebu–Cordova Link Expressway	8.9	5.5	Route 845 (Manuel L. Quezon National Highway) in Cordova, Cebu	Route 840 (Cebu South Coastal Road) in Cebu City	2022	
Central Luzon Link Expressway	66	41	E1 (SCTEX) in Tarlac City	Route 1 (Maharlika Highway) in San Jose, Nueva Ecija	2021	Part of N308 (Tarlac City to La Paz). Partial operation between Tarlac City and Cabanatuan.
NLEX Connector	7.7	4.8	E5 (NLEX Harbor Link) in Caloocan	Skyway in Santa Mesa, Manila	2023	Partial operation between Caloocan and Magsaysay Boulevard.
Metro Cebu Expressway	73.7	45.8	Route 81 (Naga–Uling Road) in Naga, Cebu	Route 8 (Cebu North Road) in Danao, Cebu	under construction	
North Luzon East Expressway	92.1	57.2	E5 (NLEX Segment 8.2) in Quezon City	CLLEX in Cabanatuan, Nueva Ecija	under construction	
South Luzon Expressway Toll Roads 4 and 5	484	300	E2 (SLEX Toll Road 3) in Calamba, Laguna	Route 1 (Maharlika Highway) in Matnog, Sorsogon	under construction	
1.000 mi = 1.609 km; 1.000 km = 0.621 mi: Proposed and unbuilt

== Planned/proposed ==
North Luzon

- Tarlac–Pangasinan–La Union Expressway Extension (Rosario to San Juan, La Union)
- North Eastern Luzon Expressway (NELEX) (San Jose, Nueva Ecija to Cabbaroguis, Quirino or Santiago City, Isabela)
- Pangasinan Link Expressway (PLEX)
  - Phase 1 (Binalonan to Lingayen)
  - Phase 2 (Lingayen to Alaminos)
- Dalton Pass East Alignment Road

Metro Manila

- C-5 Expressway (Taguig to Luzon Avenue, Quezon City)
- Manila–Bataan Coastal Road Extension (Navotas-Bataan Boundary Bridge)
- Manila–Taguig Expressway/Pasig River Expressway (Manila to Taguig via Pasig River - ultimately scrapped due to severe backlash)
- Northern Access Link Expressway (NALEX)
  - Segment 1 (Caloocan to Meycauayan)
  - Segment 2 (Meycauayan to Tarlac City)
- Southern Access Link Expressway (SALEX)
  - Section 1 (Caloocan to San Nicolas, Manila)
  - Section 2 (San Nicolas, Manila to Pasay via University Belt and Roxas Boulevard)
  - Section 3 (Manila)
  - Section 4 (Pasay)
- R-7 Expressway (España Boulevard in Manila to C-6 in Rizal)

South Luzon

- Laguna Lakeshore Expressway Dike
  - Phase 1 (Taguig to Cabuyao)
  - Phase 2 (Cabuyao to Los Baños)
- Cavite–Batangas Expressway (Silang, Cavite to Nasugbu, Batangas)
- Nasugbu–Bauan Expressway (Nasugbu, Batangas, to Bauan, Batangas)

Visayas

- Iloilo–Capiz–Aklan Expressway (ICAEx) (Leganes, Iloilo to Malay, Aklan)

Mindanao

- Davao City Expressway
- Central Mindanao Expressway (Tagoloan, Misamis Oriental to Malaybalay, Bukidnon)

== See also ==
- Philippine expressway network
- List of toll roads
