= Quezon Avenue (disambiguation) =

Quezon Avenue primarily is a road in Quezon City, Philippines.

Quezon Avenue may also refer to the following roads in the Philippines:

- Quezon Avenue in Camiling, Tarlac, part of Romulo Highway
- Quezon Avenue in Angono, Rizal, part of Manila East Road
- Quezon Avenue in San Fernando, La Union, part of Manila North Road
- Quezon Avenue in Cotabato City and Sultan Kudarat, Maguindanao del Norte, part of Pan-Philippine Highway
