= Central Luzon Link Expressway =

Expressway in Central Luzon, Philippines

Central Luzon Link Expressway

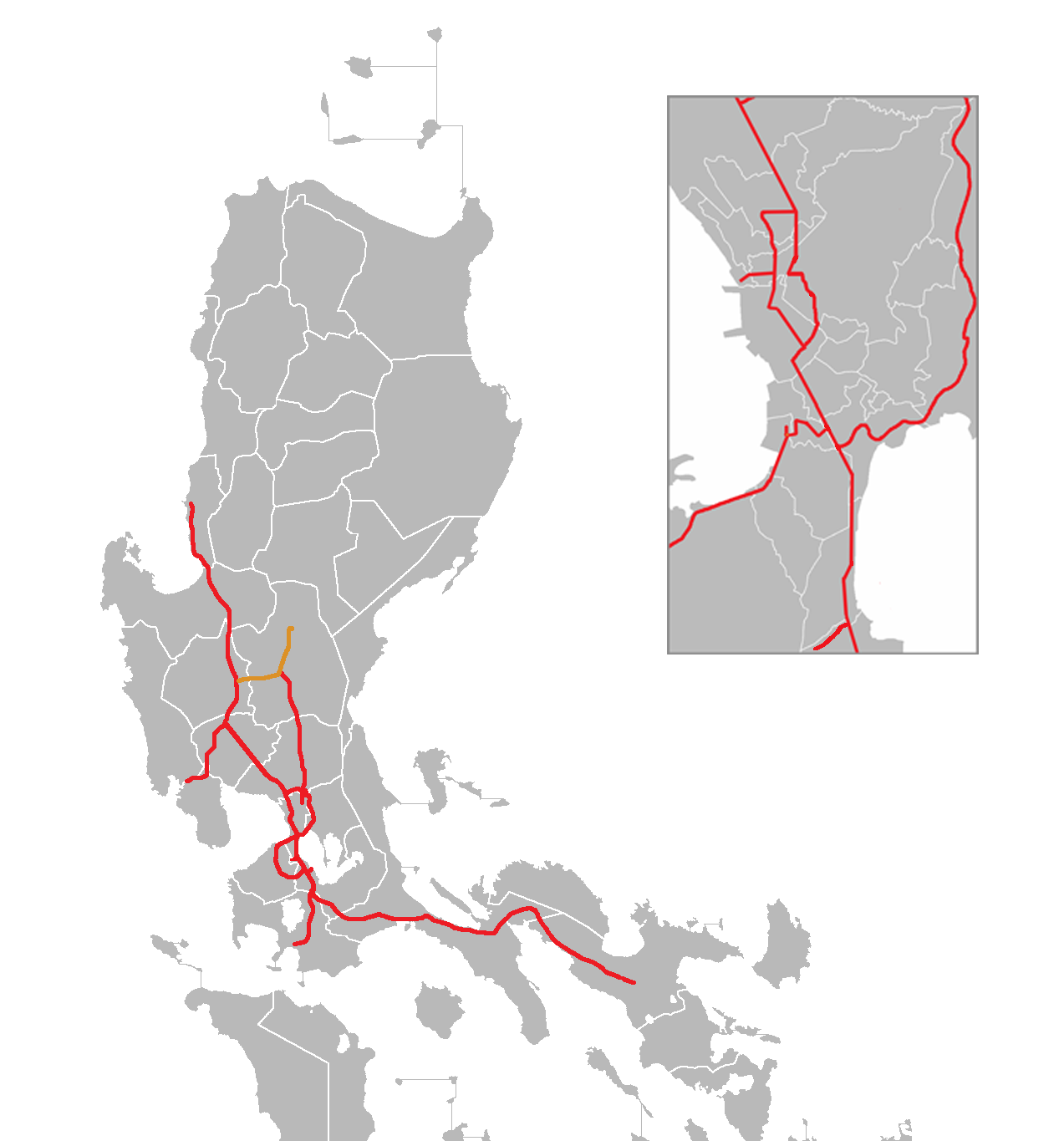
- A map of expressways in Luzon, with CLLEX in orange

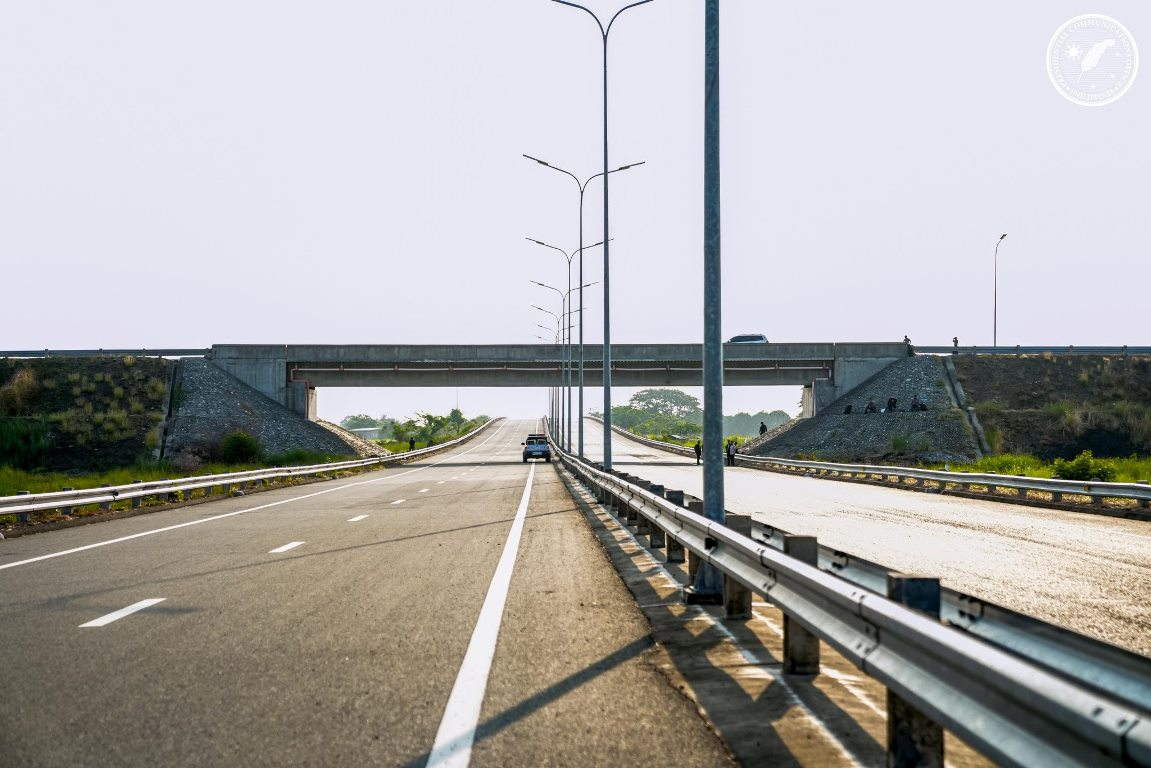
- The expressway at San Juan Interchange, Aliaga, Nueva Ecija

Route information
- Length: 66.4 km (41.3 mi): Phase 1 (Tarlac City to Cabanatuan) – 30.7 km (19.1 mi); Phase 2 (Cabanatuan to San Jose) – 35.70 km (22.18 mi) (under planning)
- Existed: 2021–present
- Component highways: N308 from Tarlac City to La Paz–Zaragoza boundary

Major junctions
- West end: E1 (Subic–Clark–Tarlac Expressway / Tarlac–Pangasinan–La Union Expressway) in Tarlac City
- N58 (Santa Rosa–Tarlac Road) in Tarlac City; AH 26 (N1) (Maharlika Highway) in Cabanatuan; North Luzon East Expressway in Cabanatuan
- East end: AH 26 (N1) (Maharlika Highway) in San Jose

Location
- Country: Philippines
- Provinces: Tarlac; Nueva Ecija
- Major cities: San Jose; Cabanatuan; Tarlac City
- Towns: La Paz; Zaragoza; Aliaga; Talavera; Llanera

Highway system
- Roads in the Philippines; Highways; Expressways; List

The Central Luzon Link Expressway (CLLEX), also known as the Central Luzon Link Freeway, is a partially operational expressway in the Central Luzon region of the Philippines.

It is currently toll-free but will be tolled and opened to other classes of vehicles in the future. The section from Tarlac City to the La Paz–Zaragoza boundary is designated as National Route 308 (N308) of the Philippine highway network.

It connects the Subic–Clark–Tarlac Expressway (SCTEX) and the Tarlac–Pangasinan–La Union Expressway (TPLEX) to the proposed North Luzon East Expressway in Cabanatuan towards San Jose, Nueva Ecija.

== Route description ==
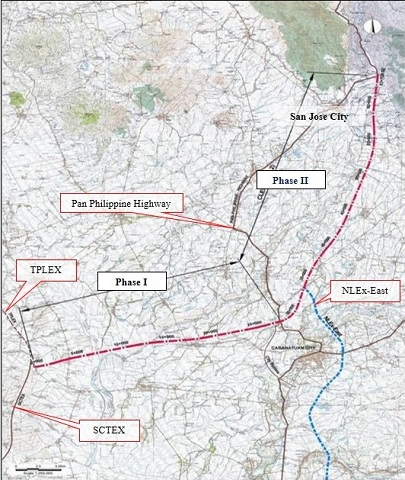
Map of CLLEX

CLLEX runs east-west from Tarlac City to San Jose, Nueva Ecija. The entire route is a four-lane expressway, mostly built on an embankment.

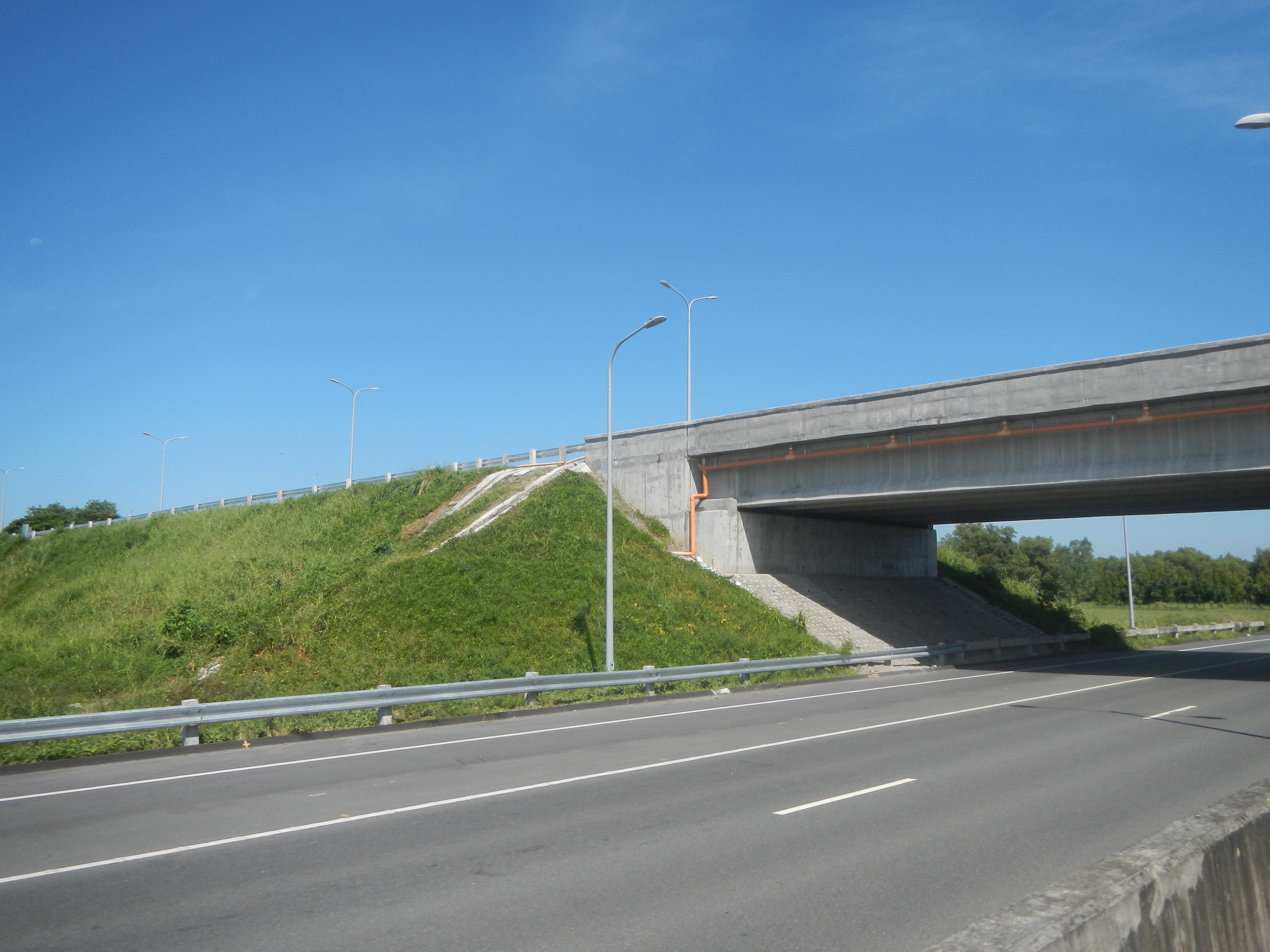
Tarlac City Interchange, the western terminus of CLLEX, as seen from SCTEX

=== Phase 1 ===
From the west, CLLEX begins at a trumpet interchange with the Subic–Clark–Tarlac Expressway (SCTEX) and Tarlac–Pangasinan–La Union Expressway (TPLEX) in Tarlac City. The expressway intersects Santa Rosa–Tarlac Road at a diamond interchange where the expressway passes above grade. The expressway then passes agricultural land before turning east and entering La Paz. It crosses La Paz–Victoria Road, where an interchange serving entering westbound vehicles and exiting eastbound vehicles connects the two. The expressway continues east as it crosses through a viaduct over the Rio Chico River and crosses the Tarlac–Nueva Ecija boundary before crossing the Talavera River.

The expressway then continues east as it enters Zaragoza, Nueva Ecija. It turns northeast as it meets the Zaragoza interchange, a trumpet interchange connecting with Zaragoza–Aliaga Road. It makes a reverse curve, turning southeast before crossing Guimba–Aliaga Road as it enters Aliaga, then San Juan, where the exit is built as the expressway's current terminus.

== History ==
In 2010, the Japan International Cooperation Agency (JICA) formulated the creation of an expressway network under the High Standard Highway Network Development Master Plan, focusing on a growth area within 200 km (120 mi) of Metro Manila. The Department of Public Works and Highways (DPWH), under JICA's assistance, completed the feasibility study for the proposed Central Luzon Expressway (CLEX) the same year.

The proposed project was to divided into two (2) phases: Phase 1 with a 30.7 km (19.1 mi) network beginning from the connection of SCTEX and TPLEX in Balingcanaway, Tarlac City and ends at the Pan-Philippine Highway (Daang Maharlika) in Caalibangbangan, Cabanatuan; and Phase 2 with 35.7 km (22.2 mi) network beginning from the Phase 1 terminus in Cabanatuan and ends at San Jose town proper.

The project was renamed to Central Luzon Link Expressway (CLLEX) in 2011 after the preparatory survey and final report plan for Phase 1 was concluded.

JICA would fund the construction of the 66.4-kilometer (41.3 mi) CLLEX, while operation and maintenance would be under the public-private partnership (PPP) scheme. The construction of the CLLEX Phase 1 project was funded through the Official Development Assistance (Japan) grant of ¥22,796,000,000 (₱11.87 billion, March 2012 exchange rate) at a signing agreement ceremony by the Foreign Affairs Secretary Alberto Romulo and Japanese Ambassador to the Philippines Toshinao Urabe.

In President Benigno Aquino III's State of the Nation address in 2014, the expressway was mentioned as one of the administration's priority projects involving massive infrastructure spending in Central Luzon.

In 2015, Manila North Tollways Corporation (later NLEX Corporation) was interested in a public auction for CLLEX Phase 2 through the PPP scheme. However, the bidding for the project never went through.

The groundbreaking ceremony and the beginning of construction were held on September 22, 2017. The expressway was originally planned to open in December 2020 but was repeatedly delayed due to the COVID-19 pandemic.

The first 18 kilometers (11 mi) of the expressway from Tarlac City to Aliaga was inaugurated by President Rodrigo Duterte on July 15, 2021. The expressway opened to vehicles on the same day.

In July 2022, DPWH announced that CLLEX would be completed by July 2024. The current Phase 1 terminus in Aliaga will see an extension of 7 kilometers (4.3 mi) up to the San Juan Interchange and 4 kilometers (2.5 mi) to Umangan–Julo Road before ending at Felipe Vergara Highway and the Pan–Philippine Highway.

In August 2022, SMEC was appointed a consultant and a transaction advisor. This also provided services for developing the expressway's second phase and the operations and maintenance under PPP.

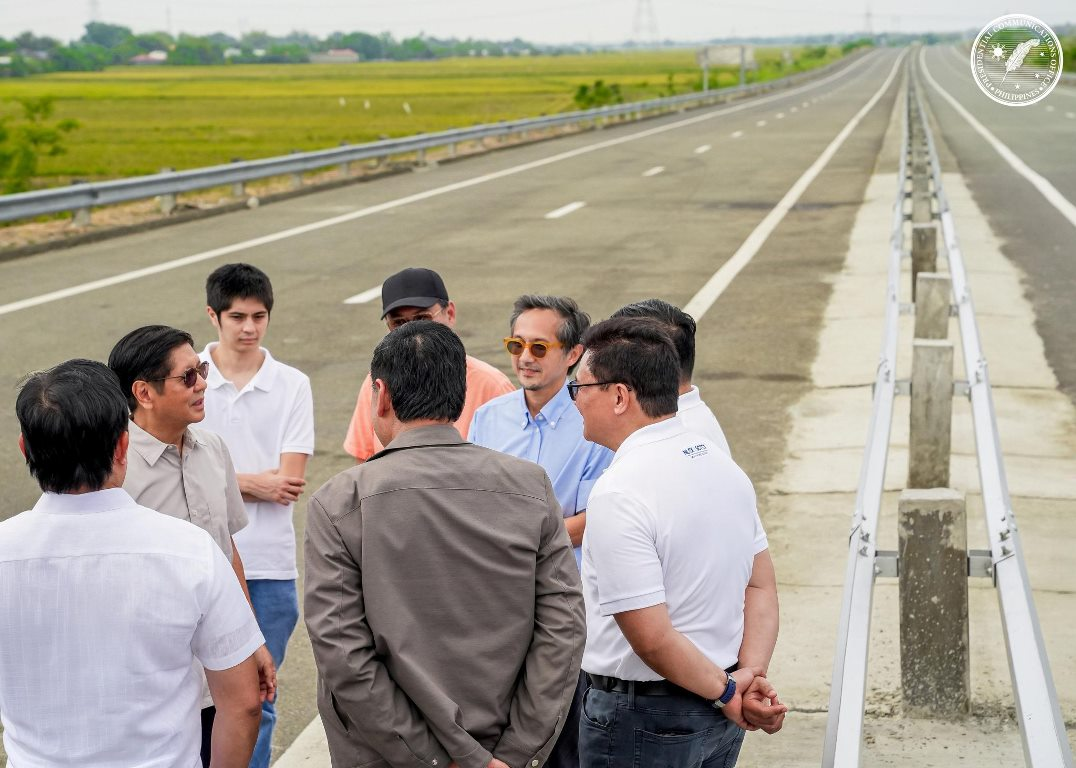
Officials led by President Bongbong Marcos during the opening of CLLEX's Aliaga–Cabanatuan section on March 31, 2026

In April 2024, Hermogenes Ebdane, the Regional Development Council's Sectoral Committee on Infrastructure Development and the Regional Peace and Order Council in Central Luzon, announced that the right of way had been resolved, adding that affected landowners who established barricades along the route had dismantled them.

The final leg of the expressway to Cabanatuan was officially opened by President Bongbong Marcos on March 31, 2026. According to DPWH Secretary Vince Dizon, a PPP will oversee expressway operations.

== Exits ==
This entire route is located in Central Luzon. Exits will be numbered by kilometer posts, with Rizal Park in Manila designated as kilometer zero.

Province	City/Municipality	km	mi	Exit	Name	Destinations	Notes
Tarlac	Tarlac City			122	Tarlac City	E1 (Subic–Clark–Tarlac Expressway, Tarlac–Pangasinan–La Union Expressway) / N58 (Santa Rosa–Tarlac Road) – Clark, Manila, Subic	Hybrid trumpet and diamond interchange; western terminus
Tarlac	La Paz			Tarlac toll plaza			
Tarlac	La Paz			Rio Chico Bridge over the Chico River			
Tarlac–Nueva Ecija boundary	La Paz–Zaragoza boundary			Change from N308 to unnumbered			
Nueva Ecija	Zaragoza				Zaragoza	Zaragoza Access Road	Future trumpet interchange
Nueva Ecija	Aliaga				Aliaga	Guimba–Aliaga Road	Former half-diamond interchange, former eastern terminus (2021–2024)
Nueva Ecija	Aliaga			102	Aliaga	Guimba–Aliaga Road	Trumpet interchange
Nueva Ecija	Aliaga				San Juan	Carmen–Cabanatuan Road	Half trumpet interchange; former eastern terminus (2024–2026)
Nueva Ecija	Cabanatuan				Cabanatuan	AH 26 (N1) (Felipe Vergara Highway) – Cagayan Valley, Aurora	Half-diamond interchange; current eastern terminus
Nueva Ecija	Cabanatuan				Cabanatuan	Felipe Vergara Highway	Future trumpet interchange; eastern end of Phase 1
Nueva Ecija	Cabanatuan				NLEE	North Luzon East Expressway	
Nueva Ecija	Llanera				Llanera		Trumpet interchange
Nueva Ecija	San Jose			Talavera Bridge over the Talavera River			
Nueva Ecija	San Jose			San Jose toll plaza			
Nueva Ecija	San Jose				San Jose	AH 26 (N1) (Maharlika Highway) – Cagayan Valley	Future eastern terminus; end of Phase 2
1.000 mi = 1.609 km; 1.000 km = 0.621 mi: Closed/former; Incomplete access; Route transition; Unopened
