= Urdaneta–Dagupan Road =

Primary road in the Philippines

Urdaneta–Dagupan Road
- Urdaneta Junction–Calasiao–Dagupan Road; Urdaneta Junction–Dagupan Road
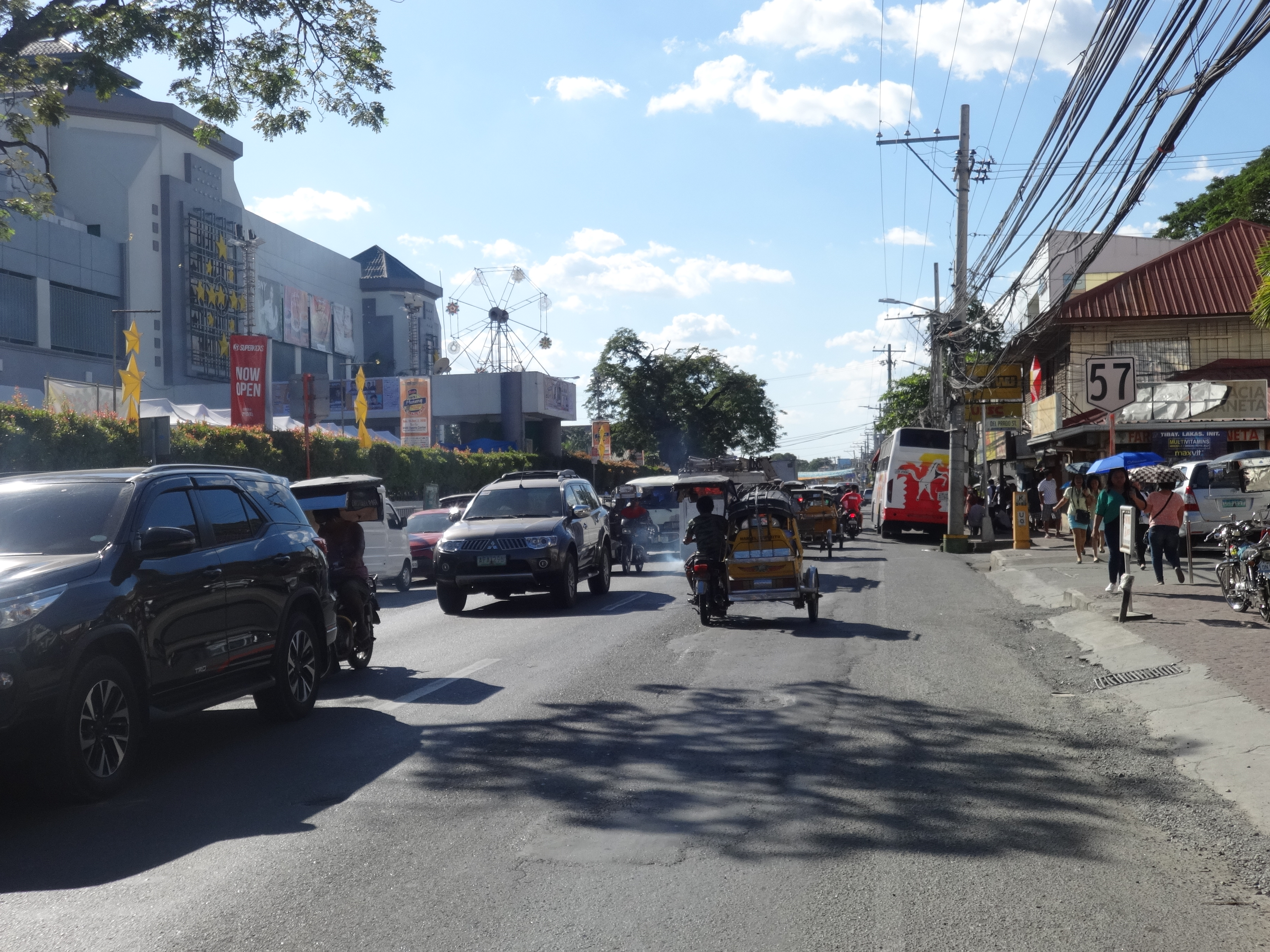
- The highway in Urdaneta with a reassurance marker

Route information
- Maintained by Department of Public Works and Highways
- Length: 28.02 km (17.41 mi)
- Component highways: N57

Major junctions
- East end: N2 (Manila North Road) / Asingan–Urdaneta Road in Urdaneta
- N245 (Ambassador Eduardo “Danding” M. Cojuangco Jr. Avenue) in Urdaneta; N242 (Santa Barbara Old Road) in Santa Barbara; N242 (Santa Barbara–Mangaldan Road) in Santa Barbara; N241 (Calasiao Old Road) in Santa Barbara; N241 (Calasiao–Dagupan Road) in Santa Barbara
- West end: N55 (Urdaneta–Lingayen Road) in Dagupan

Location
- Country: Philippines
- Provinces: Pangasinan
- Major cities: Urdaneta, Dagupan
- Towns: Santa Barbara, Calasiao

Highway system
- Roads in the Philippines; Highways; Expressways; List
← N56	→ N58

Urdaneta–Dagupan Road, also known as Urdaneta Junction–Dagupan Road and Urdaneta Junction–Calasiao–Dagupan Road, is a 28.02-kilometer (17.41 mi) major primary road in the province of Pangasinan. It traverses and connects through the municipalities of Santa Barbara, and Calasiao, and the cities of Urdaneta and Dagupan. The highway's segment from Urdaneta to Calasiao is also legally designated as part of the MacArthur Highway, while its segment from Calasiao to Dagupan is known as Judge Jose de Venecia Sr. Avenue. The entire highway is signed as National Route 57 (N57) of the Philippine highway network.

== Route description ==
The highway serves as a major thoroughfare when going to the town of Calasiao and the city of Dagupan and the town of Santa Barbara, or city of Urdaneta and vice versa.

=== Urdaneta to Calasiao ===
The highway legally known as MacArthur Highway starts at the junction with MacArthur Highway/Manila North Road and Asingan–Urdaneta Road (locally known as Manuel Roxas Street) in the city proper of Urdaneta. There, it is locally known as Amadeo R. Perez Jr. Avenue and Calle Perez, respectively. The road continues westward, traversing the municipalities of Santa Barbara and Calasiao while bypassing their respective poblaciones. It reaches the intersection with the Calasiao–Dagupan Road in Calasiao, where the MacArthur Highway name shifts to that road northward to Dagupan city proper.

=== Calasiao to Dagupan ===
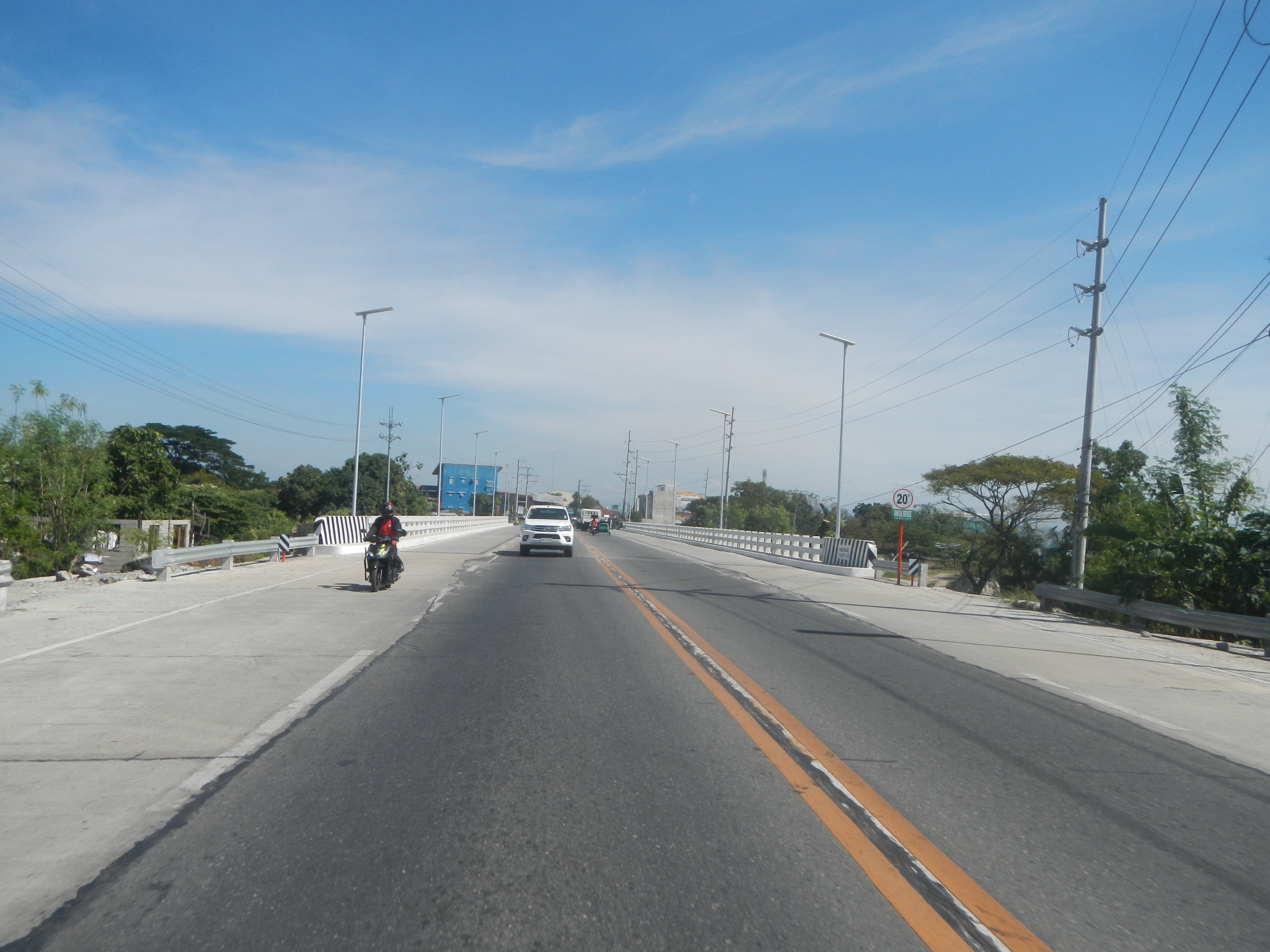
The highway as Judge Jose de Venecia Sr. Avenue in Calasiao

Past the Calasiao–Dagupan Road, the highway then proceeds as Judge Jose de Venecia Sr. Avenue. It then veers north before reaching its terminus at the Urdaneta–Lingayen Road (Urdaneta–Dagupan Road) in Dagupan.

== History ==
The highway traces its roots to the old road from Urdaneta to Calasiao. New alignments were eventually developed to bypass the poblaciones of Santa Barbara and Calasiao and to extend outward toward Dagupan to form the present-day highway.

On June 17, 1961, the section of the road from Urdaneta to Calasiao was renamed MacArthur Highway in honor of the Liberator of the Philippines during World War II, General Douglas MacArthur.
