= Santa Rosa–Tarlac Road =

Highway in the Philippines

Santa Rosa–Tarlac Road
- Tarlac–Santa Rosa Road
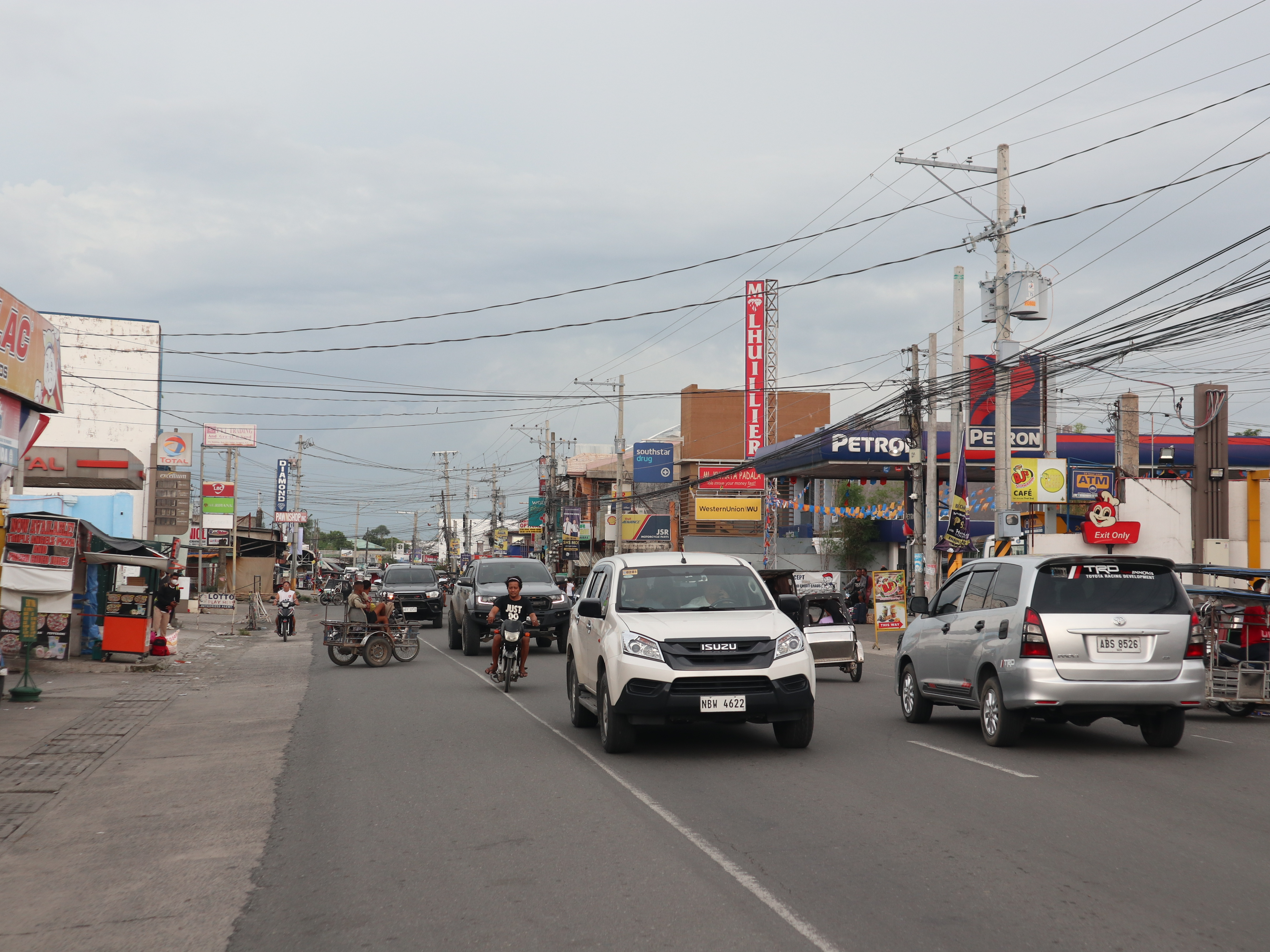
- The road in Zaragoza, Nueva Ecija

Route information
- Maintained by Department of Public Works and Highways
- Length: 39 km (24 mi)
- Component highways: N58

Major junctions
- From: AH 26 (N1) (Maharlika Highway) / Santa Rosa–Fort Magsaysay Road in Santa Rosa
- E1 (Subic-Clark-Tarlac Expressway / Tarlac–Pangasinan–La Union Expressway) in Tarlac City; N308 (Central Luzon Link Expressway) in Tarlac City
- To: N2 (MacArthur Highway) / Juan Luna Street in Tarlac City

Location
- Country: Philippines
- Provinces: Nueva Ecija, Tarlac
- Major cities: Tarlac
- Towns: Santa Rosa, Zaragoza, La Paz

Highway system
- Roads in the Philippines; Highways; Expressways; List
← N57	→ N59

Santa Rosa–Tarlac Road, signed as National Route 58 (N58) of the Philippine highway network, is a 39 kilometers (24 miles) major primary road in the provinces of Nueva Ecija and Tarlac. It traverses and connects through the municipalities of Santa Rosa, Zaragoza, La Paz and the city of Tarlac.

== History ==
The road was designated as N58 during the assignment of routes. In 2022, the DPWH approved a contract that would connect Santa Rosa-Tarlac Road to the Subic–Clark–Tarlac Expressway at Luisita Access Road via a diversion road. In 2026, planning began to improve drainage systems along the route.

== Route description ==
The road serves as a major highway when going to La Paz or Zaragoza and Tarlac from Santa Rosa and vice versa.

=== Santa Rosa to Zaragoza ===
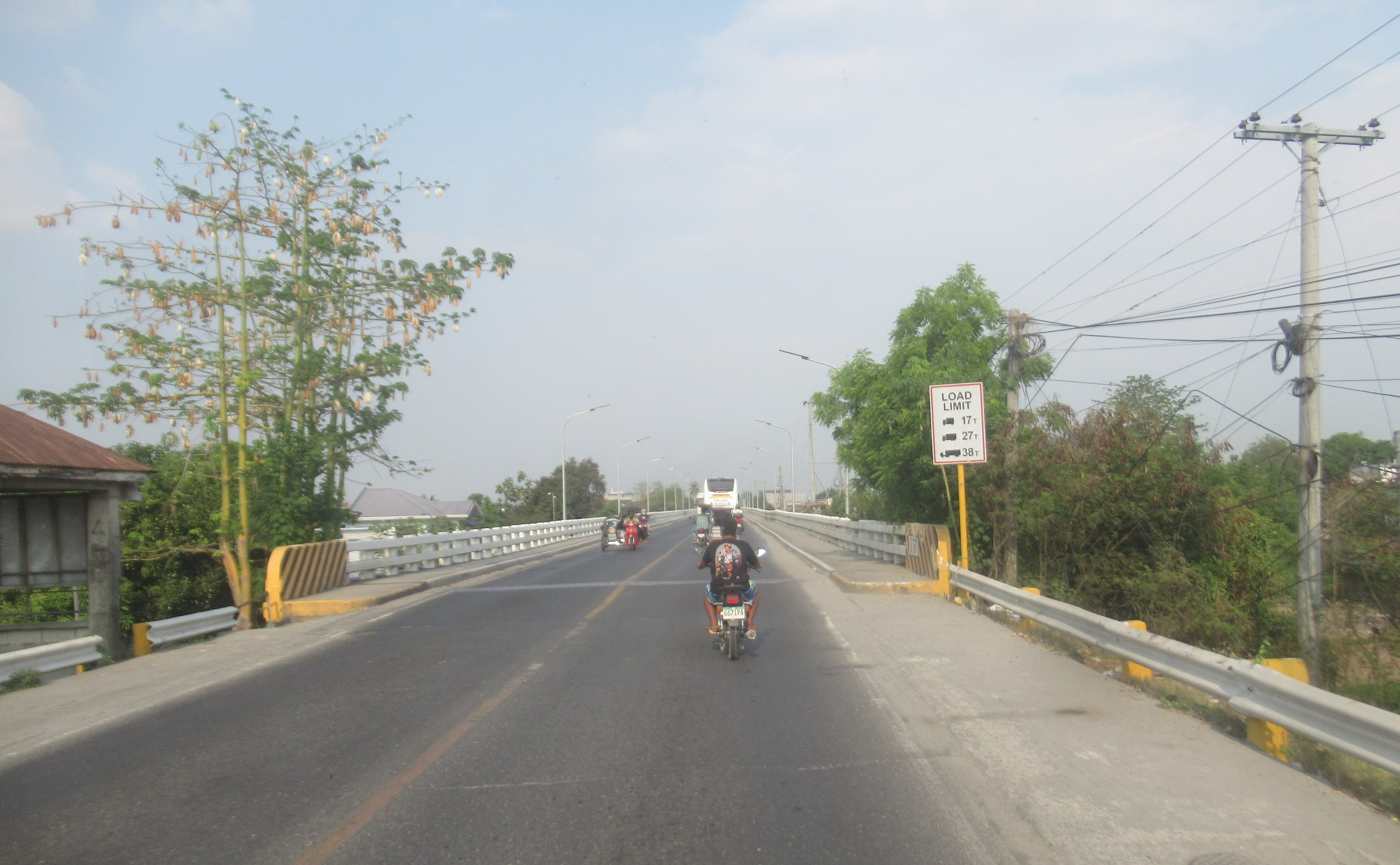
Santa Rosa Bridge carries the road over the Pampanga River in Santa Rosa, Nueva Ecija

The road starts at the junction with Daang Maharlika (N1/AH26) and Santa Rosa–Fort Magsaysay Road in Santa Rosa, Nueva Ecija. The road continues west and passes to the municipality of Zaragoza, Nueva Ecija.

=== La Paz to Tarlac City ===
The road is named as Tarlac–Santa Rosa Road and it reaches La Paz and the province of Tarlac. It reaches the city of Tarlac and makes a junction on Subic-Clark-Tarlac Expressway Tarlac–Pangasinan–La Union Expressway, and Central Luzon Link Expressway (CLLEX). The road meets its western terminus at its intersection with MacArthur Highway (N2) and the unnumbered Juan Luna Street in Tarlac City.

== Intersections ==
Intersections are numbered by kilometer posts, with Rizal Park designated as kilometer 0.

Province	City/Municipality	km	mi	Destinations	Notes
Nueva Ecija	Santa Rosa			AH 26 (N1) (Maharlika Highway)	Four-way intersection, eastern terminus. Continues west as Santa Rosa–Fort Magsaysay Road.
Tarlac	Tarlac			E1 (Subic–Clark–Tarlac Expressway / Tarlac–Pangasinan–La Union Expressway)	
Tarlac	Tarlac			N308 (Central Luzon Link Expressway) – La Union, Aliaga	
Tarlac	Tarlac			E1 (Tarlac–Pangasinan–La Union Expressway)	
Tarlac	Tarlac			N2 (MacArthur Highway)	Western terminus. Continues west as Juan Luna Street.
1.000 mi = 1.609 km; 1.000 km = 0.621 mi
