= Radial Road 9 =

Road in Manila, Philippines

R-9 Radial Road 9
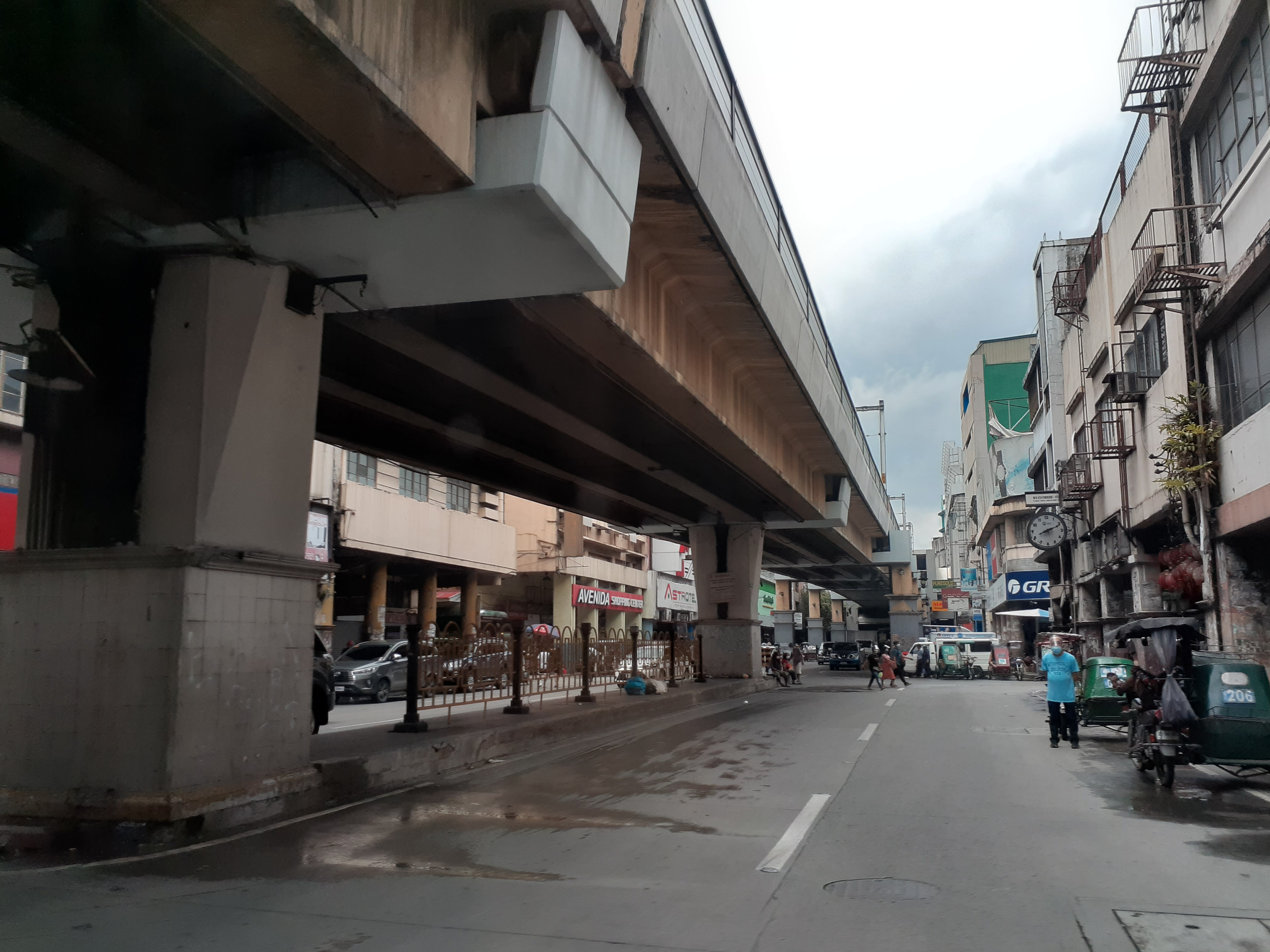
- Rizal Avenue as seen from Gonzalo Puyat Street intersection, part of the R-9 Road

Route information
- Length: 228.0 km (141.7 mi)
- Component highways: N150 in Manila and Caloocan; N1 from Caloocan to Guiguinto; N2 from Guiguinto to Rosario

Major junctions
- South end: Pasig River in the City of Manila
- North end: N54 (Kennon Road) in Rosario, La Union

Location
- Country: Philippines

Highway system
- Roads in the Philippines; Highways; Expressways; List

Radial Road 9 (R-9), informally known as the R-9 Road, is a network of roads and bridges which comprise the ninth arterial road of Metro Manila in the Philippines. It is the westernmost of the radial roads north of the Pasig River that lead to the provinces. The road links the city of Manila with Caloocan, Malabon and Valenzuela in the north, leading out of Metro Manila into the provinces of Bulacan, Pampanga, Tarlac, Pangasinan, and La Union.

== Route description ==
=== Rizal Avenue ===
Between the Pasig River front of the district of Santa Cruz and the Monumento Roundabout at the intersection with Epifanio de los Santos Avenue (EDSA) in Caloocan, R-9 is known as Rizal Avenue. It runs underneath the LRT Line 1.

=== MacArthur Highway ===
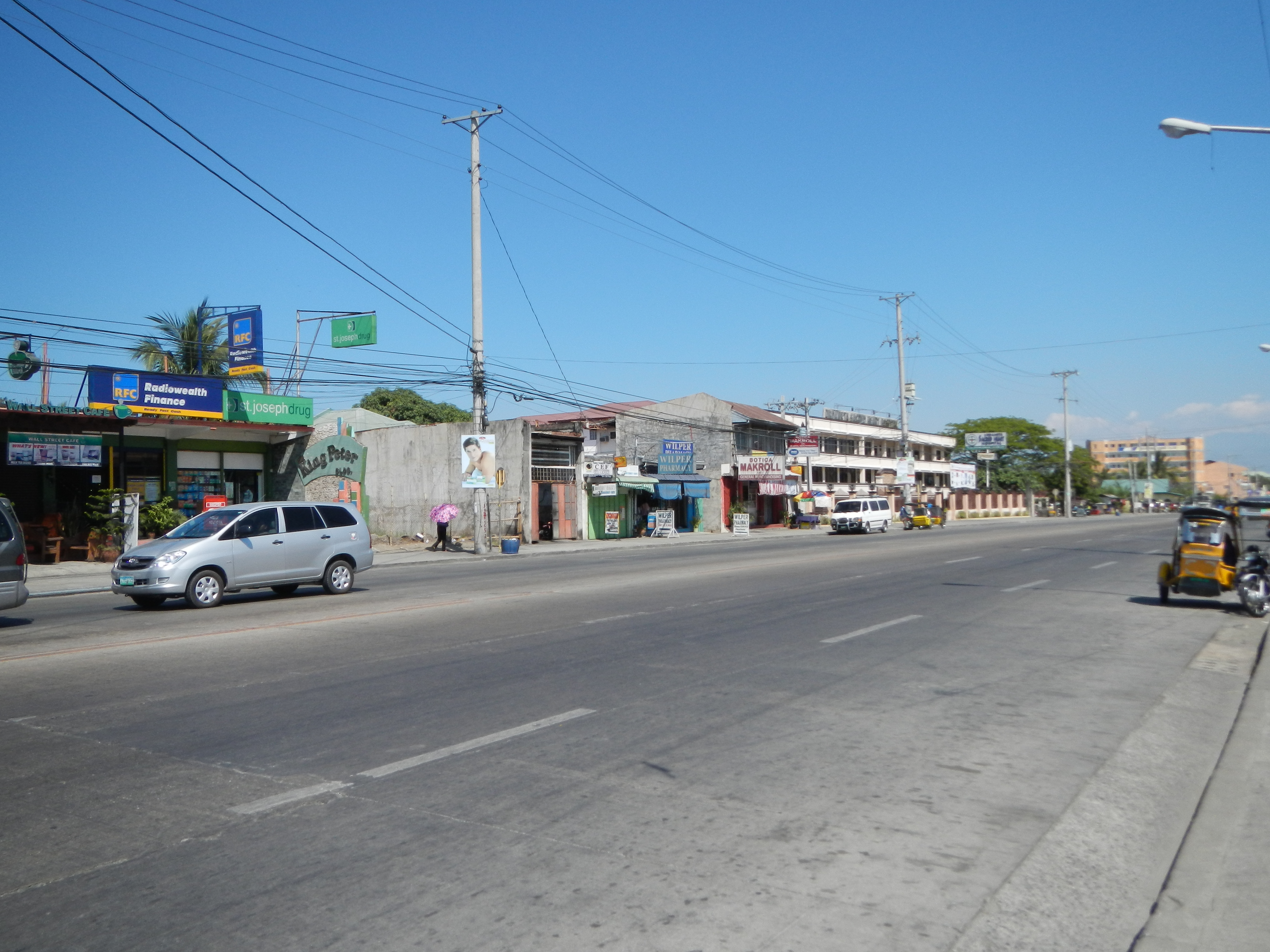
MacArthur Highway in Urdaneta City, Pangasinan

R-9 becomes the MacArthur Highway after crossing the intersection of EDSA and Samson Road at the Monumento Roundabout. It connects South Caloocan with Malabon and Valenzuela, running parallel to the North Luzon Expressway (R-8) to the east. The highway crosses into the Central Luzon provinces of Bulacan, Pampanga, Tarlac, Pangasinan, and La Union, where it is also known as the Manila North Road. The R-9 segment of the road terminates at the junction with Kennon Road in Rosario.

== See also ==
- List of roads in Metro Manila
