= MacArthur Highway =

National highway in Luzon, Philippines

Coordinates: 15°33′09″N 120°20′43″E

R-9 MacArthur Highway
- Manila North Road
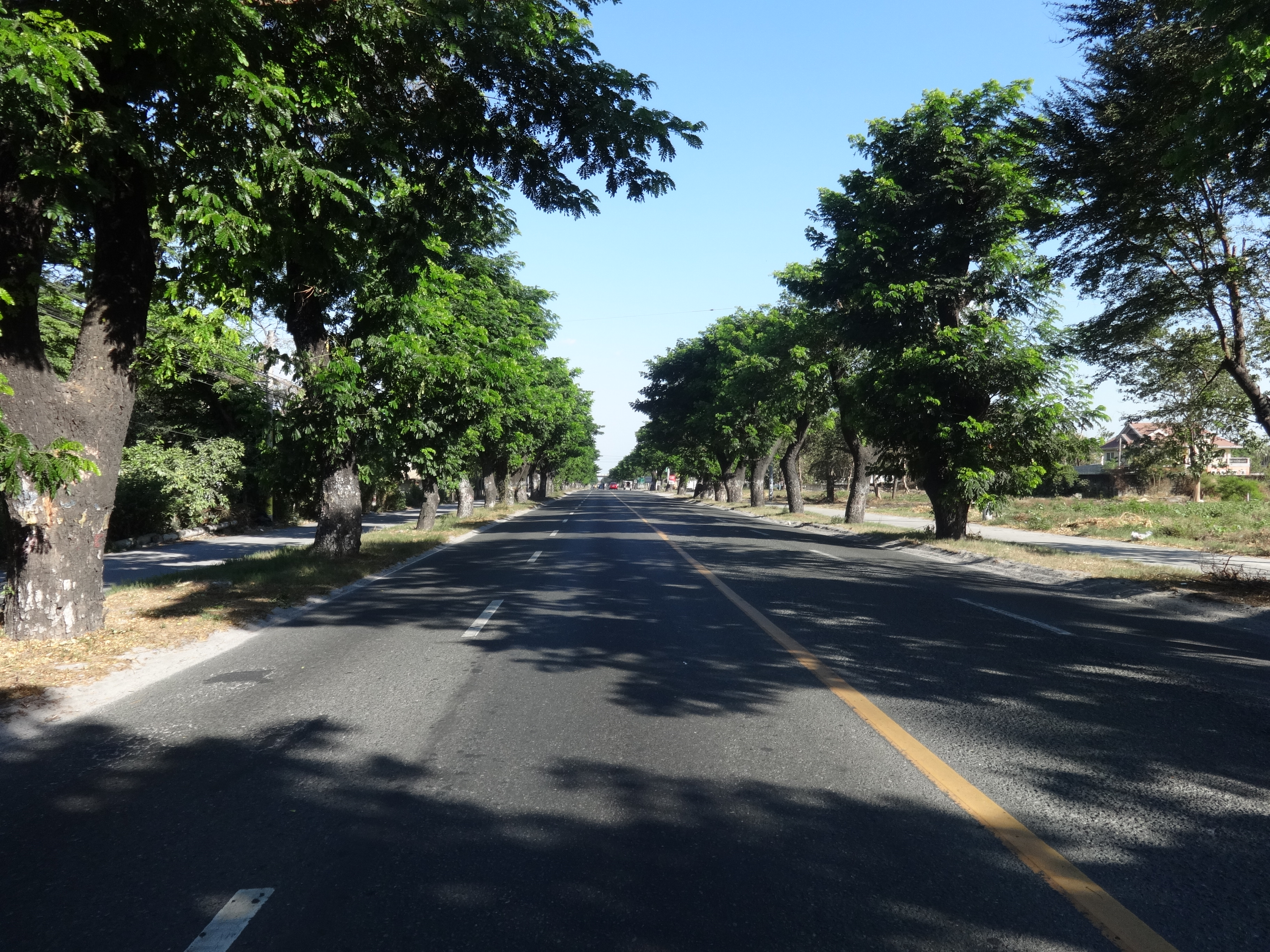
- MacArthur Highway in San Fernando, Pampanga

Route information
- Maintained by the Department of Public Works and Highways
- Length: 684.855 km (425.549 mi)
- Component highways: R-9 R-9 in Metro Manila; N1 from Caloocan to Guiguinto and in Laoag; N2 from Guiguinto to Laoag; AH26 from Laoag to Aparri

Major junctions
- South end: AH26 (Bonifacio Monument Circle) in Caloocan
- E5 (NLEX Harbor Link) in Valenzuela; E1 (Tabang Spur Road) / N1 (Maharlika Highway) in Guiguinto; N3 (Jose Abad Santos Avenue) in San Fernando, Pampanga; N217 (Santo Rosario Street & Jake Gonzales Boulevard) in Angeles City; E1 (Subic–Clark–Tarlac Expressway) in Mabalacat; N55 (P. Zamora Avenue) in Tarlac City; N58 (Santa Rosa–Tarlac Road) in Tarlac City; N56 (Carmen–Rosales Road) / N212 (Carmen–Alcala Road) in Rosales; N57 (Urdaneta–Dagupan Road) in Urdaneta; N54 (Kennon Road) in Rosario, La Union; E1 (Tarlac–Pangasinan–La Union Expressway) / N209 (Pugo–Rosario Road) in Rosario; N208 (Aspiras–Palispis Highway) in Agoo; N54 (Naguilian Road) in Bauang; N205 (Tagudin–Cervantes–Sabangan Road) in Tagudin; N204 (Ilocos Sur-Abra Road) in Narvacan; AH26 (Bangag-Magapit Road) in Aparri
- North end: Barangay Mabanguc, Aparri, Cagayan

Location
- Country: Philippines
- Regions: Cagayan Valley; Central Luzon; Ilocos Region; Metro Manila
- Provinces: Bulacan; Pampanga; Tarlac; Pangasinan; La Union; Ilocos Sur; Ilocos Norte; Cagayan
- Major cities: Angeles City; Batac; Caloocan; Candon; Laoag; Mabalacat; Malabon; Malolos; Meycauayan; San Fernando (La Union); San Fernando (Pampanga); Tarlac City; Urdaneta; Valenzuela
- Towns: Abulug; Agoo; Apalit; Aparri; Aringay; Bacarra; Bacnotan; Badoc; Balagtas; Balaoan; Ballesteros; Bamban; Bangar; Bangui; Bantay; Bauang; Binalonan; Bocaue; Burgos; Caba; Cabugao; Calumpit; Capas; Claveria; Currimao; Gerona; Guiguinto; Luna; Magsingal; Marilao; Minalin; Moncada; Narvacan; Pagudpud; Pamplona; Paniqui; Pasuquin; Pinili; Pozorrubio; Rosales; Rosario; San Esteban; San Ildefonso; San Juan (Ilocos Sur); San Juan (La Union); San Manuel; Sanchez-Mira; San Nicolas; San Simon; Santa; Santa Cruz; Santa Lucia; Santa Maria; Santa Praxedes; Santiago; Santo Domingo; Santo Tomas (La Union); Santo Tomas (Pampanga); Sinait; Sison; Sudipen; Tagudin; Villasis

Highway system
- Roads in the Philippines; Highways; Expressways; List

The MacArthur Highway, officially the Manila North Road (MNR or MaNor), is a 685-kilometer (426 mi), two-to-six lane, national primary highway and tertiary highway in Luzon, Philippines, connecting Caloocan in Metro Manila to Aparri in Cagayan at the north. It is the second longest road in the Philippines, after the Pan-Philippine Highway. It is primarily known as MacArthur Highway in segments from Caloocan to Urdaneta, Pangasinan, although it is also applied up to Ilocos Sur and called Manila North Road for the entire length. It was named after the top American general commander during World War II and the Korean War, Douglas MacArthur.

== Route description ==
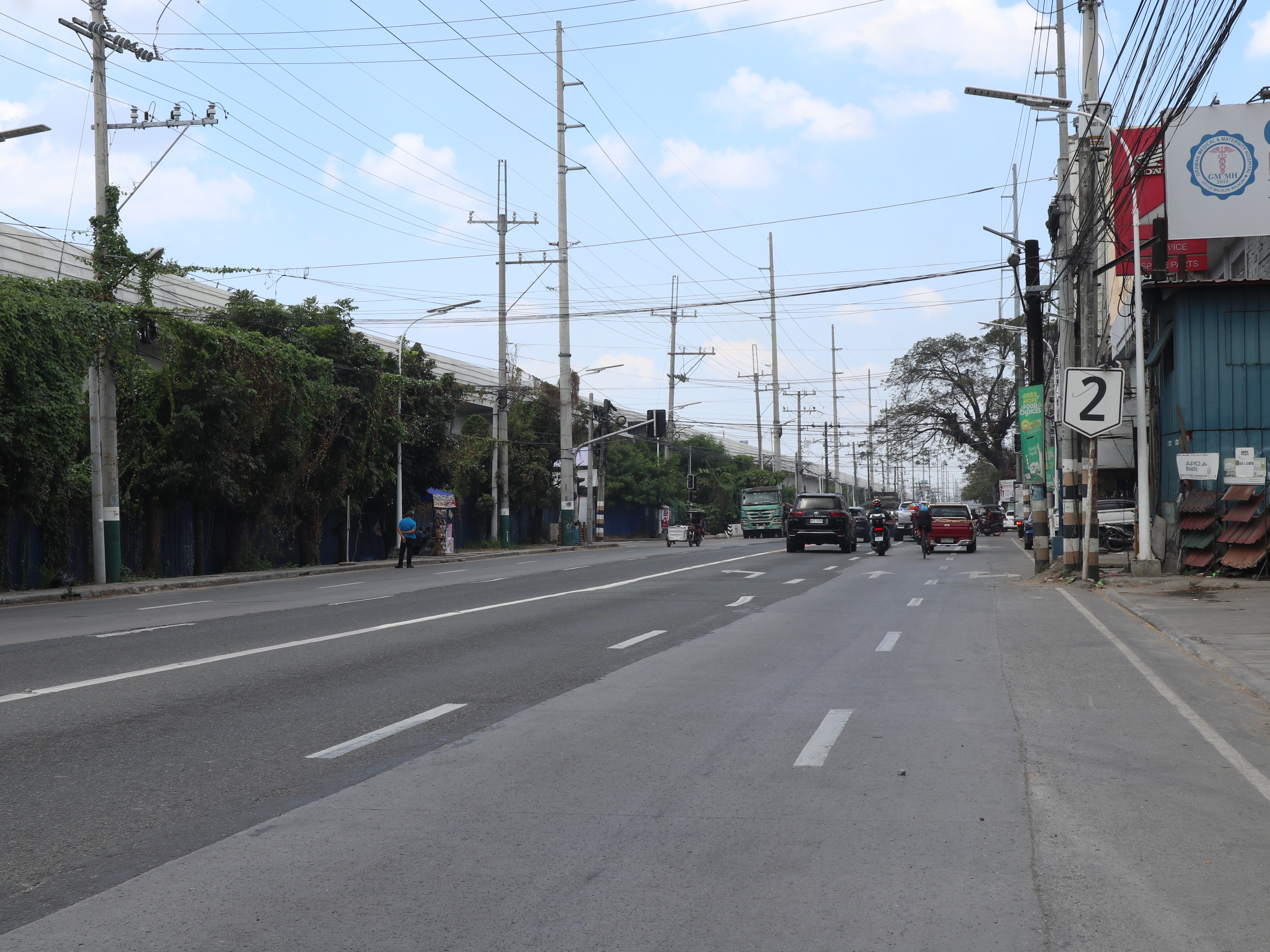
The highway with the N2 reassurance marker in Malolos, Bulacan

Manila North Road is a toll-free, two- to eight-lane national road that stretches for 684.855 kilometers (425.549 mi) from the Bonifacio Monument (Monumento) Circle in Caloocan, north of Manila, to the northern province of Cagayan, passing through three cities in Metro Manila (Caloocan, Malabon, and Valenzuela), three provinces of Central Luzon (Bulacan, Pampanga and Tarlac), four provinces of the Ilocos Region (Pangasinan, La Union, Ilocos Sur, and Ilocos Norte), and the province of Cagayan in the Cagayan Valley region. The highway parallels the North Luzon Expressway from Epifanio de los Santos Avenue (EDSA) to Mabalacat, the Subic–Clark–Tarlac Expressway from Mabalacat to Tarlac City, and the Tarlac–Pangasinan–La Union Expressway from Tarlac City to Rosario.

The entire road consists of a series of route numbering systems by the Department of Public Works and Highways. From Caloocan to Guiguinto and from Laoag to Aparri, it is the component of National Route 1 (N1) of the Philippine highway network, although N1 is not signposted in the first part of the highway; the latter's section between the Ilocos Norte Provincial Capitol and Aparri is also part of the Pan-Philippine Highway or Asian Highway 26 (AH26) of the Asian highway network. The rest of the route from Guiguinto to Laoag is entirely designated as the National Route 2 (N2) of the Philippine highway network. Particularly its section in Metro Manila, it is also a component of R-9 of Manila's arterial road network. Its remaining section in Aparri is classified as an unnumbered, tertiary road.

=== Alternative names ===
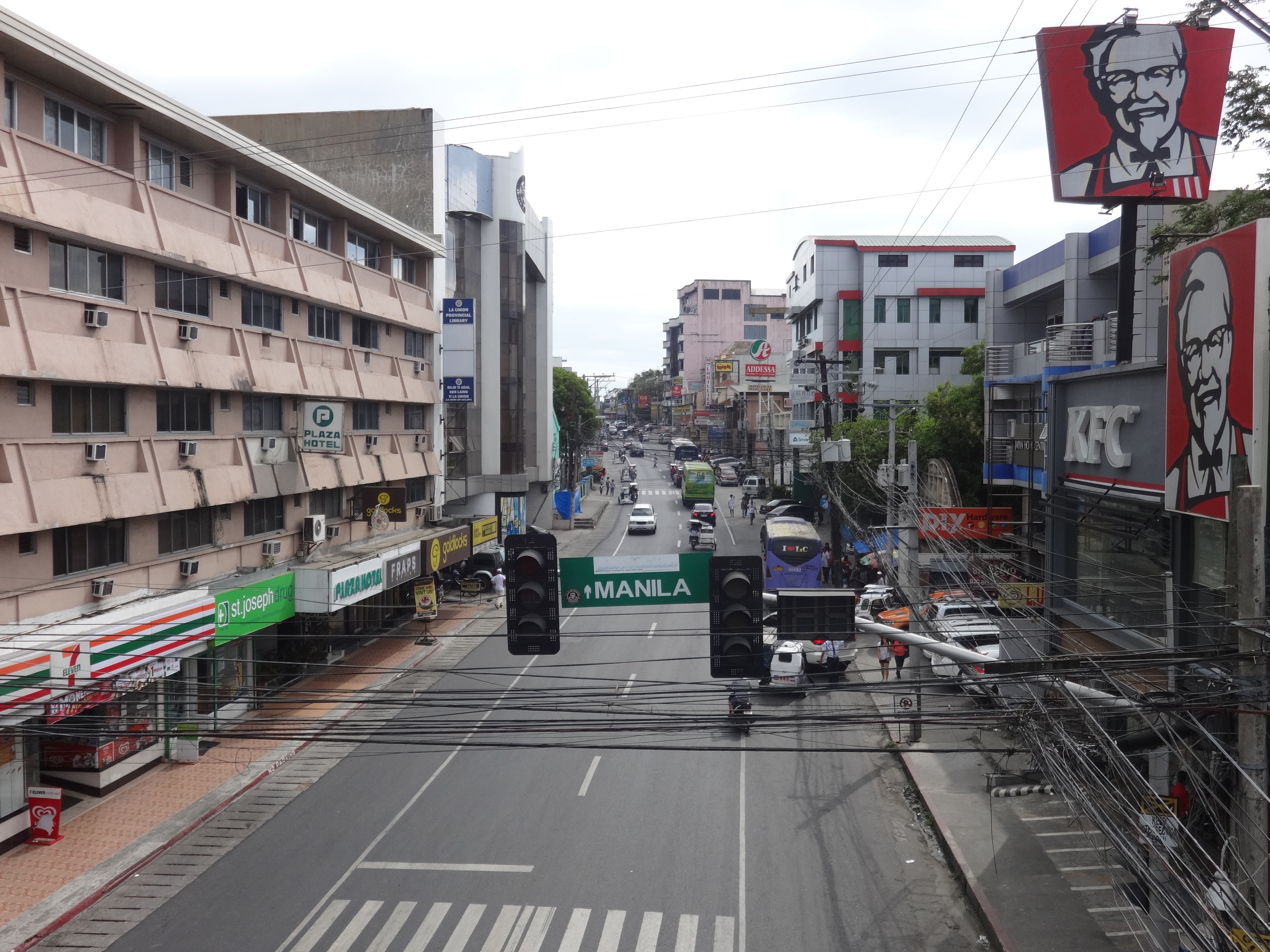
The highway in San Fernando, La Union, locally known as Quezon Avenue

Manila North Road's section from Caloocan to Urdaneta, Pangasinan is officially recognized as MacArthur Highway, although it is also known as such in La Union and Ilocos Sur. Its section that forms part of N1/AH26 from Laoag to Aparri is also known as Maharlika Highway and part of Laoag–Allacapan Road.

Through the city proper of San Fernando, La Union, the road is locally known as Quezon Avenue. In Laoag, it forms part of Laoag–Paoay Road between Laoag Airport Road and at the city proper, it is locally known as J.P. Rizal Avenue and Gen. Segundo Avenue, respectively.

== History ==
The highway was built in sections beginning in 1928 during the American colonial period. It followed much of the route of the old Manila Railroad line from Manila to Dagupan. It was designated Highway 3 or Route 3 in early U.S. military records. It also reached south up to Manila through the present-day alignment of Rizal Avenue (Route 3A); the highway's section from Caloocan to Valenzuela (formerly Polo) was once part of Rizal Avenue Extension. However, Highway 3 had different alignments: in Valenzuela, it used a route still existing today in barangay Malanday; in Bulacan, it went along the Maharlika Highway and Pulilan Regional Road from Guiguinto to Calumpit via Pulilan; in San Fernando and Angeles, Pampanga, it is known as the Old Manila North Road; and in Paniqui, Tarlac, it followed Paniqui Poblacion Road. New alignments were eventually developed, forming the present-day Manila North Road, which, by the 1950s, extended to Aparri in Cagayan, incorporating the former Cagayan–Ilocos Norte Road.

On June 17, 1961, the section of the Manila North Road from Caloocan to Urdaneta, aalongside the sections of the present-day Urdaneta–Dagupan Road and Calasiao–Dagupan Road, was renamed MacArthur Highway in honor of the Liberator of the Philippines during World War II, General Douglas MacArthur.

In 1991, the highway was affected by the eruption of Mount Pinatubo, with the collapse of the Bamban Bridge, which carried it over the Sacobia River at the Tarlac–Pampanga provincial boundary, effectively disconnecting it. It was subsequently rehabilitated after the eruption, with the construction of the new Bamban Bridge from 1996 to 1998.

== Intersections ==
=== Metro Manila ===
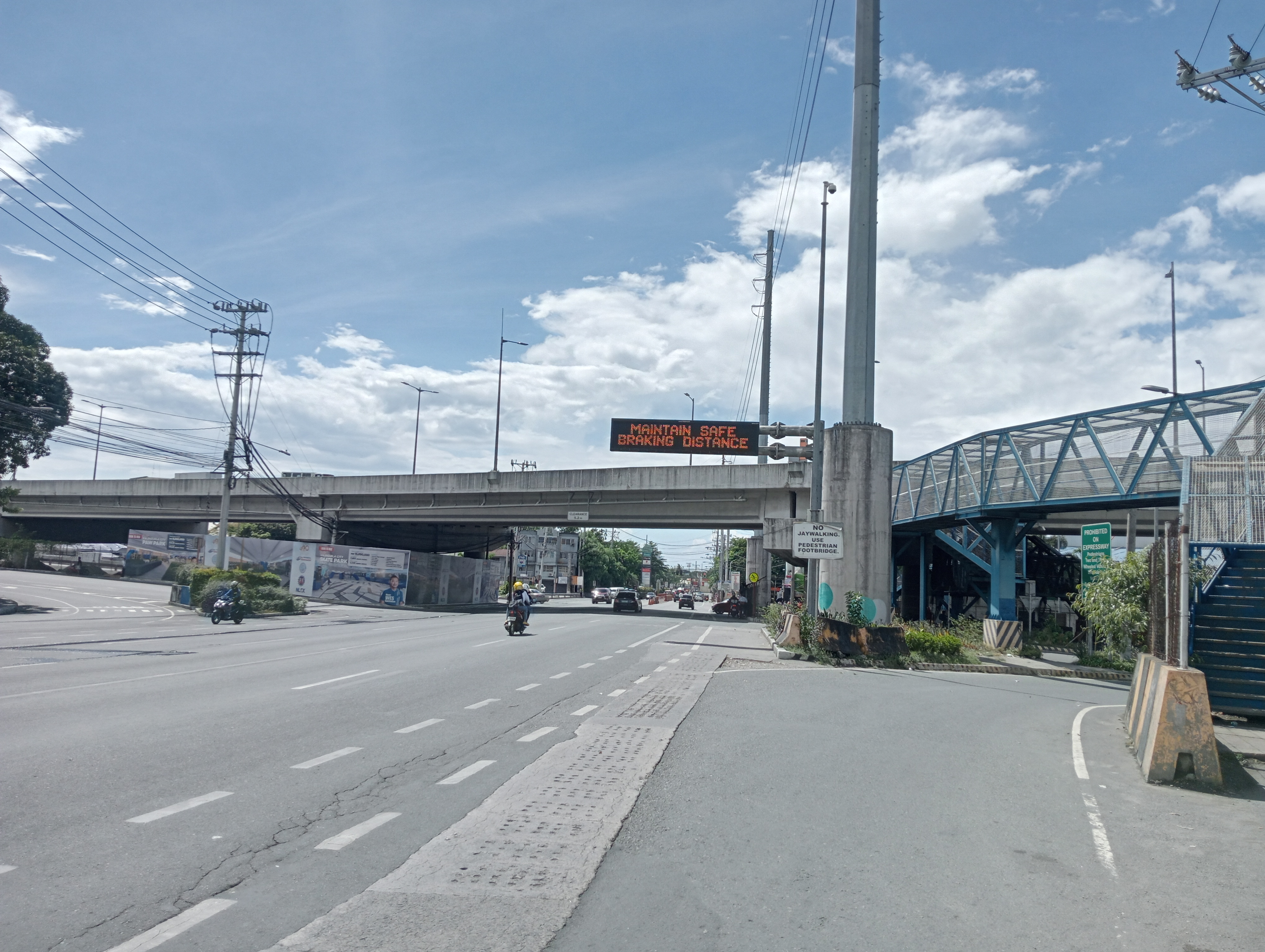
Karuhatan Interchange in Valenzuela, where the highway intersects with NLEX Harbor Link

- AH26 (EDSA) / AH26 (Samson Road) / N150 (Rizal Avenue Extension) in Caloocan. Southern terminus of the highway.
- E5 (NLEX Harbor Link) in Karuhatan, Valenzuela
- N118 (Maysan Road) in Malinta, Valenzuela

=== Bulacan ===
- N117 in Meycauayan
- E1 (Tabang Spur Road) / N1 in Tabang, Guiguinto. Transition from N1 to N2. Southern terminus of N2.
- N115 in Calumpit

=== Pampanga ===
- N3 in San Fernando
- N216 in Angeles
- N217 in Angeles (two northern termini)
- N215 in Angeles
- E1 (Clark Spur Road) in Mabiga, Mabalacat
- N213 in Mabalacat
- E1 (SCTEX) in Dolores, Mabalacat

=== Tarlac ===
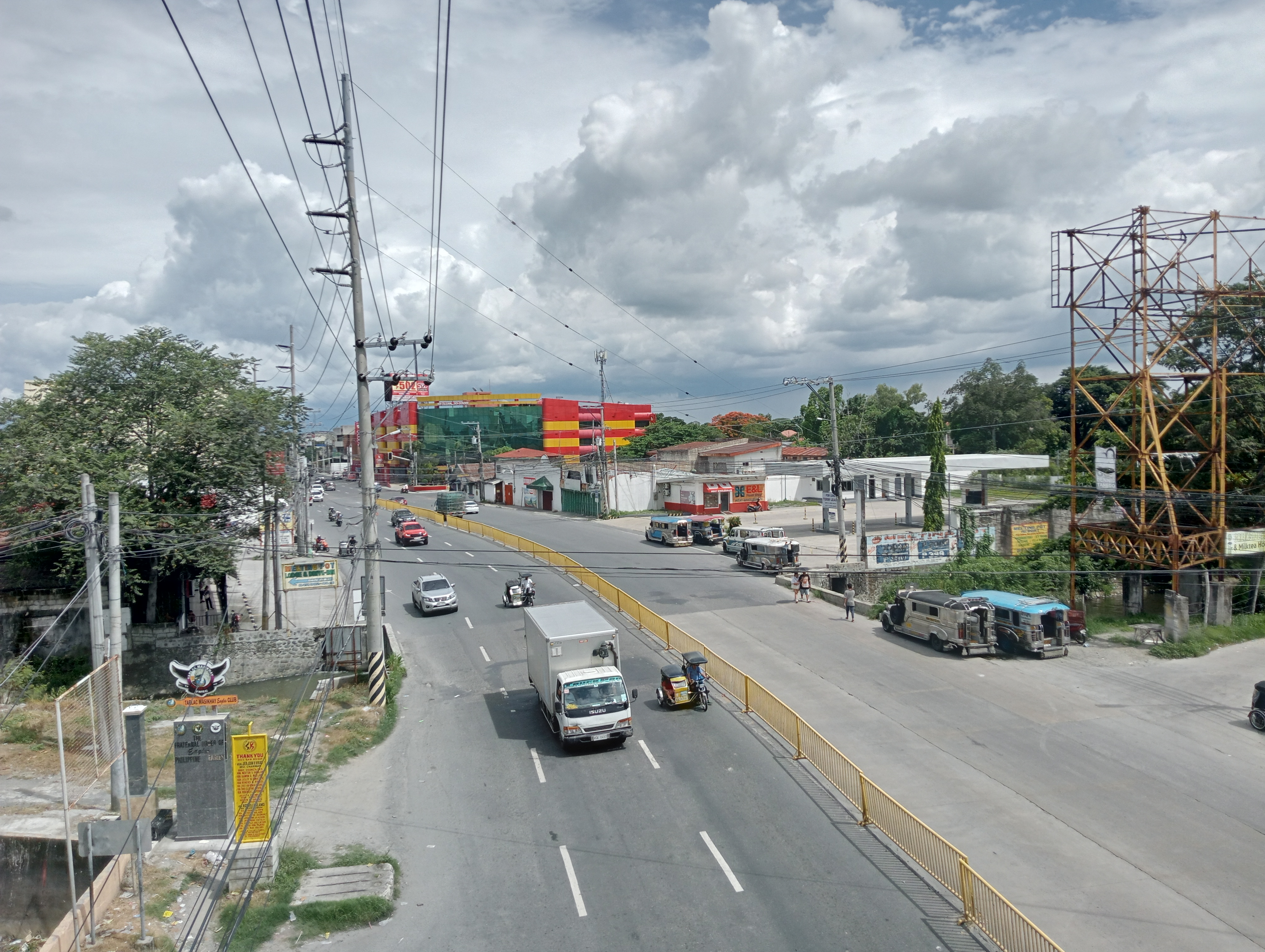
The highway in Tarlac City

- N213 in Capas
- N55 at Tarlac City
- N58 in Santo Cristo, Tarlac City
- N242 in Paniqui (two eastern termini; intersects thrice)

=== Pangasinan ===
- N56 / N212 in Rosales
- N211 in Villasis
- N245 in Urdaneta
- N57 in Urdaneta. Official northern end of MacArthur Highway section on Manila North Road.
- N245 in Urdaneta
- E1 (TPLEX) in Urdaneta
- N210 in Binalonan
- N210-1 in Binalonan
- E1 (TPLEX) in Pozorrubio

=== La Union ===
- N54 (Kennon Road) at Camp 1, Rosario.
- E1 (TPLEX) / N209 (Pugo–Rosario Road) at Subusub, Rosario
- N209 in Rosario (two southern termini)
- N208 in Agoo
- N55 in Agoo
- N54 at Bauang
- N219 in San Fernando
- N249 in San Fernando
- N218 in San Fernando
- N249 in San Fernando
- N249 in San Juan

=== Ilocos Sur ===
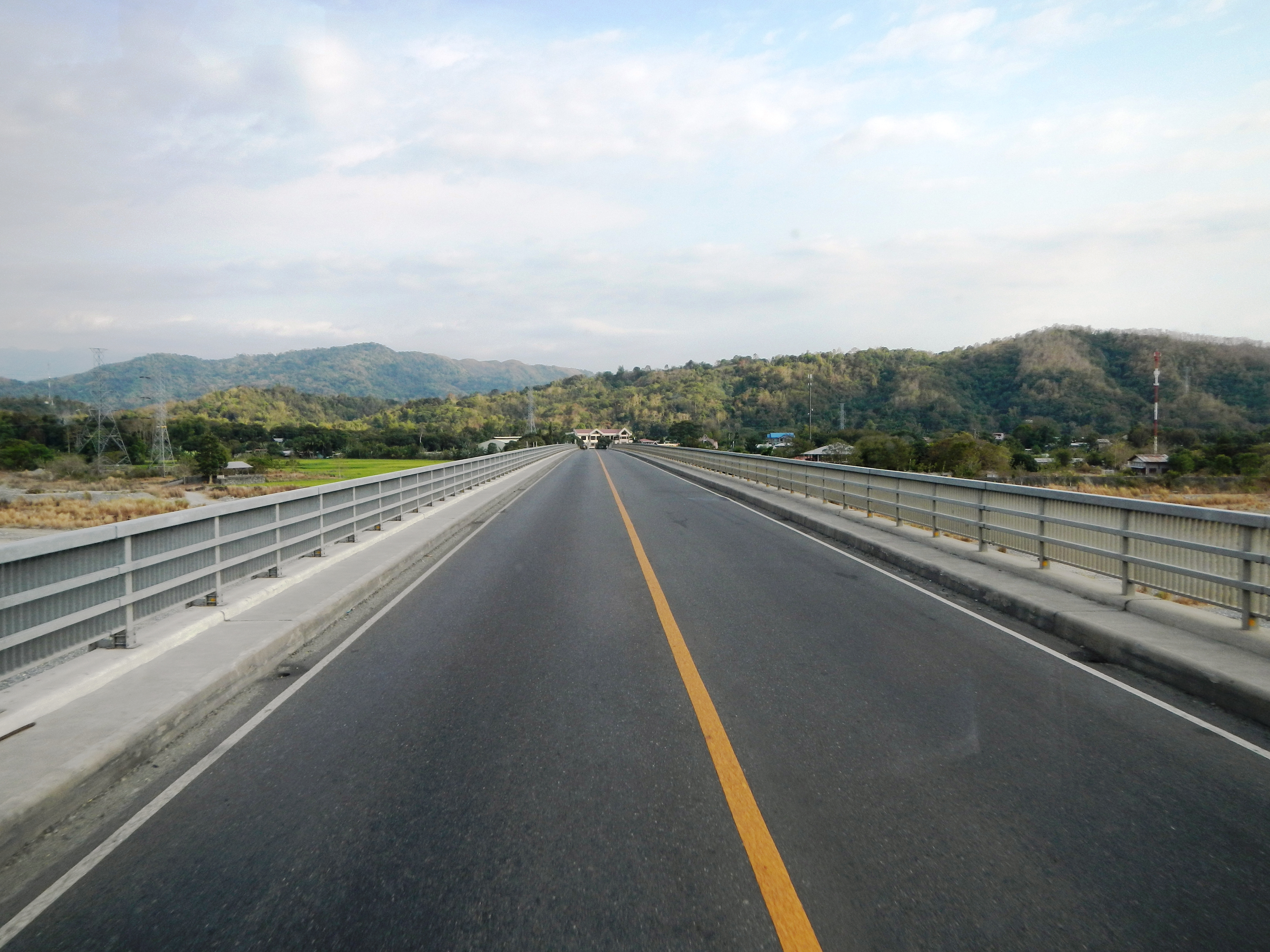
Amburayan Bridge at the La Union–Ilocos Sur boundary

- N205 in Tagudin
- N244 in Candon (northern and southern termini)
- N203 in Narvacan
- N204 in Narvacan
- N203 in Narvacan
- N202 in Bantay
- N201 in Cabugao

=== Ilocos Norte ===
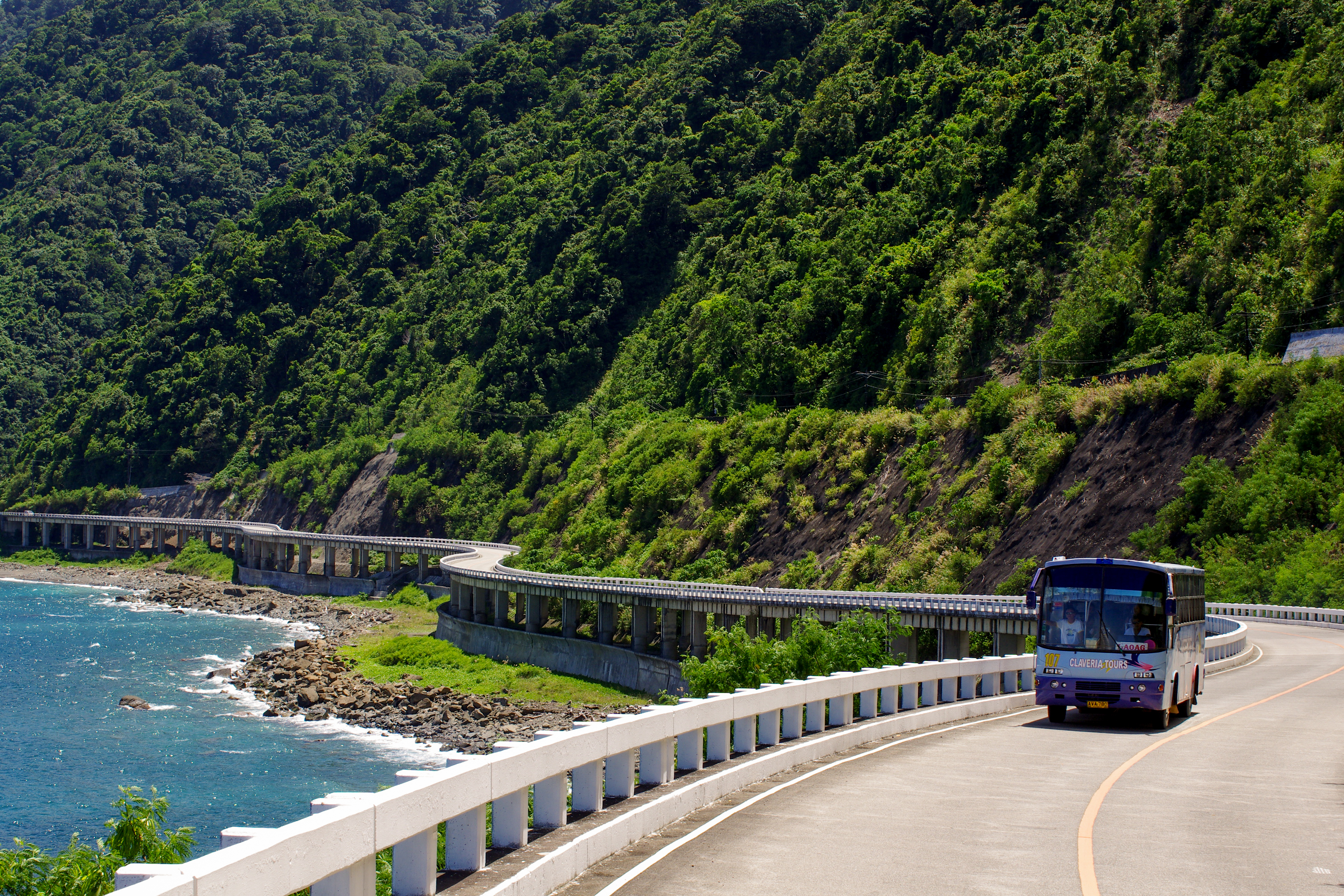
Patapat Viaduct in Pagudpud carries Manila North Road's section that is the second part of N1 but with the AH26 concurrency.

- N200 in Currimao
- N122 in Currimao
- N100 in Laoag. Northern terminus of N2. Transition to N1/AH26.
- N122 in Bacarra

=== Cagayan ===
- N223 in Abulug
- N121 in Abulug
- AH26 in Aparri. Transition from N1/AH26 to unnumbered tertiary road.

== Landmarks ==
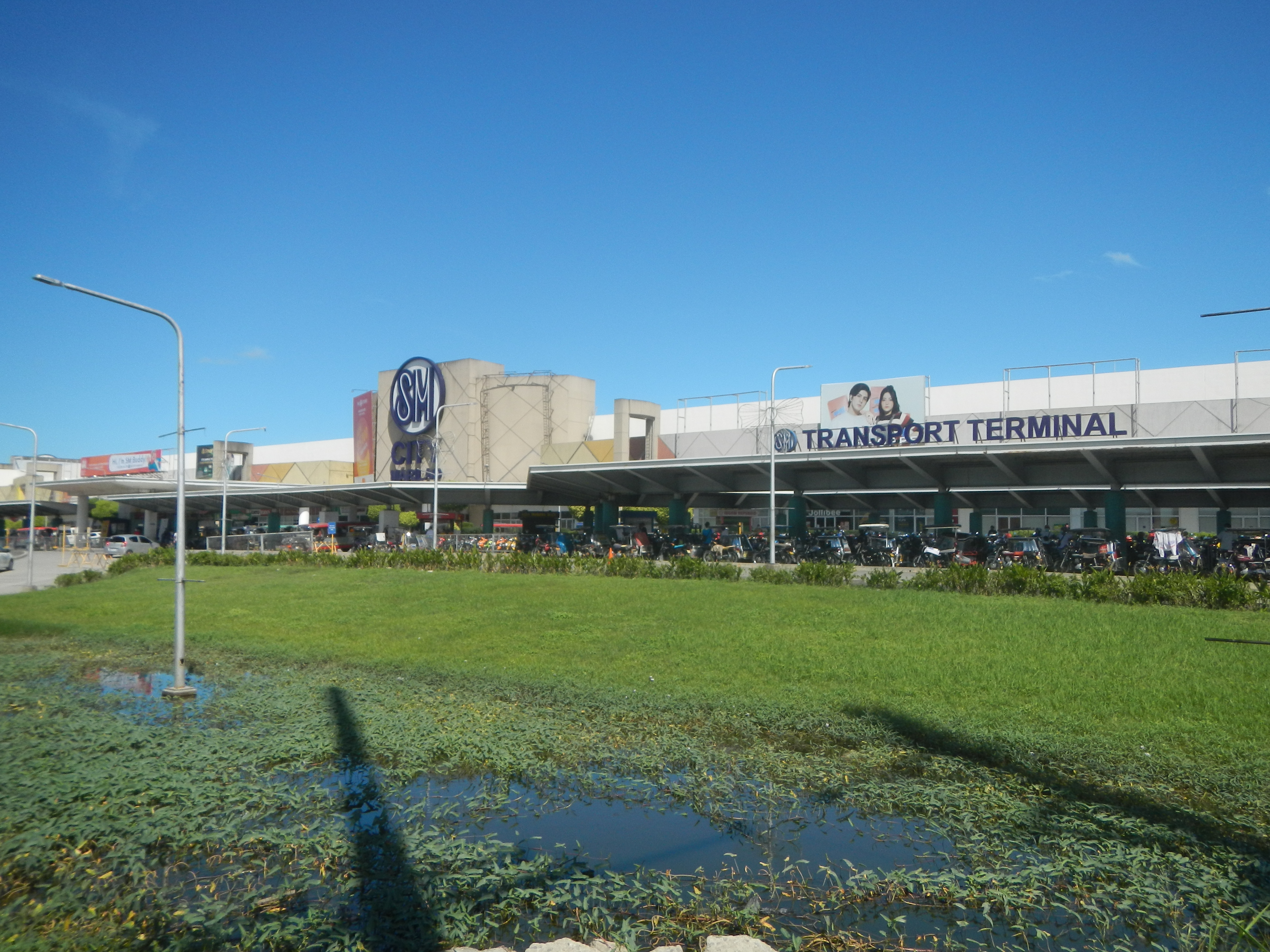
SM City Marilao as seen from the MacArthur Highway in 2020

This is from its south end at the Bonifacio Monument in Caloocan, to its north end at Aparri, Cagayan

Metro Manila
- Bonifacio Monument, Caloocan
- Our Lady of Fatima University
- SM City Valenzuela
- Karuhatan Interchange (NLEX Harbor Link)
- Valenzuela City Hall
- Valenzuela station

Bulacan

- Meycauayan College, Meycauayan
- Meycauayan station
- Meycauayan City Hall
- SM City Marilao, Marilao
- Pambayang Dalubhasaan ng Marilao
- Old Balagtas Municipal Hall, Balagtas
- Balagtas Town Center
- Tabang Interchange (North Luzon Expressway), Guiguinto
- Robinsons Place Malolos, Malolos
- Malolos station
- Bulacan Provincial Capitol
- Bulacan State University
- New Malolos City Hall
- Malolos Sports and Convention Center
- Centro Escolar University Malolos
- Colegio de Calumpit, Calumpit
- Calumpit Municipal Hall
- Calumpit Cemetery
- Calumpit station

Pampanga

- New Apalit Public Market, Apalit
- San Simon Municipal Hall, San Simon
- Camp Olivas, San Fernando, Pampanga
- Jose B. Lingad Memorial Regional Hospital
- Monumento Fernandino Workers
- Jose Abad Santos Avenue overpass
- St. Scholastica Academy Pampanga
- Republic Central Colleges
- SM City Telabastagan
- Angeles City Rotonda, Angeles City
- Angeles University Foundation
- Robinsons Angeles
- 2019 SEA Games Countdown Park
- Mabiga Interchange (Subic–Clark–Tarlac Expressway), Mabalacat
- Mabalacat Public Market
- Kamikaze East Airfield Peace Memorial

Tarlac

- Bamban Municipal Hall, Bamban
- Bamban Interchange (Subic–Clark–Tarlac Expressway)
- Capas Death March Monument, Capas
- Dominican College of Tarlac
- Capas Public Market
- Capas Municipal Hall
- Hacienda Luisita, Tarlac City
- SM City Tarlac
- Paniqui General Hospital, Paniqui
- Moncada Municipal Hall, Moncada
- Moncada Public Plaza
- Moncada Public Market
- San Manuel Town Hall, San Manuel
- San Manuel Cultural Center

Pangasinan

- SM City Rosales, Rosales, Pangasinan
- Villasis Town Hall, Villasis
- Urdaneta Philippines Temple, Urdaneta
- Urdaneta City Public Market
- Lyceum North Luzon
- Panpacific University North Philippines
- Pangasinan State University—Urdaneta
- Urdaneta City Hall
- University of Eastern Pangasinan, Binalonan
- Northern Luzon Adventist College, Sison

La Union

- Diego Silang Statue, Rosario, La Union
- Rosario Municipal Hall
- Rosario Town Plaza
- Rosario District Hospital
- Santo Tomas Public Market, Santo Tomas
- Agoo Town Square, Agoo
- Aringay Public Market. Aringay
- Caba District Hospital. Caba
- Bauang Town Plaza, Bauang
- Ilocos Training and Regional Medical Center, San Fernando, La Union
- Robinsons Place La Union
- Don Mariano Marcos Memorial State University
- Christ the King College
- San Fernando City Plaza
- San Fernando City Hall
- Saint Louis College La Union
- San Juan Municipal Hall, San Juan
- San Juan People's Park
- Bacnotan Public Market, Bacnotan
- Balaoan Church, Balaoan
- Bangar Church, Bangar
- Bangar Public Plaza
- Bangar Public Market
- Sudipen Municipal Hall, Sudipen
- Sudipen Farmers Public Market Ilocos Sur
- Santa Cruz Public Market, Santa Cruz
- Santa Lucia Municipal Hall, Santa Lucia
- Candon City Hall, Candon
- Candon Public Market
- Candon Plaza
- Candon Church
- Ilocos Sur Polytechnic College Santiago
- San Esteban Town Plaza and Hall, San Esteban
- Ilocos Sur Polytechnic State College, Santa Maria
- Santa Maria Public Market
- Narvacan Public Market, Narvacan
- Narvacan Mall
- Santa Public Market, Santa
- Bantay Church and Bell Tower, Bantay
- Bantay Municipal Hall
- San Ildefonso Municipal Hall, San Ildefonso
- San Ildefonso Church
- Rizal Park, Santo Domingo
- Santo Domingo Municipal Hall
- Santo Domingo Mall
- Magsingal Church, Magsingal
- Magsingal Municipal Hall
- Magsingal Public Market
- San Juan Municipal Hall, San Juan
- San Juan Public Market
- Cabugao Institute, Cabugao
- Cabugao Central Park
- New Cabugao Municipal Hall
- Cabugao Public Market
- Sinait Public Market, Sinait
- Sinait Municipal Hall
- Sinait Basilica

Ilocos Norte

- Mariano Marcos State University, Batac
- Batac Cultural Center
- Batac City Government Complex
- San Nicolas Town Hall, San Nicolas
- San Nicolas Plaza
- San Nicolas Church
- Abolition of Tobacco Monopoly Monument, Laoag
- Aurora Park
- Ilocos Norte Capitol
- Divine Word College of Laoag
- Bacarra Medical Center, Bacarra
- Pasuquin Public Market, Pasuquin
- Pasuquin Church
- Pasuquin Town Hall
- Cape Bojeador Lighthouse, Burgos
- Burgos Poblacion Park
- Burgos Church
- Bangui Wind Farm, Bangui
- Bangui Town Hall
- Bangui Public Market
- Patapat Hydro Electric Plant, Pagudpud

Cagayan

- Santa Praxedes Municipal Hall, Santa Praxedes
- Northern Cagayan District Hospital, Sanchez-Mira
- Cagayan State University Sanchez-Mira Campus
- Sanchez-Mira Public Cemetery
- Sanchez-Mira Plaza
- Sanchez-Mira Municipal Hall
- Pamplona Gymnasium, Pamplona
- F.L. Vargas College, Abulug

=== Bridges ===
- Tullahan Bridge (Tullahan River), Malabon–Valenzuela boundary
- Meycauayan Bridge (Meycauayan River), Valenzuela–Meycauayan, Bulacan boundary
- Marilao Bridge (Marilao River), Marilao
- Balagtas Bridge (Balagtas River), Marilao–Balagtas boundary
- Ugong Bridge, Balagtas–Guiguinto boundary
- Guiguinto Bridge (Guiguinto River), Guiguinto
- Tikay Bridge (Tabang River), Guiguinto–Malolos boundary
- Bulihan Bridge, Malolos
- Labangan Bridge No. 1 (Angat River), Calumpit
- Labangan bridges 2 to 7
- Calumpit Bridge
- Sulipan Bridge (Pampanga River), Apalit, Pampanga
- Talauc Bridge
- Santo Domingo Bridge, Minalin
- Dalaquitan Bridge
- Tinajero Bridge, San Fernando, Pampanga
- Del Pilar Bridge
- Pulung Bulu Bridge, Angeles City
- Abacan Bridge (Abacan River)
- Mabiga Bridge, Mabalacat
- Quitangil Bridge
- San Felipe Bridge
- Dolores Bridge (Sacobia River)
- Bamban Bridge (Marimla River), Bamban
- Anupul Bridge
- Cut-Cut Twin Bridge No. 1, Capas
- San Isidro Bridge, Paniqui–Moncada boundary
- Teofilo Sison Bridge, Rosales–Villasis boundary
- San Nicolas Bridge
- Macalong Bridge, Urdaneta
- Mitura Bridge
- Tagamusing Bridge
- Bobonan Bridge, Binalonan
- Bued Bridge (Bued River), Sison, Pangasinan–Rosario, La Union boundary
- Nilangoyan Bridge
- Principe Bridge, Agoo
- Tabora Bridge
- Aringay Bridge (Aringay River), Aringay
- Caba Bridge, Caba
- Bagbag Bridge
- Bauang Bridge (Naguillian River), Bauang
- Magsabang Bridge
- Lossec Bridge
- Pagdalagan Bridge, Bauang–San Fernando, La Union boundary
- Carlatan Bridge (Carlatan Creek)
- Taboc Bridge (Taboc River), San Juan
- Baroro Bridge (Baroro River), Bacnotan
- Santa Rita Bridge
- Maragayap East Bridge
- Borobor Bridge, Balaoan–Bangar boundary
- Amburayan Bridge (Amburayan River), Supiden, La Union–Tagudin, Ilocos Sur boundary
- Borono Bridge, Santa Cruz
- Tampugo Bridge
- Paratong Bridge
- Sevilla Bridge
- Casitagan Bridge
- Bayugao Bridge
- Sawat Bridge
- Santa Cruz Bridge
- San Juan Bridge, Santa Lucia
- Banas Bridge, Badoc
- Badoc Bridge
- Tipcal Bridge, Currimao
- Santa Lucia Bridge, Santa Lucia
- Cavite bridges
- Nagbaudan Bridge, Candon
- Alambique Bridge
- Tabiac Bridge
- Bucong Bridge (Bucong River)
- Santiago Bridge, Santiago
- San Esteban Bridge, San Esteban
- Suso Bridge, Santa Maria
- Santa Maria Centennial Bridge (Santa Maria River)
- San Antonio Bridge, Narvacan
- Quinarayan Bridge
- Bantay Abut bridges
- Sulvec Bridges
- Quirino Bridge (Abra River), Santa–Bantay boundary
- Bulag bridges, Bantay
- Barebec Bridge, San Ildefonso
- Bussawit bridges
- Magsingal Bridge, Magsingal
- Parsua Bridge, San Juan
- Bical Bridge
- San Juan bridges
- Osmeña Bridge, Cabugao
- Bimmeclat Bridge, Cabugao–Sinait boundary
- Sapilang Bridge
- Teppeng Bridge
- Sinat Bridge No. 1
- Sinat Bridge No. 2
- Sinat Bridge No. 3
- Santa Cruz Bridge, Sinait, Ilocos Sur–Badoc, Ilocos Norte boundary
- Quiaoit Bridge (Quiaoit River), Batac
- Garasgas Bridge
- Nagbibingcaan Bridge
- San Pablo Bridge
- Gilbert Bridge (Padsan River), San Nicolas–Laoag boundary
- Tamucalao bridges, Laoag
- Bacarra Bridge (Bacarra River)
- Bangsirit Bridge
- Cadaratan Bridge, Pasuquin
- Pasuquin Bridge (Pasuquin River)
- Caruan Bridge
- Tulnagan Bridge
- Dirique Bridge
- Buraan Bridge (Pusuak Creek), Burgos
- Baruyen Bridge (Baruyen River), Bangui
- Banban Bridge (Banban River)
- Buagao Bridge
- Bolo Bridge, Bangui–Pagudpud boundary
- Baduang Bridge (Cabacanan River), Pagudpud
- Patapat Viaduct (Babuyan Channel), Pagudpud
- Pancian Bridge
- Paselang bridges
- Kilkiling Bridge, Claveria
- Claveria Bridge (Cabicungan River)
- Namuac Bridge, Claveria–Sanchez-Mira boundary
- Nagrangtayan Bridge, Sanchez-Mira
- Sanchez-Mira Bridge
- Bangan bridges
- Taguipuro Bridge, Sanchez-Mira–Pamplona boundary
- Caballebaan Bridge
- Allasitan Bridge
- Pamplona Bridge
- Bagu Bridge
- Dalayap Bridge, Abulug
- Calog Bridge
- Abulug Bridge (Abulog)
- Guiddam Bridge
- Pagga Bridge, Ballesteros
- Zinarag Bridge, Aparri
- Kalintaan Bridge

== See also ==
- Pan-Philippine Highway
- Philippine highway network
- List of places named for Douglas MacArthur
