= North Luzon East Expressway =

Proposed road in the Philippines

- North East Luzon Expressway; North Luzon Expressway East
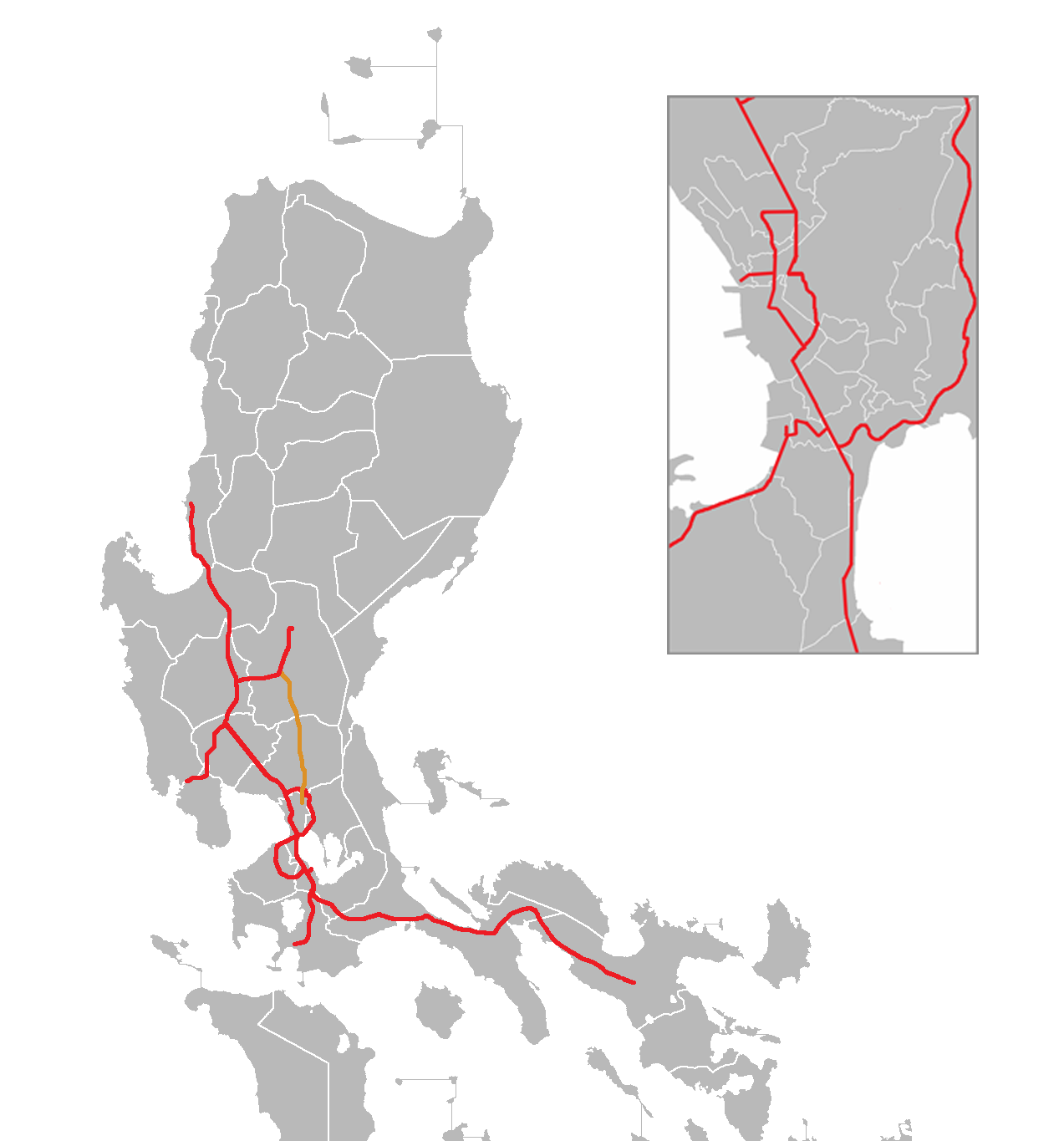
- Map of expressways in Luzon, with NLEE in orange

Route information
- Length: 111.1 km (69.0 mi)

Major junctions
- From: N170 (Commonwealth Avenue) in Quezon City; North Luzon Expressway (R-8) in Guiguinto, Bulacan
- To: Cabanatuan, Nueva Ecija

Location
- Country: Philippines
- Major cities: Quezon City, Caloocan, San Jose del Monte, Gapan, Cabanatuan
- Towns: Santa Maria, Norzagaray, Angat, San Rafael, San Ildefonso, San Miguel, San Leonardo, Santa Rosa

Highway system
- Roads in the Philippines; Highways; Expressways; List

The North Luzon East Expressway (NLEE) is a proposed four-lane, 92.1-kilometer (57.2 mi) long limited-access toll expressway in the Central Luzon region of the Philippines. The expressway was originally planned in 2000, when the route would have linked to the Cagayan Valley, and was later revised in the 2010s under the subsequent administrations.

== Route description ==
With a length of 111.1 kilometers (69.0 mi), the toll project consists of Phase I and Phase II and will form an important transport access in the eastern area of Central Luzon.

=== Phase 1 ===
Also known as La Mesa Parkways Project, the first phase of NLEE starts as a 19-kilometer (12 mi) toll road, beginning at a junction with Commonwealth Avenue, before continuing to Bigte, Norzagaray with an interchange at San Jose del Monte, Bulacan (Tungkong Mangga). NLEE then continues from Norzagaray before passing through the towns of Bulacan like Santa Maria, Angat, San Ildefonso, and San Miguel. Bridges will be required for the project to cross Bulacan's major waterway, the Angat River.

=== Phase 2 ===
The entire next phase of NLEE will be located in Nueva Ecija. It shall pass through the cities and towns of Gapan, San Leonardo, and Santa Rosa parallel to the Pan-Philippine Highway (AH26). Bridges will also be needed to cross rivers like the Peñaranda River and Pampanga River. The expressway ends in Cabanatuan, connecting with the partially completed Central Luzon Link Expressway.

The completion of the expressway has yet to be determined. However, NLEE will decongest the Central Luzon segment of the Pan-Philippine Highway once completed. It shall provide a faster route to Cagayan Valley, creating a more efficient trade route between the cities and municipalities of Bulacan, Nueva Ecija, and Metro Manila. The project will also cater to women working in its construction to promote gender equality in the workforce.

== History ==
The proposal to build an expressway was conceptualized in 2000 under the administration of President Joseph Estrada, when the proposal was dubbed the North Luzon Expressway East, a 250-kilometer (160 mi) highway as a build-operate-transfer (BOT) project that stretches from Commonwealth Avenue in Quezon City, Metro Manila, to Bayombong, Nueva Vizcaya. The Development Bank of the Philippines (DBP), in its letter dated February 11, 2015, expressed their interest in participating in the North Luzon East Expressway (NLEE) project as teansaction advisors. The Department of Public Works and Highways (DPWH) provided DBP with an electronic copy of the draft final report of the business case study on March 3, 2015. On July 13, 2015, Pertconsult International submitted the final report of the business case study to the PPP Center. The report was returned to Pertconsult on July 30, 2015 with comments and recommendations for consideration on the revision of the final report. The DPWH quoted that the construction of the expressway will begin on Q4 2016. However, the construction never pushed through and talks are still ongoing.

Pertconsult International resubmitted the final report of the business case study to the PPP Center on April 20, 2016, which is now under review. The DPWH has agreed that the transaction advisors (TAs) for the conduct of Feasibility Study will be procured through PDMF and included in the task of the TAs is reviewing and finalizing the financial model provided by the consultant, Pertconsult International. A meeting was held on 25 January 2017 at PPP Center to discuss the Technical Working Group (TWG) for the project and the schedule of procurement.

On June 4, 2022, NLEE has been signed recently among respective government agencies, with SMC Infrastructure (a subsidiary of San Miguel Corporation) as the proponent. The San Jose del Monte city government proposed an institutional agreement with the Metropolitan Waterworks and Sewerage System (MWSS) and SMC to utilize and develop portions of the MWSS Aqueduct Right of Way. The goal was to integrate the proposed Aqueduct Linear Parks and Pocket Gardens of the LGU with the North Luzon East Expressway (NLEE) project. The project's concessionaire was awarded to Ausphil Tollways Corporation (ATC). On March 1, 2024, NLEE has been delisted from the priority projects of the National Economic and Development Authority.

=== Status ===
As of June 25, 2026, the DPWH Public-Private Partnership (PPP) Service reported that the North Luzon East Expressway project has an approved Terms of Reference (TOR). The finalization of Estimated Budget Cost Estimates (EBC) for procuring consulting services for Transaction Advisory Services is currently ongoing.

== Exits ==
=== Phase 1, Stage 1 (Northeast Metro Manila Expressway / La Mesa Parkway) ===
Province	City/Municipality	km	mi	Exit	Name	Destinations	Notes
Quezon City					Commonwealth Avenue	N170 (Commonwealth Avenue) – Manila	Southern terminus
Bulacan	San Jose del Monte				Tungkong Mangga		
Bulacan	Norzagaray				Bigte		Northern terminus; connection to NLEE main alignment
1.000 mi = 1.609 km; 1.000 km = 0.621 mi: Unopened

=== Phase 1, Stage 2 & Phase 2 (North Luzon East Expressway) ===
Province	City/Municipality	km	mi	Exit	Name	Destinations	Notes
Bulacan	Norzagaray				Bigte		Southern terminus; connection with Phase 1, Stage I
Bulacan	San Ildefonso				San Ildefonso		
Nueva Ecija	Gapan				Gapan		
Nueva Ecija	Santa Rosa				Santa Rosa		
Nueva Ecija	Cabanatuan			Cabanatuan toll plaza			
Nueva Ecija	Cabanatuan				Cabanatuan	N308 (Central Luzon Link Expressway) – San Jose, Ilagan, Tuguegarao, Aparri	Northern terminus; connection to Central Luzon Link Expressway (CLLEX)
1.000 mi = 1.609 km; 1.000 km = 0.621 mi: Unopened
