= Bamban Bridge =

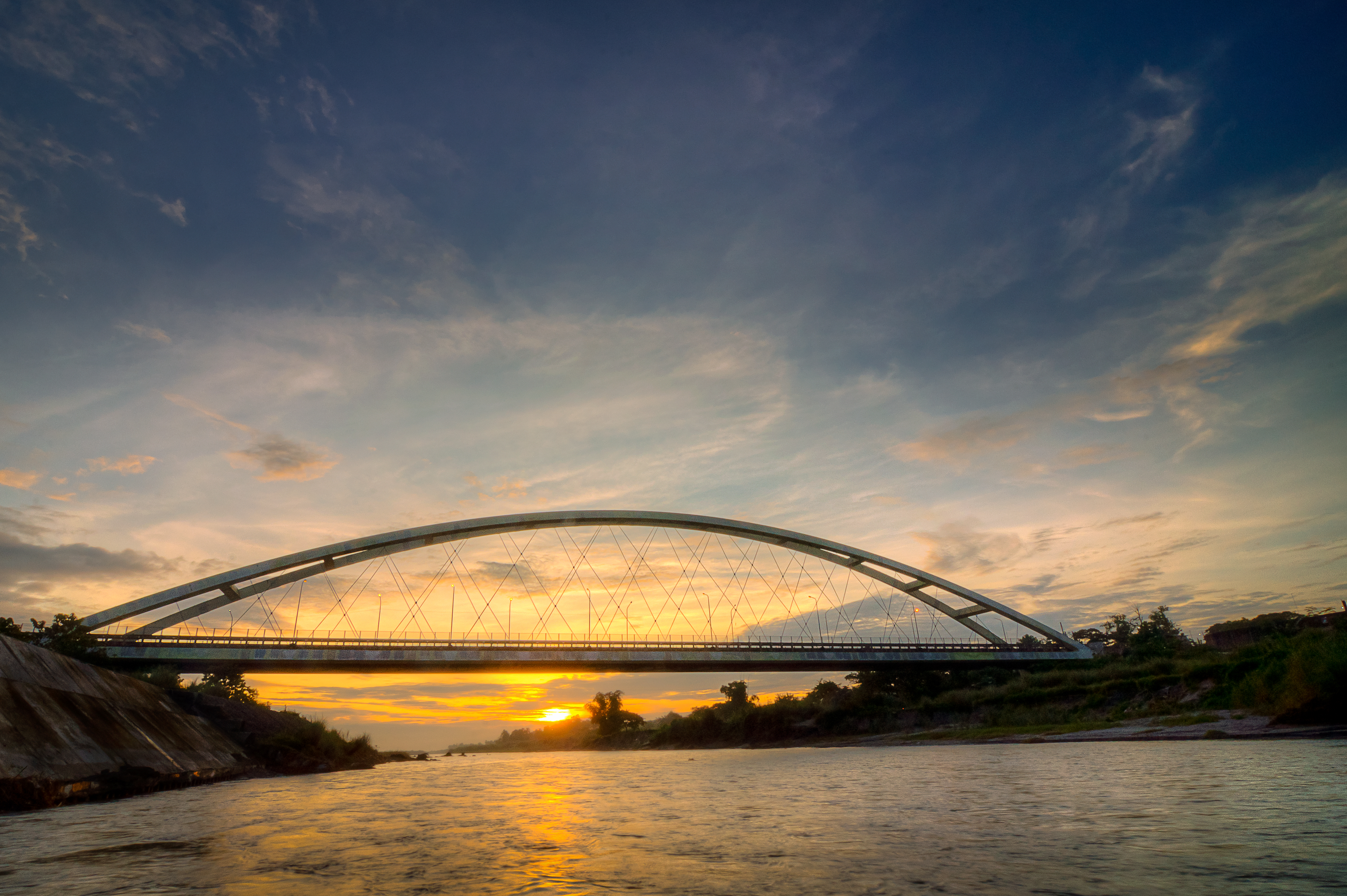
- Coordinates: 15°15′38″N 120°33′35″E
- Carries: 2 lanes of N2 (MacArthur Highway), vehicular traffic and pedestrians
- Crosses: Sacobia River
- Locale: Bamban, Tarlac and Mabalacat, Pampanga
- Maintained by: Department of Public Works and Highways

Characteristics
- Design: Basket Handle Nielsen-Lohse
- Material: Steel
- Total length: 174 m (571 ft)

History
- Construction start: 1996
- Construction end: 1998

Location
- Interactive map of Bamban Bridge

The Banban Bridge is a highway bridge in Central Luzon, Philippines, which is part of the MacArthur Highway (N2).

== History ==
The bridge was constructed from 1996 to 1998, as part of the rehabilitation efforts on MacArthur Highway, following the 1991 eruption of Mount Pinatubo. It replaced the old bridge that was destroyed during the eruption of Mount Pinatubo.

== Size ==
It is one of the longest basket handle Nielsen-Lohse bridges in the world spanning a 174 meters (571 ft) long and is one of the first of its kind in the Philippines.
