= Pangasinan State University—Urdaneta =

Public university in Pangasinan, Philippines

Pangasinan State University Urdaneta
- Pambansang Pamantasan ng Pangasinan Urdaneta (Filipino)
- Type: State University Satellite Campus
- Established: July 1, 1979
- President: Victoriano C. Estira
- Faculty: 88
- Administrative staff: 41
- Students: 3,020 (2010)
- Undergraduates: 2,650
- Postgraduates: 370
- Location: Urdaneta, Pangasinan, Philippines; 15°59′18″N 120°34′25″E
- Colors: Red and fold
- Nickname: PSU Patriots
- Sporting affiliations: State Colleges and Universities Athletic Association
- Location in Luzon Location in Philippines

Pangasinan State University—Urdaneta is a satellite campus of Pangasinan State University located in Urdaneta, Pangasinan, Philippines.

Pangasinan State University Urdaneta originated as a geographic satellite of PSU Asingan. The project to create a satellite campus in Urdaneta was inspired from the ideas of Rodolfo V. Asanion, who was then Dean of the Asingan Campus and later became the University President. It became a separate College of Engineering on August 1, 1989.

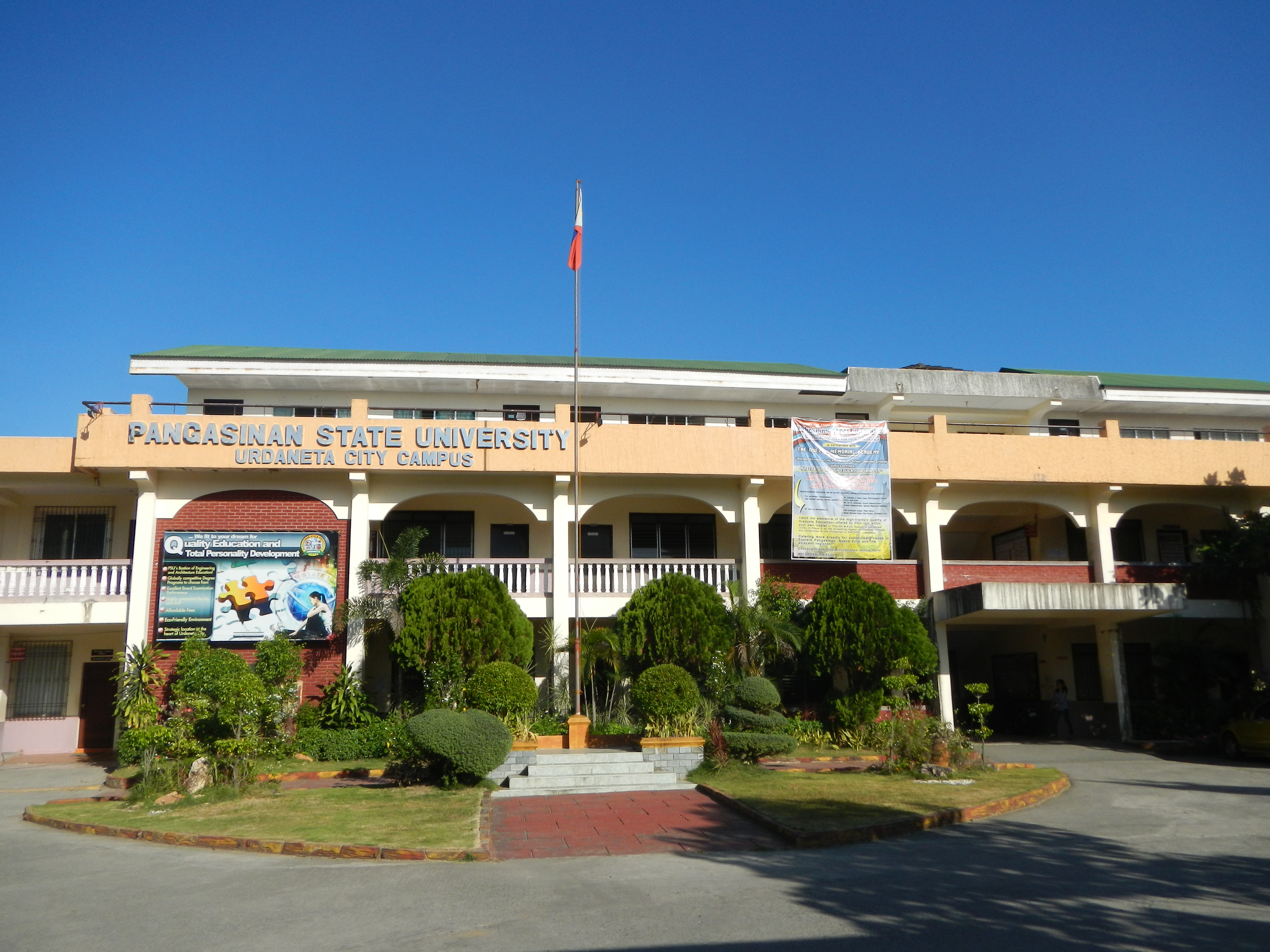
Facade of the Pangasinan State University—Urdaneta

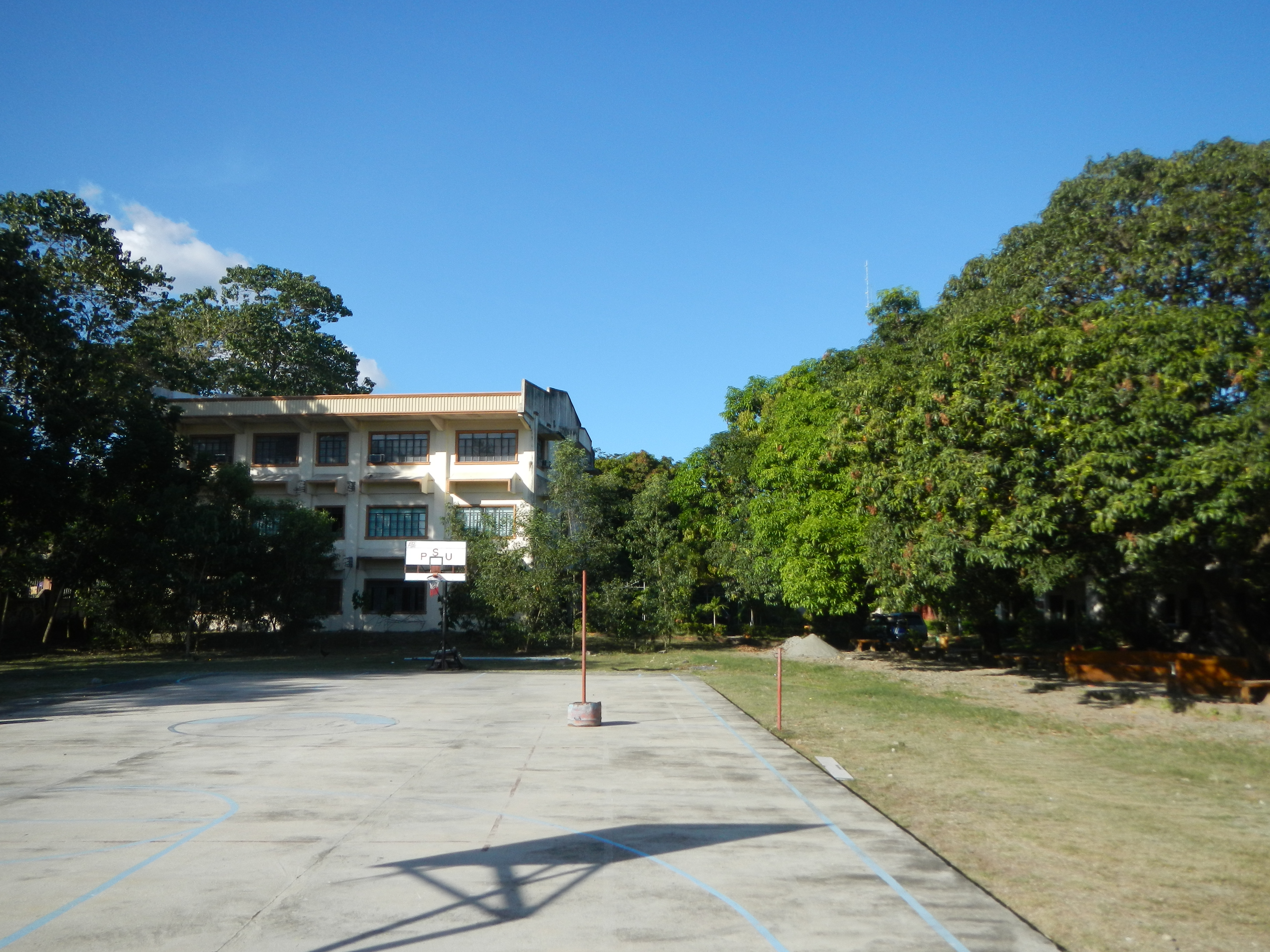
The Campus

== Programs ==
- Bachelor of Science in Civil Engineering
- Bachelor of Science in Electrical Engineering
- Bachelor of Science in Computer Engineering
- Bachelor of Science in Mechanical Engineering
- Bachelor of Science in Mathematics, major in Statistics
- Bachelor of Science in Architecture
- Bachelor of Science in Information and Communications Technology
- Bachelor of Arts in English
- Bachelor of Secondary Education, major in Filipino
- Bachelor of Secondary Education, major in General Science
- Bachelor of Early Childhood Education

=== Former programs ===
- Bachelor of Computer Science
- Bachelor of Science in mathematics, major in pure math
- Associate in Information Technology

=== Proposed programs ===
- Bachelor of Science in geodetic engineering
- Bachelor of Science in manufacture engineering
- Bachelor of Science in electronics and communications engineering
- Bachelor of Science in chemical engineering

== Student publication ==
The Technoscope Publications is the official student publication, funded and published by its students.

== PSU Graduate School ==
Although incorporated in same location, PSU Graduate School is autonomous and is administered by different professionals with the PSU Urdaneta (Undergraduate). It offers:

- Doctor of Philosophy in development studies
- Doctor of Education, with majors: educational management, mathematics, guidance counseling
- Master of Arts in education, with majors: educational management, guidance and counseling, communication arts-Filipino, communication arts-English, special education, science education, mathematics, technology and home economics, instructional leadership, computer education, social science
- Master in Development Management, with major in public management
- Master in Management Engineering
- Master of Science in agriculture, with majors in crop science and animal science
- Master of Science in Aquaculture
