= Romulo Highway =

Road in the Philippines

Romulo Highway
- Carlos P. Romulo Highway
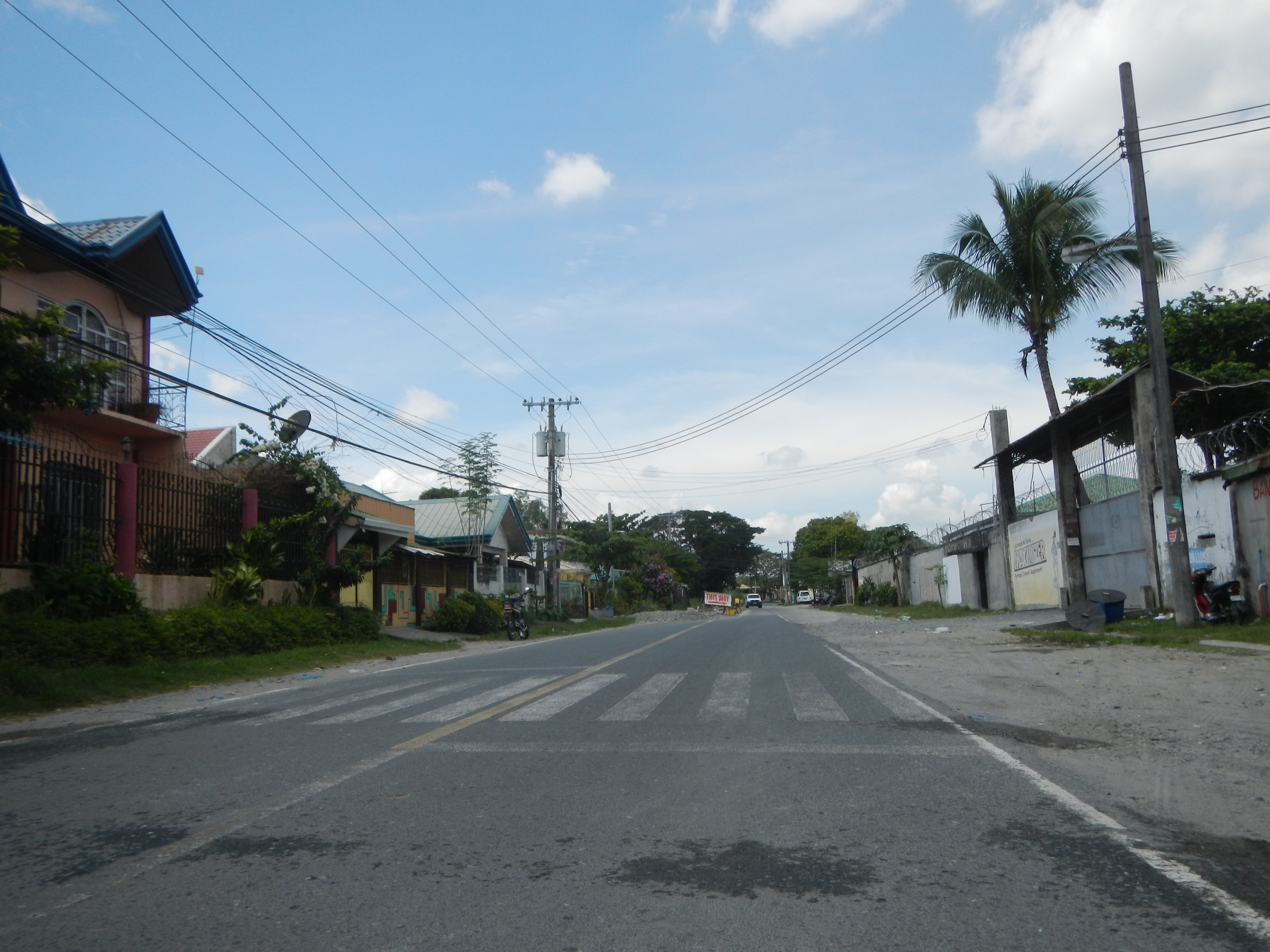
- The highway in Carangian, Tarlac City

Route information
- Length: 77.2 km (48.0 mi)
- Component highways: N55

Major junctions
- Southeast end: N2 (MacArthur Highway) in Tarlac City
- N242 (Paniqui–Camiling Road / Camiling–Malasiqui–Santa Barbara Road) in Camiling, Tarlac; N306 (Alaminos–Bugallon Road) in Bugallon, Pangasinan
- Northwest end: N55 (Lingayen–Labrador Road) in Lingayen, Pangasinan

Location
- Country: Philippines
- Provinces: Tarlac, Pangasinan
- Major cities: Tarlac City
- Towns: Santa Ignacia, Camiling, San Clemente, Mangatarem, Aguilar, Bugallon, Lingayen

Highway system
- Roads in the Philippines; Highways; Expressways; List
← N54	→ N56

Romulo Highway, also known as Carlos P. Romulo Highway, is a 77.2-kilometer (48.0 mi) major highway in the Philippines that connects the provinces of Tarlac and Pangasinan. It is alternatively known as Tarlac–Pangasinan Road from Tarlac City to Bugallon, Pangasinan and as a component of Pangasinan–Zambales Road and Bugallon–Lingayen Road from Bugallon to Lingayen.

The highway is named after Filipino diplomat, politician, soldier, journalist and author Carlos P. Romulo, who had served, among other things, as President of the United Nations General Assembly from 1949–1950. Romulo was born in town of Camiling, Tarlac, through which the highway passes.

The entire road forms part of National Route 55 (N55) of the Philippine highway network.

== Route description ==
Romulo Highway starts at The Tarlac Junction, its intersection with MacArthur Highway in Tarlac City, locally as P. Zamora Avenue. It then turns south in the city proper as Romulo Boulevard and then veers west and north as it approaches its crossing over Tarlac River. Past the river, it is only named Romulo Highway. It then traverses the towns of Santa Ignacia, Camiling, where it turns east into the town proper locally as Quezon Avenue before turning north, and San Clemente in Tarlac. It enters Pangasinan at Mangatarem and traverses the towns of Aguilar and Bugallon, where it intersects and becomes part of Pangasinan–Zambales Road. It crosses Agno River to enter Lingayen, where it ends at its intersection with Lingayen–Labrador Road in Baay, south of the town proper.

== History ==
The highway's segment from Tarlac City to Bugallon was historically designated Highway 13 or Route 13 that connected such then-towns.
