= Aliaga, Nueva Ecija =

Municipality in Nueva Ecija, Philippines

Aliaga
- Municipality
- Municipality of Aliaga
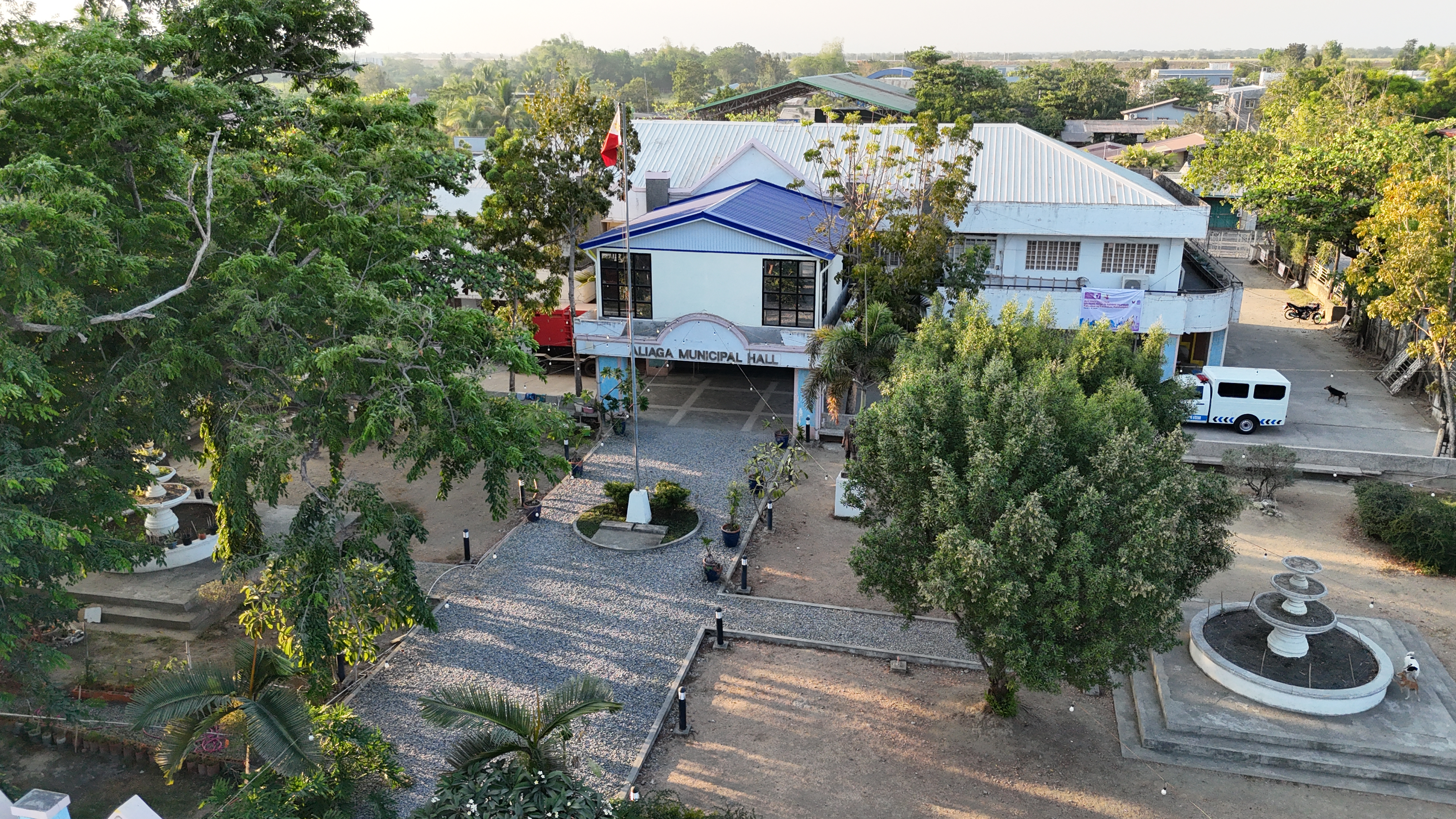
- Municipal Hall

- Seal

- Map of Nueva Ecija with Aliaga highlighted
- Interactive map of Aliaga
- Location within the Philippines
- Coordinates: 15°30′13″N 120°50′42″E
- Country: Philippines
- Region: Central Luzon
- Province: Nueva Ecija
- District: 1st district
- Founded: 1849
- Named for: Aliaga, Spain
- Barangays: 26 (see Barangays)

Government
  - Type: Sangguniang Bayan
  - Mayor: Gilbert Moreno
  - Vice Mayor: Au Moreno
  - Representative: Mikaela Angela B. Suansing
  - Municipal Council: Members: Ruth M. Macalinao; June D. Aguilar; Kap Sid Respicio; Ivan Bayudan; Dolor Alamon; Jomar Manubay; Memeng Vera Cruz; Sangko Onjing Garcia
  - Electorate: 51,139 voters (2025)

Area
  - Total: 90.04 km^{2} (34.76 sq mi)
- Elevation: 26 m (85 ft)
- Highest elevation: 43 m (141 ft)
- Lowest elevation: 19 m (62 ft)

Population (2024 census)
  - Total: 72,134
  - Density: 801.1/km^{2} (2,075/sq mi)
  - Households: 16,853
- Demonyms: Aliagueño (Male), Aliagueña (Female), Aliaguenean

Economy
  - Income class: 1st municipal income class
  - Poverty incidence: 12.11% (2023)
  - Revenue: ₱ 259.9 million (2024)
  - Assets: ₱ 995.6 million (2024)
  - Expenditure: ₱ 292.6 million (2024)
  - Liabilities: ₱ 378.1 million (2024)

Service provider
  - Electricity: Nueva Ecija 2 Area 1 Electric Cooperative (NEECO 2 A1)
- Time zone: UTC+8 (PST)
- ZIP code: 3111
- PSGC: 0304901000
- IDD : area code: +63 (0)44
- Native languages: Tagalog; Ilocano
- Website: www.aliaga-ne.com

Aliaga, officially the Municipality of Aliaga (Tagalog: Bayan ng Aliaga, Ilocano: Ili ti Aliaga), is a municipality in the province of Nueva Ecija, Philippines. According to the 2024 census, it has a population of 72,134 people.

== History ==
Originally known as Pulong Bibit, Aliaga became a town on February 8, 1849, and named after the Spanish hometown of its first gobernadorcillo, Aniceto Ferry. Aliaga, along with Cabiao, Gapan, San Antonio and San Isidro were transferred from Pampanga to the province of Nueva Ecija in 1848. It once included the present-day municipalities of Zaragoza, Quezon, and Licab. Kapampangans were the first settlers in the town, which was settled by the migrating Ilocano settlers.

== Geography ==
Aliaga has a relatively cool and healthful climate, and is situated about midway between the Pampanga Grande and the Pampanga Chico rivers, in a large and fertile valley. Historically, the principal products were mostly crops such as rice, tomato, eggplant, and squash.

=== Barangays ===
Aliaga is politically subdivided into 26 barangays, as indicated in the list below. Each barangay consists of puroks and some have sitios.

- Betes
- Bibiclat
- Bucot
- La Purisima
- Magsaysay
- Macabucod
- Pantoc
- Poblacion Centro
- Poblacion East I
- Poblacion East II
- Poblacion West III
- Poblacion West IV
- San Carlos
- San Emiliano
- San Eustacio
- San Felipe Bata
- San Felipe Matanda
- San Juan
- San Pablo Bata
- San Pablo Matanda
- Santa Monica
- Santiago
- Santo Rosario
- Santo Tomas
- Sunson
- Umangan

=== Climate ===
Climate data for Aliaga, Nueva Ecija
| Month | Jan | Feb | Mar | Apr | May | Jun | Jul | Aug | Sep | Oct | Nov | Dec | Year |
|---|---|---|---|---|---|---|---|---|---|---|---|---|---|
| Mean daily maximum °C (°F) | 29 (84) | 30 (86) | 32 (90) | 34 (93) | 33 (91) | 31 (88) | 30 (86) | 29 (84) | 30 (86) | 30 (86) | 30 (86) | 29 (84) | 31 (87) |
| Mean daily minimum °C (°F) | 19 (66) | 20 (68) | 20 (68) | 22 (72) | 24 (75) | 24 (75) | 24 (75) | 24 (75) | 24 (75) | 22 (72) | 21 (70) | 20 (68) | 22 (72) |
| Average precipitation mm (inches) | 4 (0.2) | 6 (0.2) | 7 (0.3) | 12 (0.5) | 61 (2.4) | 89 (3.5) | 96 (3.8) | 99 (3.9) | 81 (3.2) | 88 (3.5) | 37 (1.5) | 13 (0.5) | 593 (23.5) |
| Average rainy days | 2.5 | 3.0 | 4.1 | 6.3 | 15.8 | 19.4 | 22.5 | 21.6 | 20.1 | 17.5 | 9.6 | 4.0 | 146.4 |
Source: Meteoblue

== Demographics ==
Population census of Aliaga

| Year | Pop. | ±% p.a. |
|---|---|---|
| 1903 | 11,950 | — |
| 1918 | 12,703 | +0.41% |
| 1939 | 15,149 | +0.84% |
| 1948 | 12,594 | −2.03% |
| 1960 | 18,759 | +3.38% |
| 1970 | 24,449 | +2.68% |
| 1975 | 28,290 | +2.97% |
| 1980 | 32,349 | +2.72% |

| Year | Pop. | ±% p.a. |
|---|---|---|
| 1990 | 40,425 | +2.25% |
| 1995 | 45,815 | +2.37% |
| 2000 | 50,004 | +1.89% |
| 2007 | 61,270 | +2.84% |
| 2010 | 57,805 | −2.10% |
| 2015 | 63,543 | +1.82% |
| 2020 | 70,363 | +2.17% |
| 2024 | 72,134 | +0.60% |

Source: Philippine Statistics Authority

=== Languages ===
Tagalog and Ilocano are the major languages of the municipality. A minority of the population speaks Kapampangan.

== Economy ==
Poverty incidence of Aliaga (%)

Source: Philippine Statistics Authority

== Culture ==
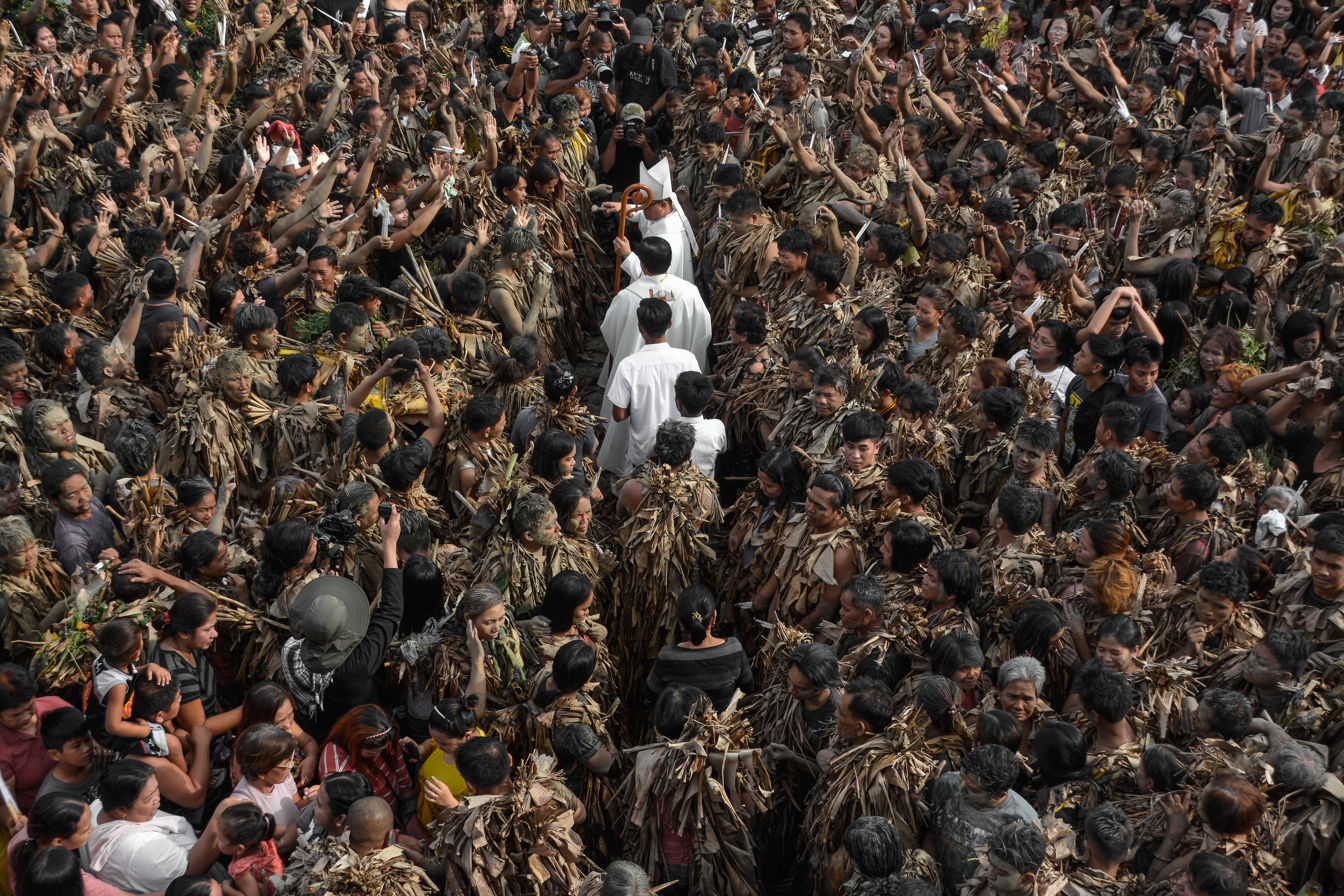
A group of devotees covered in mud gathering as a line of men in white robes travel through.

The Taong Putik Festival is an annual festival held in the municipality on the feast day of Saint John the Baptist every 24th day of June. The religious festival is celebrated by the locals and devotees to pay homage to Saint John the Baptist by wearing costumes patterned from his attire. Devotees soak themselves in mud and cover their body with dried banana leaves. Devotees also visit houses and ask people for alms in the form of candles or money to buy candles which are then offered to Saint John the Baptist.

== Education ==
The Aliaga Schools District Office governs all educational institutions within the municipality. It oversees the management and operations of all private and public, from primary to secondary schools.

Schools in Aliaga, Nueva Ecija
| School Name | Level | Type | Location (Barangay) |
|---|---|---|---|
| Aliaga National High School | Secondary | Public | Poblacion East II |
| Restituto B. Peria National High School | Secondary | Public | Bibiclat |
| Vicente R. Bumanlag, Sr. National High School | Secondary | Public | Sto. Tomas |
| Umangan National High School | Secondary | Public | Umangan |
| San Carlos High School | Secondary | Public | San Carlos |
| San Juan Integrated School | Elementary/Secondary | Public | San Juan |
| Aliaga Central School | Elementary | Public | Poblacion Centro |
| Betes Elementary School | Elementary | Public | Betes |
| Bibiclat Elementary School | Elementary | Public | Bibiclat |
| Bucot Elementary School | Elementary | Public | Bucot |
| Don Benigno Carriedo Elementary School | Elementary | Public | Pantoc |
| Don Emiliano Soriano Elementary School | Elementary | Public | Macabucod |
| Doña Elena L. Soriano Elementary School | Elementary | Public | Bibiclat |
| Gaudencio Medina Elementary School | Elementary | Public | San Juan |
| Gaudencio Medina Pantoc Elementary School | Elementary | Public | Pantoc |
| La Purisima Elementary School | Elementary | Public | La Purisima |
| Magsaysay Elementary School | Elementary | Public | Magsaysay |
| San Carlos Elementary School | Elementary | Public | San Carlos |
| San Emiliano Elementary School | Elementary | Public | San Emiliano |
| San Eustacio Elementary School | Elementary | Public | San Eustacio |
| San Felipe Matanda Elementary School | Elementary | Public | San Felipe Matanda |
| San Pablo Bata Elementary School | Elementary | Public | San Pablo Bata |
| San Pablo Matanda Elementary School | Elementary | Public | San Pablo Matanda |
| Santiago Elementary School | Elementary | Public | Santiago |
| Sta. Monica Elementary School | Elementary | Public | Sta. Monica |
| Sto. Rosario Elementary School | Elementary | Public | Sto. Rosario |
| Sto. Tomas Elementary School | Elementary | Public | Sto. Tomas |
| Sunson Elementary School | Elementary | Public | Sunson |
| Umangan Elementary School | Elementary | Public | Umangan |
| Aliaga Bright Minds Academy | Elementary/Secondary | Private | Poblacion West IV |
| Aliaga Ecumenical School | Elementary/Secondary | Private | Poblacion Centro |
| Bibiclat Ecumenical School | Elementary | Private | Bibiclat |
| Bonifacio Luz Natividad Educational Foundation Inc. | Elementary/Secondary | Private | Poblacion |
| ASKI Skills and Knowledge Institute | Vocational/Secondary | Private | Poblacion |
| Holy Family Academy | Elementary | Private | Poblacion |
| Regina Barbara Children’s Institute | Elementary | Private | Poblacion East I |

== Sister cities ==
- Cabanatuan, Nueva Ecija
