= Session Road =

Road in Baguio, Philippines

Coordinates: 16°24′45″N 120°35′52″E

Session Road

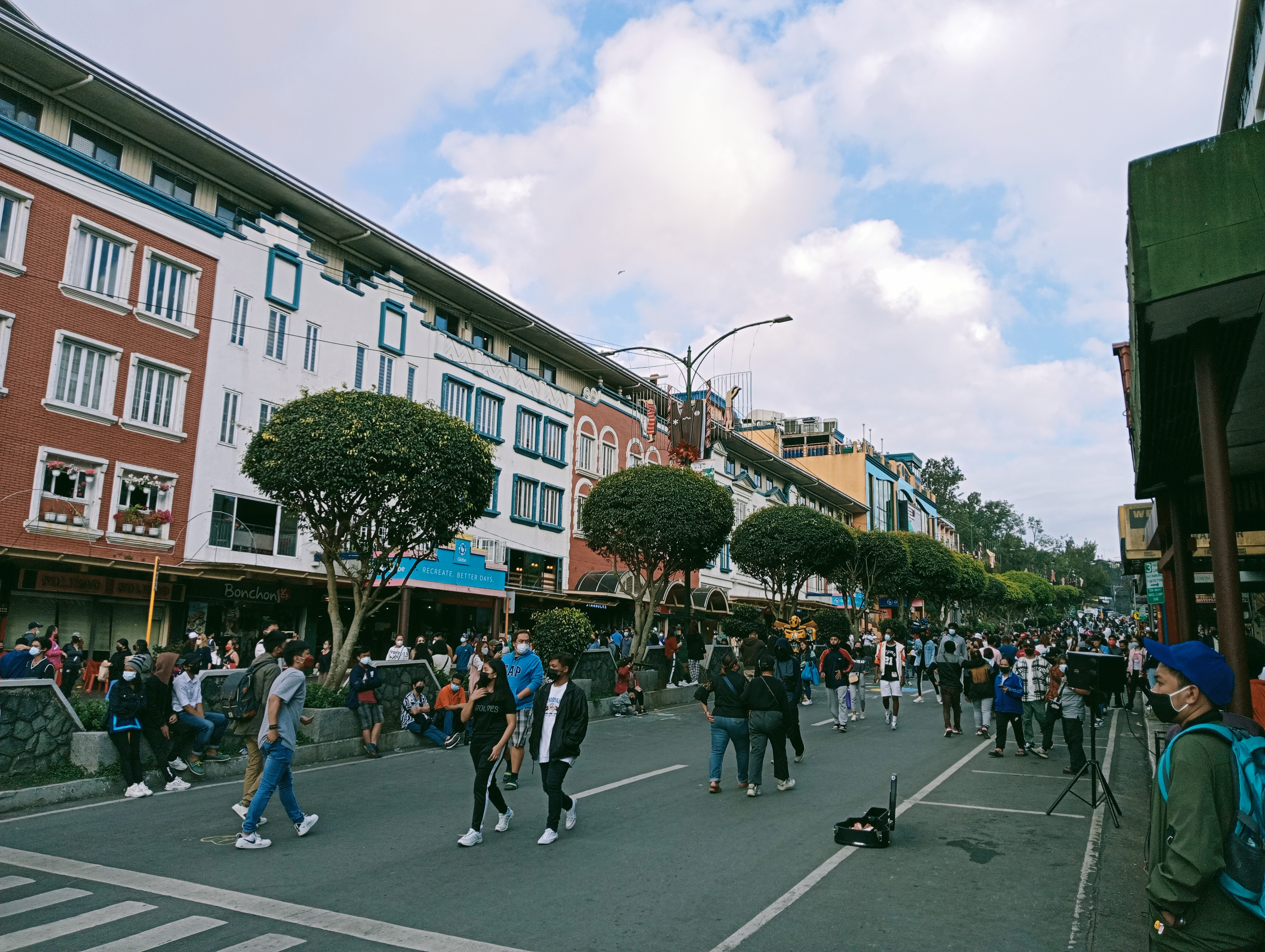
- Session Road in 2022

Route information
- Maintained by Department of Public Works and Highways – Baguio City District Engineering Office
- Length: 1.7 km (1.1 mi)
- Component highways: N231
- Restrictions: Bicycles; Motorcycles

Major junctions
- North end: N231 (Shanum Street) / N204 (Magsaysay Avenue)
- N110 (Governor Pack Road); N110 (Leonard Wood Road)
- South end: N231 (Loakan Road) / Military Cut-off Road / South Drive

Location
- Country: Philippines
- Major cities: Baguio

Highway system
- Roads in the Philippines; Highways; Expressways; List

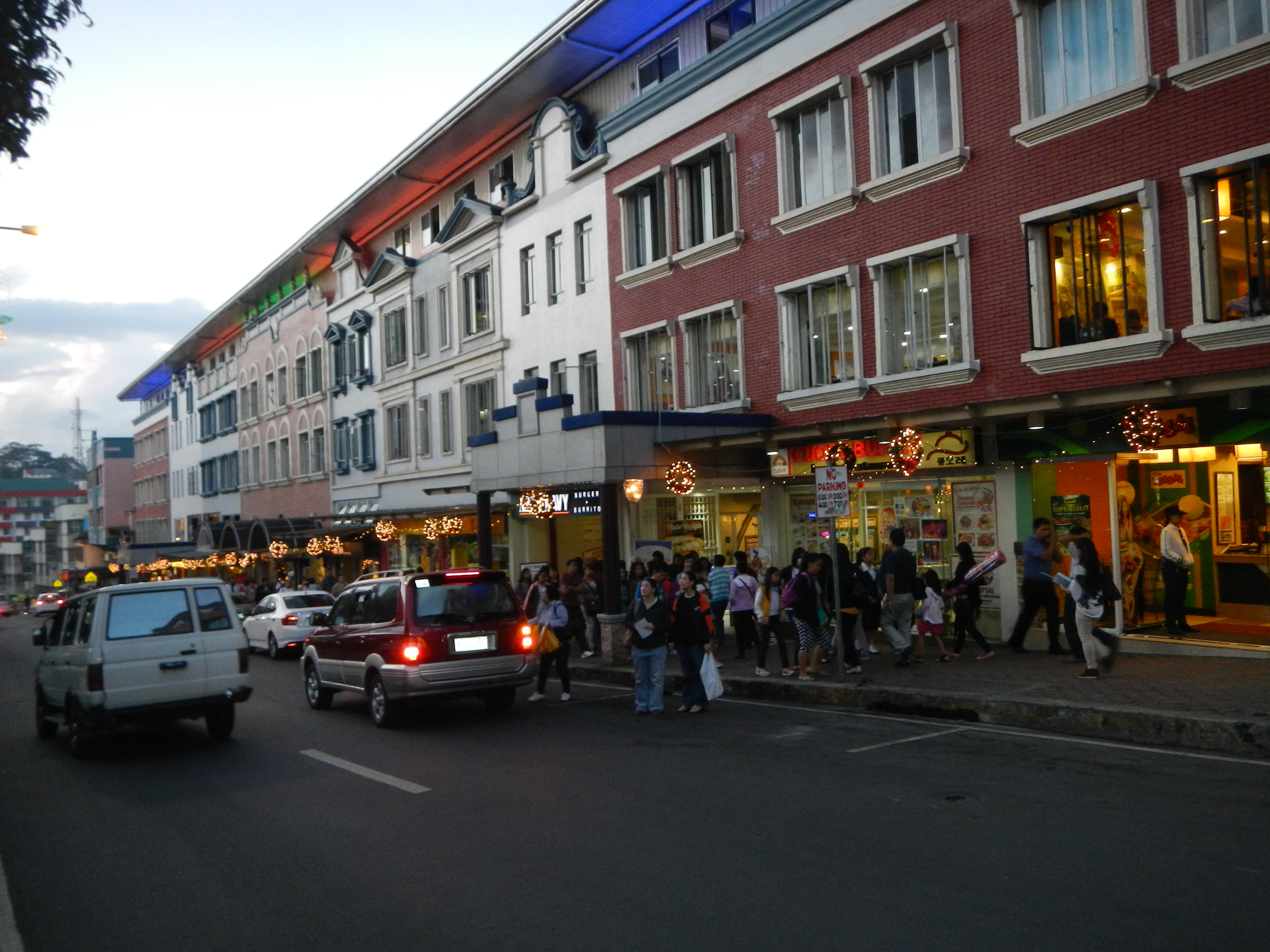
Shops along Session Road

Session Road is a six-lane 1.7-kilometer (1.1 mi) major road in Baguio, Philippines. The entire road forms part of National Route 231 (N231) of the Philippine highway network.

== Route description ==
Session Road is the main thoroughfare of Baguio in the Philippines and is the main hub of what is called the Baguio Central Business District.

=== Lower Session Road ===
The Lower Session Road extends eastward from Magsaysay Avenue (opposite the Plaza or kilometer zero and Malcolm Square) running through the BCBD until the intersections of Father Carlu Street (towards the Baguio Cathedral and Upper Bonifacio Street) and Governor Pack Road. This is the area where businesses are located, among others banks, shops, restaurants, bakeries, hotels, newsstands, boutiques, and studios.

=== Upper Session Road ===
The Upper Session Road extends from Post Office Loop, Leonard Wood Road, and the foot of Luneta Hill (where SM City Baguio is located) to the rotunda cutting toward South Drive (towards Baguio Country Club), Loakan Road (towards Camp John Hay, Loakan Airport, Philippine Military Academy, Baguio City Economic Zone, and the mine areas of Itogon, Benguet), and Military Cut-Off (towards Kennon Road).

== History ==
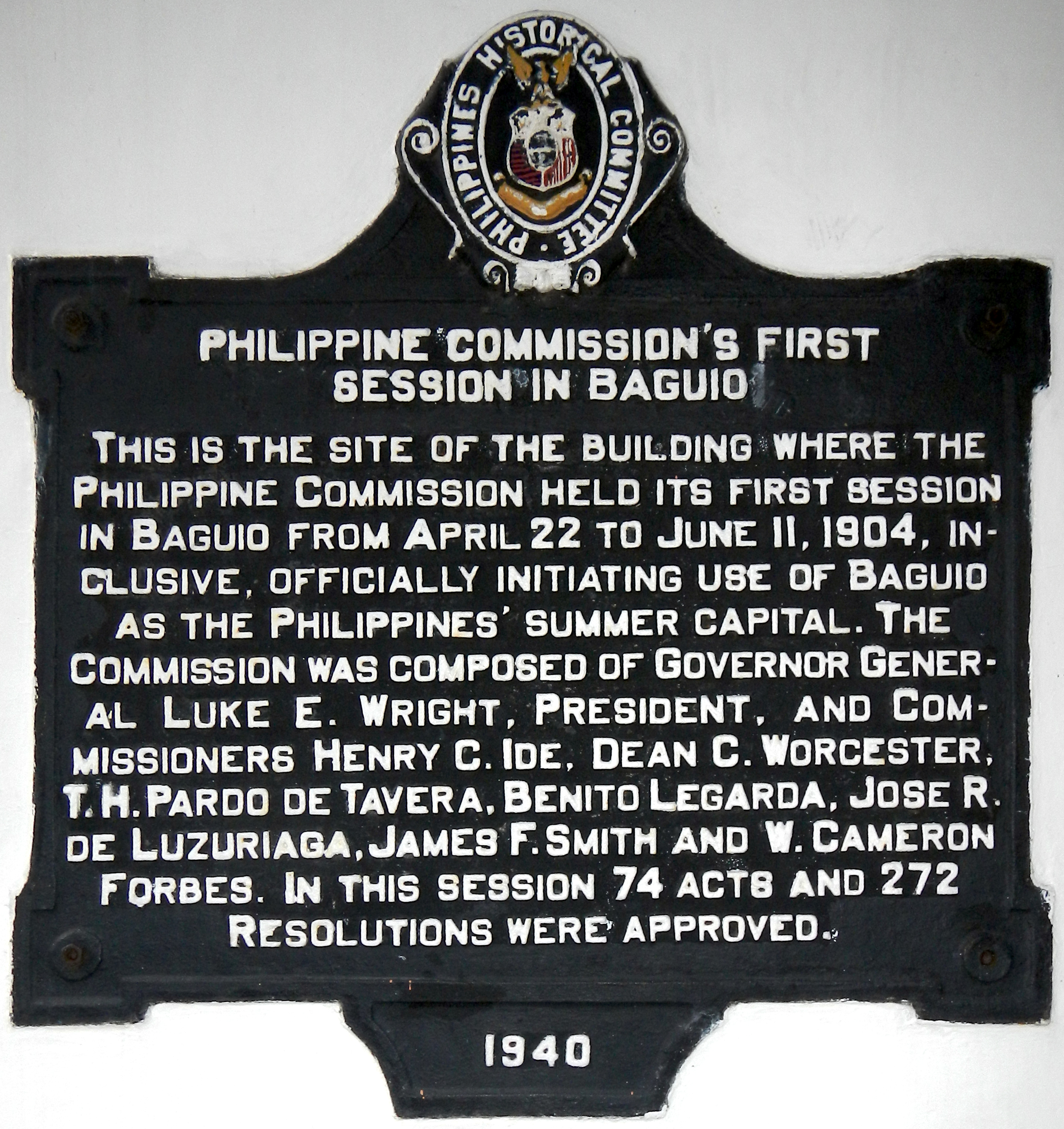
Historical marker in Baguio commemorating the first summer session of the Taft Commission to be held in Baguio, the namesake of Session Road

Session Road derives its name from the fact that it used to lead up to the old Baden-Powell Hall, where the Philippine Commission held its sessions from April 22 to June 11, 1904, and officially initiated the use of Baguio as the Philippine Summer Capital. The Commission was composed of Governor General Luke E. Wright, president, and Commissioners Henry Ide, Dean Conant Worcester, Trinidad Pardo de Tavera, Benito Legarda, Jose de Luzuriaga, James Francis Smith and William Cameron Forbes. A marker by what is now Baden-Powell Inn, beside the enormous bus terminals on Governor Pack Road, stands as the only visible evidence that anything of historical significance ever took place on Session Road.

Session Road used to host Japanese bazaars in the 1920s and 1930s. During World War II, the road was almost obliterated when the Americans bombed Baguio to liberate it from the Japanese.

The road was also part of Highway 11 or Route 11 that served the Cordillera Range.

== Intersections ==
The entire route is located in Baguio. Intersections are numbered by kilometer posts, with Rizal Park in Manila designated as kilometer zero.

km	mi	Destinations	Notes
		N231 (Shanum Street) / N204 (Magsaysay Avenue)	Terminus. Traffic light intersection. Access to Saint Louis University, Burnham Park, Baguio City Hall, La Trinidad via Buhagan (Bokawkan) Road & La Union/Manila via N54 (Naguilian Road)
		Perfecto Street	
		Mabini Street	One-way road
		F. Calderon Street	Access to Burnham Park
		Assumption Road	One-way road. Access to University of Baguio
		Fr. Carlu Street	Access to Baguio Cathedral
		N110 (Governor Pack Road)	
		Post Office Loop	Access to Baguio City Central Post Office, DICT-Benguet & DOTr-CAR
		Luneta Hill Drive	Access to SM City Baguio. Terminates at Session Road before North Drive and Kalaw Street crossing
		N110 (Leonard Wood Road)	One-way road
		North Drive, T.M. Kalaw Street	Former traffic light intersection. Right turn only for vehicles coming from Lower Session Road. Access to Sunshine Park & University of the Philippines Baguio
		T.M. Kalaw Street	One-way only to Session Road
		Utility Road	
		Marcoville Road	
		DPS Compound Access Road	
		N231 (Loakan Road) / Military Cut-off Road / South Drive	Roundabout terminus. Access to Camp John Hay & Itogon via Loakan Road; Wright Park & Baguio Country Club via South Drive; Manila/La Union/Pangasinan from N208 (Marcos Highway) and N54 (Kennon Road) via Military Cut-off Road
1.000 mi = 1.609 km; 1.000 km = 0.621 mi: Incomplete access

== In popular culture ==
A local Philippine band called sessiOnroad based their name on the famous thoroughfare.
