= Tarlac–Pangasinan–La Union Expressway =

Expressway in the Philippines

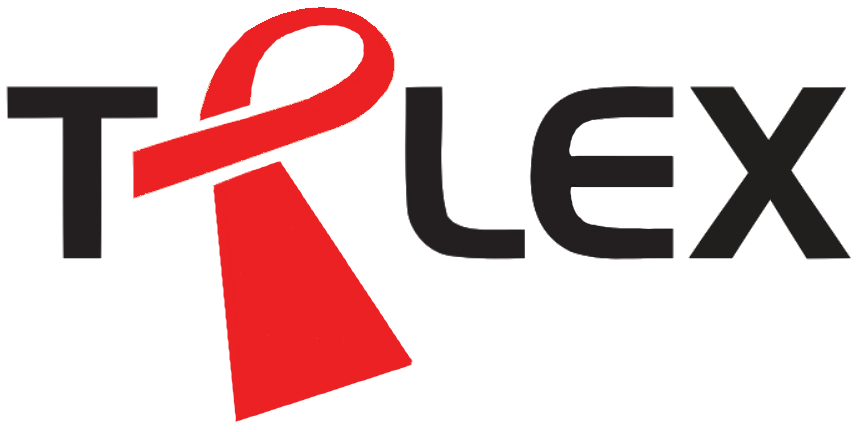
R-8 Tarlac–Pangasinan–La Union Expressway

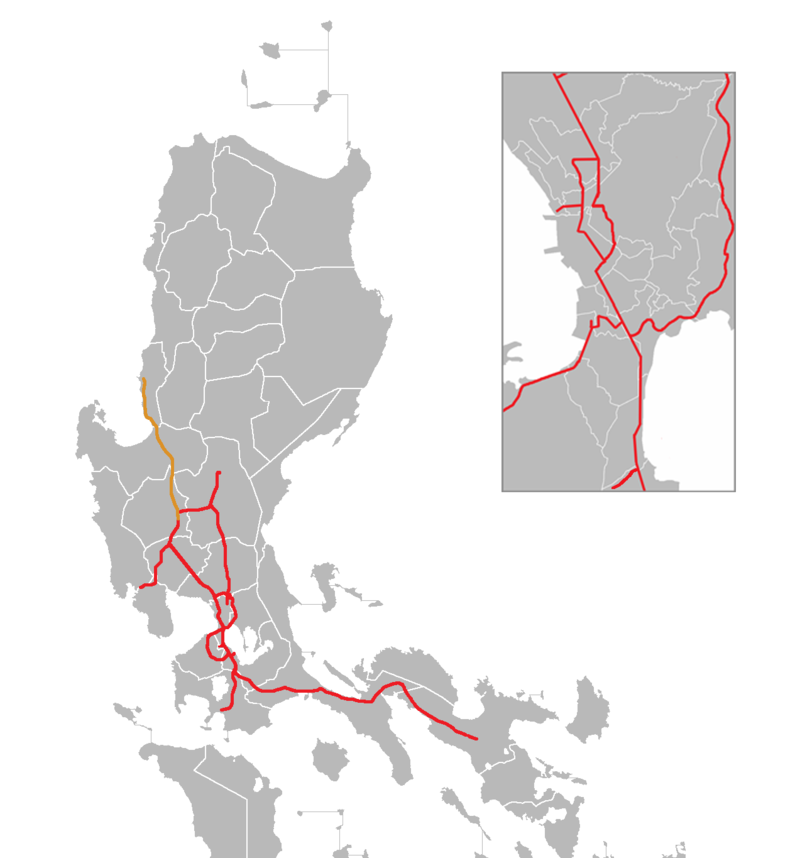
- Map of expressways in Luzon, with the Tarlac–Pangasinan–La Union Expressway in orange

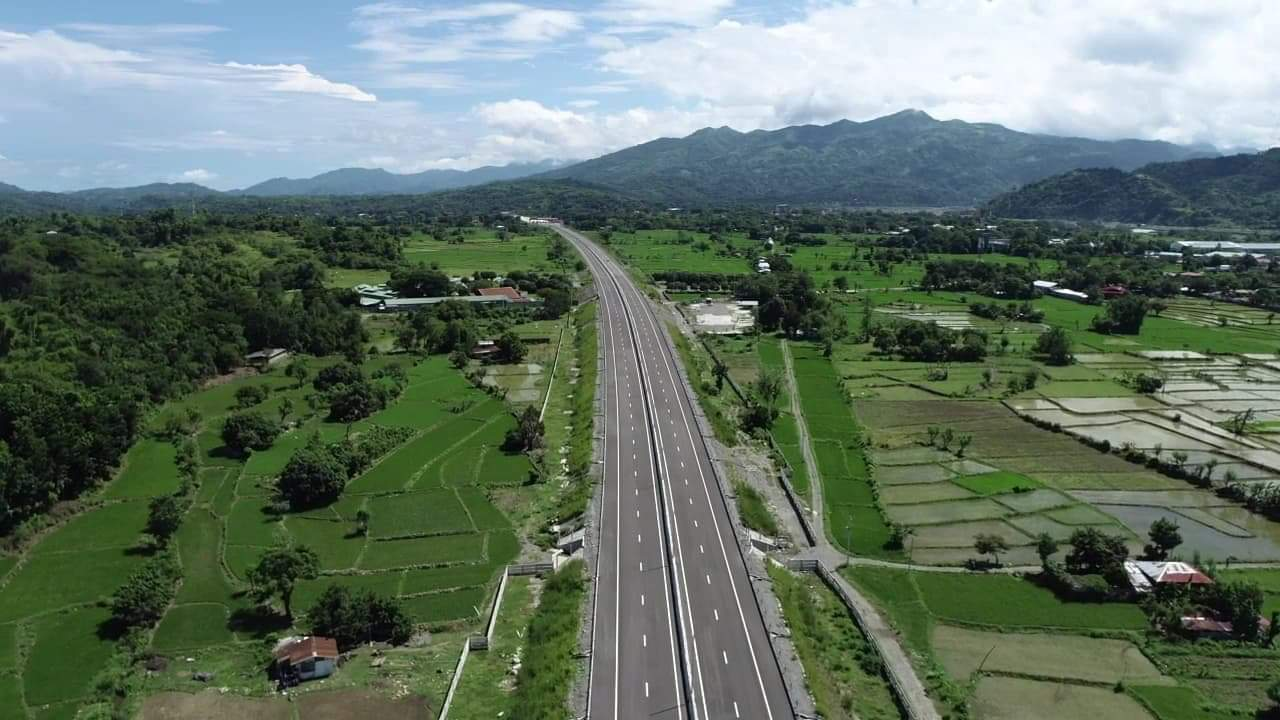
- Aerial view of TPLEX Sison–Rosario segment in Pozorrubio, Pangasinan, in 2020

Route information
- Maintained by SMC TPLEX Corporation
- Length: 89.21 km (55.43 mi)
- Existed: 2013–present
- Component highways: E1; R-8 R-8

Major junctions
- South end: E1 (Subic–Clark–Tarlac Expressway) / N308 (Central Luzon Link Expressway) in Tarlac City
- N2 (Manila North Road) in Urdaneta; N210 (Binalonan–Dagupan Highway) in Laoac, Pangasinan; N2 (Manila North Road) in Pozorrubio, Pangasinan; N2 (Manila North Road) in Sison, Pangasinan
- North end: N2 (Manila North Road) / N209 (Pugo–Rosario Road) in Rosario, La Union

Location
- Country: Philippines
- Regions: Central Luzon; Ilocos Region
- Provinces: Tarlac; Nueva Ecija; Pangasinan; La Union
- Major cities: Tarlac City; Urdaneta
- Towns: Victoria; Pura; Ramos; Anao; Nampicuan; Cuyapo; Rosales; Binalonan; Laoac; Pozorrubio; Sison; Rosario

Highway system
- Roads in the Philippines; Highways; Expressways; List

The Tarlac–Pangasinan–La Union Expressway (TPLEX) is a 89.21-kilometer-long (55.43 mi) controlled-access highway connecting Central Luzon and Ilocos regions of the Philippines. The expressway runs from Tarlac City to Rosario, La Union, connecting with the Subic–Clark–Tarlac Expressway (SCTEX) and Central Luzon Link Expressway (CLLEX) at its southern terminus in Tarlac City and providing a major route to the Ilocos and Cordillera regions. It is a component of Expressway 1 (E1) of the Philippine expressway network and Radial Road 8 (R-8) of the Metro Manila's arterial road network.

Plans for an expressway connecting Metro Manila and La Union were proposed before the 2000s; construction began in January 2010, and the first segments opened in October 2013. The expressway became fully operational in July 2020.

== Route description ==
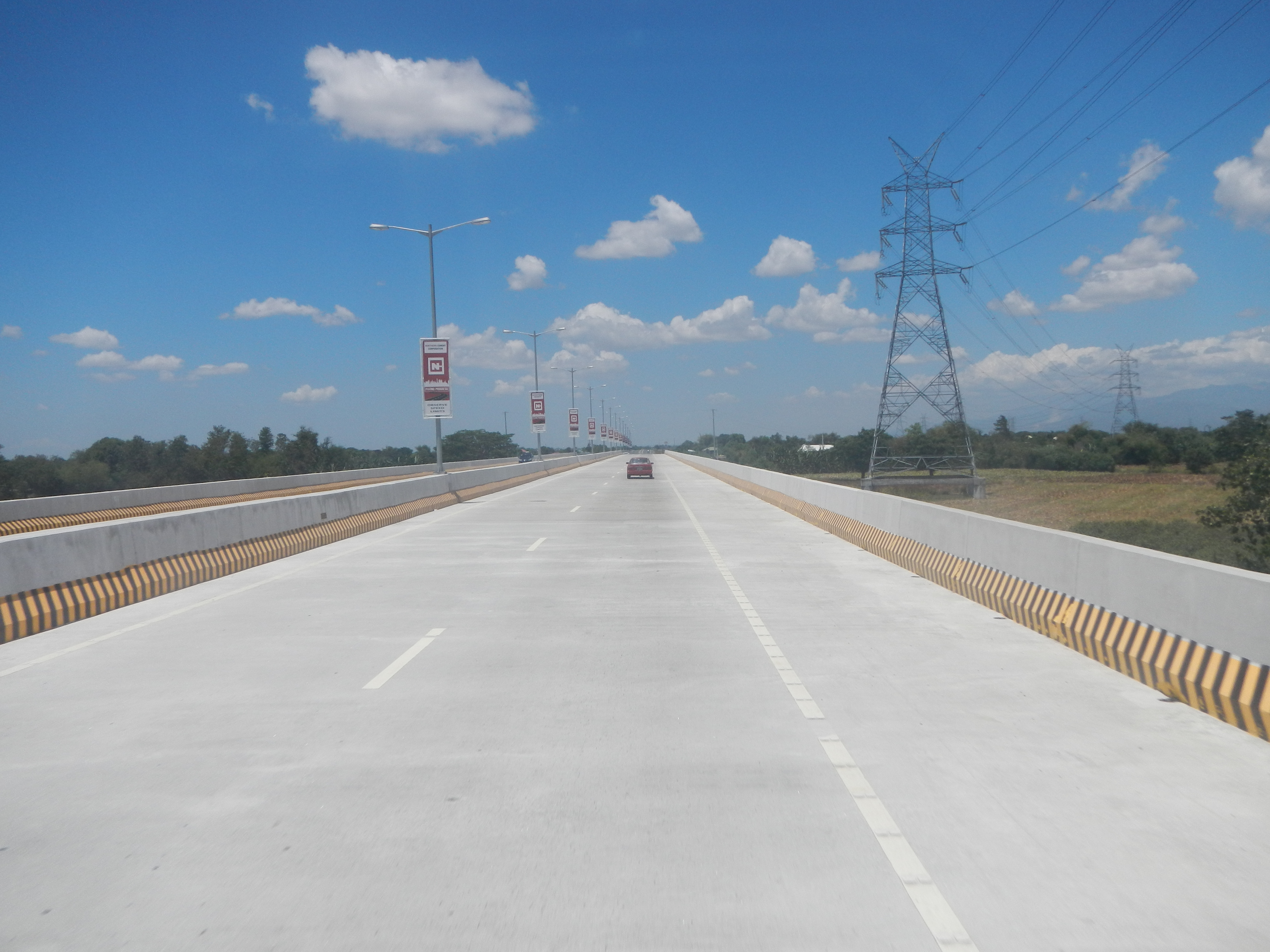
The viaduct across Agno River at the Rosales–Villasis boundary.

TPLEX follows a route that parallels the MacArthur Highway, running through the provinces of Tarlac, Nueva Ecija, Pangasinan, and La Union. The expressway has four lanes, two per direction, separated by Jersey barriers. Sections by exits, toll plazas, viaducts, and their approaches are illuminated at night. Significant sections are built on embankments overlooking rice paddy fields. The expressway crosses the four rivers in the Pangasinan province. The rivers along the TPLEX are the Agno River, Binalonan River, Aloragat River, and the Bued River.

The Tarlac–Pangasinan–La Union Expressway starts in Tarlac City as an extension of the Subic–Clark–Tarlac Expressway. The expressway passes through the municipalities of Victoria, Pura, Ramos, and Anao. Significant stretches of the expressway in Tarlac are built on embankments, and existing roads cross through underpasses built on cuts in the embankment. The road passes to Nampicuan and Cuyapo in Nueva Ecija without exit before entering Ilocos Region and Pangasinan, at the municipality of Rosales.

The Pangasinan and Ilocos Region segment of TPLEX starts in the Rosales municipality. The expressway then crosses through a viaduct over the Agno River, then enters Urdaneta, which is served by a single interchange to connect with Manila North Road. The Urdaneta exit was the expressway's northern terminus before the extension to Binalonan. Past Urdaneta Exit, TPLEX crosses above the Manila North Road, then passes over Binalonan and Pozorrubio. The last exit in the province is Sison.

Past the Sison exit, the expressway crosses as a viaduct over the Bued River. The road then enters the Rosario municipality, where the main northern toll plaza is located. Past the Rosario toll plaza, a spur road connects to the Rosario rotunda. This is the expressway's northern terminus. Proposals have been raised to extend the project to Laoag, Ilocos Norte.

== History ==
=== Conception and early development ===
Despite calls to create an expressway system from the Manila to Rosario, the southernmost town of the La Union province had been raised before the turn of the millennium. These calls began to bear fruit in the mid-2000s. In 2005, construction began on the Subic–Clark–Tarlac Expressway (SCTEX), a linked expressway system reaching Tarlac City. This was an improvement over the North Luzon Expressway's northern terminus in Mabalacat, Pampanga.

In the 1970s and 1990s, the government attempted to build the extension of the NLEX from Pampanga to Pangasinan; however, the plans were never materialized. In 1989, the Philippine National Construction Corporation proposed extending the expressway by 20 kilometers (12 mi) from Mabalacat to Capas, Tarlac, and 82 kilometers (51 mi) to Rosales, Pangasinan, following presidential decrees of 1977 and 1983, but the plan was not implemented.

In 1994, Italian-Thai Development pitched an idea of an extension of the NLEX to Pangasinan and La Union, as well as the expansion and widening of the expressway from four to eight lanes under the build-operate-transfer scheme. However, the agreement turned into a deadlock, and Congressman Mike Defensor was assailed for imputing motivations to Speaker Jose de Venecia Jr. for resolving, and also, Benpres (now Lopez Holdings Corporation), which involved the rehabilitation and expansion of the NLEX, was planned to include the extension to Pangasinan and La Union with agreement as its revision. Nothing came out of that undertaking.

On December 30, 1996, Itochu Corporation of Japan signed an agreement with the PNCC to build the extension of the NLEX to Pangasinan, and a pre-feasibility study was conducted. Meanwhile, the route has a total length of 88 kilometers (55 mi) from Mabalacat, Pampanga, to Urdaneta, Pangasinan, with a planned extension to San Fernando, La Union. When the PNCC and Itochu's proposal was not realized, the extension of the expressway was split into two expressways, the SCTEX and the segment between Clark and Tarlac City, and the TPLEX.

In 2004, the Bases Conversion and Development Authority (BCDA) proposed the 84.5-kilometer (52.5 mi) extension of the SCTEX to link Club John Hay in Baguio and Poro Point in San Fernando before ending in Rosario, La Union. The project, dubbed SCTEX2 as per House Resolution No. 791 authorized by Rep. Mark Cojuangco (Pangasinan–5th), cited the BCDA for its development effort. The project would later become TPLEX in 2007.

In 2006, Congressional representatives from Northern Luzon took advantage of the final reading of House Bill No. 5749 to lobby for a project to extend the expressway to Rosario, as a means to boost trade, tourism, and reduce travel times in the provinces of Tarlac, Eastern Pangasinan, and La Union. This lobbying led the Arroyo administration in October 2006 to announce a ten-year plan to extend the North Luzon Expressway (NLEX) from Mabalacat, Pampanga, to Rosario, La Union, and extend the South Luzon Expressway (SLEX) from Calamba, Laguna, to Lucena in Quezon, and eventually to Matnog, Sorsogon. In 2008, the SCTEX was formally opened, setting the stage for developing the TPLEX, which would extend beyond the SCTEX's terminus in Tarlac City. The initial construction plan for the TPLEX called for it to be implemented in two phases: The first phase would involve constructing two lanes, with the second phase expanding it to four lanes to accommodate 25,000 vehicles.

The proposed superhighway would be built parallel to MacArthur Highway, passing through the city of Tarlac and the municipalities of La Paz, Gerona, Victoria, Pura, Anao, and Ramos in Tarlac, Nampicuan and Cuyapo in Nueva Ecija, Rosales, Villasis, Urdaneta, Binalonan, Laoac, Pozorrubio, and Sison in Pangasinan, and Rosario, La Union.

Development stage	Tollway alignment
Phase 1	Tarlac City, Tarlac, to Rosales, Pangasinan
Phase 2	Rosales, Pangasinan, to Urdaneta City, Pangasinan
Phase 3	Urdaneta City, Pangasinan, to Rosario, La Union
Extension	Rosario, La Union, to San Fernando, La Union

The financing, design, construction, operation, and maintenance of the Tarlac–La Union Toll Expressway Phase 1 was eventually awarded to Private Infra Dev Corporation (now SMC TPLEX Corporation).

==== Project financing ====
Three local banks undertook financing the TPLEX: BDO Unibank, Development Bank of the Philippines, and Land Bank of the Philippines. This made TPLEX notable in the Infrastructure and Development Financing industry as "the first Public-Private Partnership project in the Philippines to feature an all-domestic cast of sponsors and lenders.” London-based Project Finance Magazine named the TPLEX as its "Asia Pacific Transport Deal of the Year" for 2011.

The project is being implemented through public-private partnership using the build–operate–transfer (BOT) scheme in which the project proponent is responsible to design, finance and build the initial two-lane expressway. As each section is completed, it is turned over to the government, which then grants the proponent a franchise to operate and maintain the toll road, after which the proponent, once the Toll Regulatory Board issues a toll operation certificate, operates the road under a long term concession agreement with the government.

=== Development disputes ===
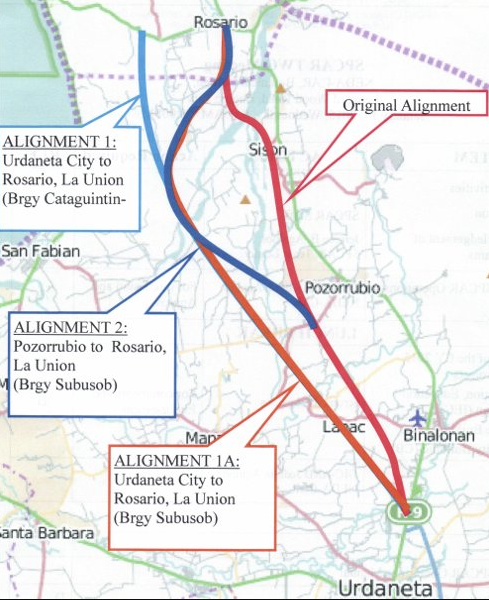
Alignment dispute over San Fabian and Pozorrubio routes, both in Pangasinan

==== Land acquisition ====
In the early development of the project, acquisition of rights of way (ROW) contributed to delays. With the TPLEX identified as a high priority government project, the Department of Public Works and Highways (DPWH) was tasked with acquiring the rights of way for the project's proposed alignment, and was allocated ₱793 million (US$16.6 million) in hope that the process could be expedited. However, legal disputes that had arisen regarding affected properties, notably in the Tarlac segment of the project, meant delays in negotiations undertaken by the DPWH.

==== Alignment of the Rosario interchange ====
The expected completion of the entire expressway caused a major delay when an unsolicited proposal was brought up to change the alignment of the project to change the location of the final interchange in Rosario, La Union. Former Pangasinan 5th District Representative Mark Cojuangco proposed three alignments: one would pass through Urdaneta City, then San Fabian, and exits Brgy. Cataguintingan of Rosario, La Union. This is about 1.48 kilometers (0.92 mi) longer from the original TPLEX terminus at barangay Subusob, Rosario. The second proposal will also pass through San Fabian but will end at the original TPLEX end at barangay Subusob. The first two proposals skips Pozorrubio. The third proposal will pass through Pozorrubio, San Fabian, and then end at barangay Subusub. All proposals intend to skip the municipality of Sison. The Cordillera Administrative Region Development Council has rejected the idea. The target completion date had been moved from the end of April 2017 to the end of April 2018.

=== Phases 1 and 2 ===
The first phase of the Tarlac-La Union Expressway started construction in January 27, 2010 which established the expressway's right-of-way marking the start of its existence. In April 2013, San Miguel Corporation announced that the segment from Tarlac City up to Urdaneta would be built with four lanes, instead of the initial plan of two lanes only. However, this also pushed back the opening day of the expressway from June 2013 to November 2013.

On October 25, 2013, the Toll Regulatory Board authorized the issuance of the Toll Operation Permit for the Tarlac City–Pura segment of the TPLEX after the construction of that segment was completed by Private Infra Development Corporation (PIDC), the all-Filipino consortium backed by conglomerates San Miguel Corporation (SMC) and DMCI Holdings, Inc.

This first phase, referred to as section 1A, begins with a connection to SCTEX, then stretches 17 kilometers (11 miles) from Tarlac City to Victoria, and then to Pura, Tarlac. On December 23, 2013, the expressway opened up to Ramos, Tarlac, bringing TPLEX up to 23 kilometers (14 mi) of its operational length, and was officially opened by President Benigno Aquino III. On April 16, 2014, phase 1 of the project was completed when the Rosales section was opened. In December 2014, phase 2 of the project, covering 13.72 kilometers (8.53 mi) from Carmen to Urdaneta, was opened to traffic, as what PIDC president Mark Dumol had announced on the day the completion of phase 1 was announced.

=== Phase 3 ===
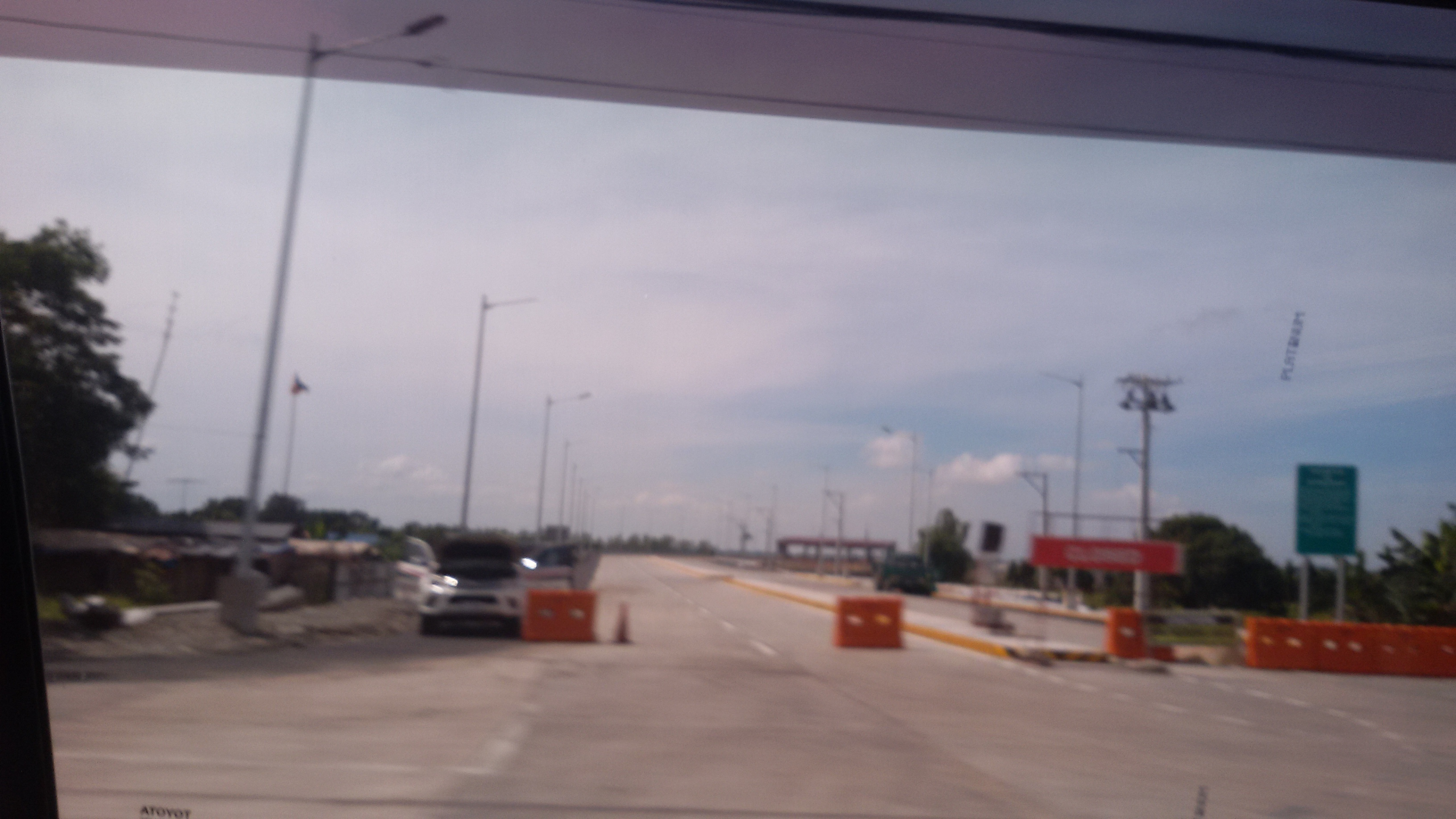
Pozorrubio Interchange under construction in Manila North Road in the town of Pozorrubio, Pangasinan

Executive Secretary Salvador Medialdea leads the inauguration of TPLEX's Rosario Exit. Joining him were Finance Secretary Carlos Dominguez III and Transportation Secretary Arthur Tugade.

In December 2014, Dumol projected that the last section, covering 25.83 kilometers (16.05 mi) from Urdaneta to Rosario and including an exit in Pozorrubio, would be completed some time in 2015. However, there were delays in the implementation of the project, which included a highly disputed proposal to divert the exit 7 kilometers (4.3 miles) away to San Fabian in Pangasinan. The DPWH and the PIDC announced in July 2015 that they will continue to follow the original plan for the last phase exiting in Rosario, adding that this last phase would be completed by the following year, 2016.

This development phase was further subdivided into phase 3A, from Urdaneta to Pozorrubio, and phase 3B, Pozorrubio to Rosario. Section 3A would include trumpet-type interchanges at Binalonan and Pozorrubio, while section 3B include an interchange at Sison and the roundabout-style terminus interchange in Rosario, La Union.

After the opening of the exit at Pozorrubio in December 2017, the DPWH said segment 3B from Pozorrubio to Rosario is expected to be completed in June 2019. By mid-August 2016, the first exit of section 3A, at Binalonan Exit, had been opened to the driving public. By December 6, 2017, the last exit of section 3A, at Pozorrubio, Pangasinan, had been opened to the driving public. In September 2016, DPWH said this exit of section 3A, which covers the 7.53 kilometers (4.68 mi). from Binalonan to Pozorrubio, was supposed to open in December 2016. The Binalonan to Pozorrubio section was expected to open around October 27, 2017, but the section did not open on that date due to the minor right-of-way issues on the missing 1-kilometer (0.62 mi) fence.

By July 15, 2020, the Pozorrubio to Rosario segment of the expressway opened to motorists, with the exception of the Sison exit, which was still under construction as the main carriageway opened.

== Future ==
=== Extension to San Juan ===
As a part of the project of increasing the 200-kilometer (120 mi) radius of High Standard Highways of the Japan International Cooperation Agency (JICA) into a 300-kilometer (190 mi) radius from Metro Manila, the expressway would have extended to the city of San Fernando, La Union. There are also plans to move the extension terminus to San Juan, La Union and will be divided into three segments, namely:

Segment	Coverage	Kilometers
Segment 1	Rosario to Tubao	18
Segment 2	Tubao to Naguilian	23
Segment 3	Naguilian to San Juan	18.4

In June 2023, the NEDA-ICC approved the project with a total cost of ₱23.4 billion, and it would be funded through a PPP scheme. In November of that year, the government opened a bidding for a comparative proposal as the Swiss challenge was greenlighted by the DPWH, and was originally scheduled to award the contract by March or May 2024.

On June 3, 2024, San Miguel Holdings Corporation (SMHC) was given the contract to design, finance, construct, operate, and maintain the extension project. On July 10 of the same year, President Bongbong Marcos signed a concession agreement with DPWH and SMC, and Segment 1 was expected to be operational by 2028. DPWH secretary Manuel Bonoan said that San Miguel and the government agency could now proceed with the detailed engineering design and right-of-way acquisition after signing the contract for the 59.4-kilometer (36.9 mi) extension.

Construction is set to start in 2027 and is expected to be completed by 2030. As of 2026, the SMC is currently working with local assessors on the right of way activities.

=== Laoag extension ===
On June 11, 2013, at the San Miguel Corporation annual stockholders meeting, Chairman Eduardo Cojuangco Jr. revealed plans to extend the expressway north to Laoag, Ilocos Norte. He said that extending the toll road to Laoag had been raised during the Arroyo administration. In 2018, SMC submitted a proposal to extend the expressway to Ilocos, and two years later, Ang said that the extension would lead to Laoag, with a route of 214 kilometers. In 2023, Chinese firm CCCC was in talks with President Marcos to build a highway from Laoag to Rosario for 270 kilometers.

=== Pangasinan Link Expressway (PLEX) ===
On March 21, 2024, San Miguel Holdings Corporation president and CEO Ramon Ang and Pangasinan’s provincial government officials led by Governor Ramon Guico III unveiled the historical marker for the ₱34 billion 42.76 kilometers (26.57 mi) "Pangasinan Link Expressway" project during the groundbreaking ceremony after signing the joint venture and tollway concession agreements for its construction. PLEX connects to TPLEX and provide access to New Manila International Airport. The three sections of PLEX Phase 1 include: the 7 km (4.3 mi) stretch from Binalonan to Manaoag, the 11.3 km (7.0 mi) stretch from Manaoag to Calasiao, the 22.1 km (13.7 mi) stretch from Calasiao to Lingayen, and a 2.4 km (1.5 mi) spur road in Calasiao.

== Toll ==
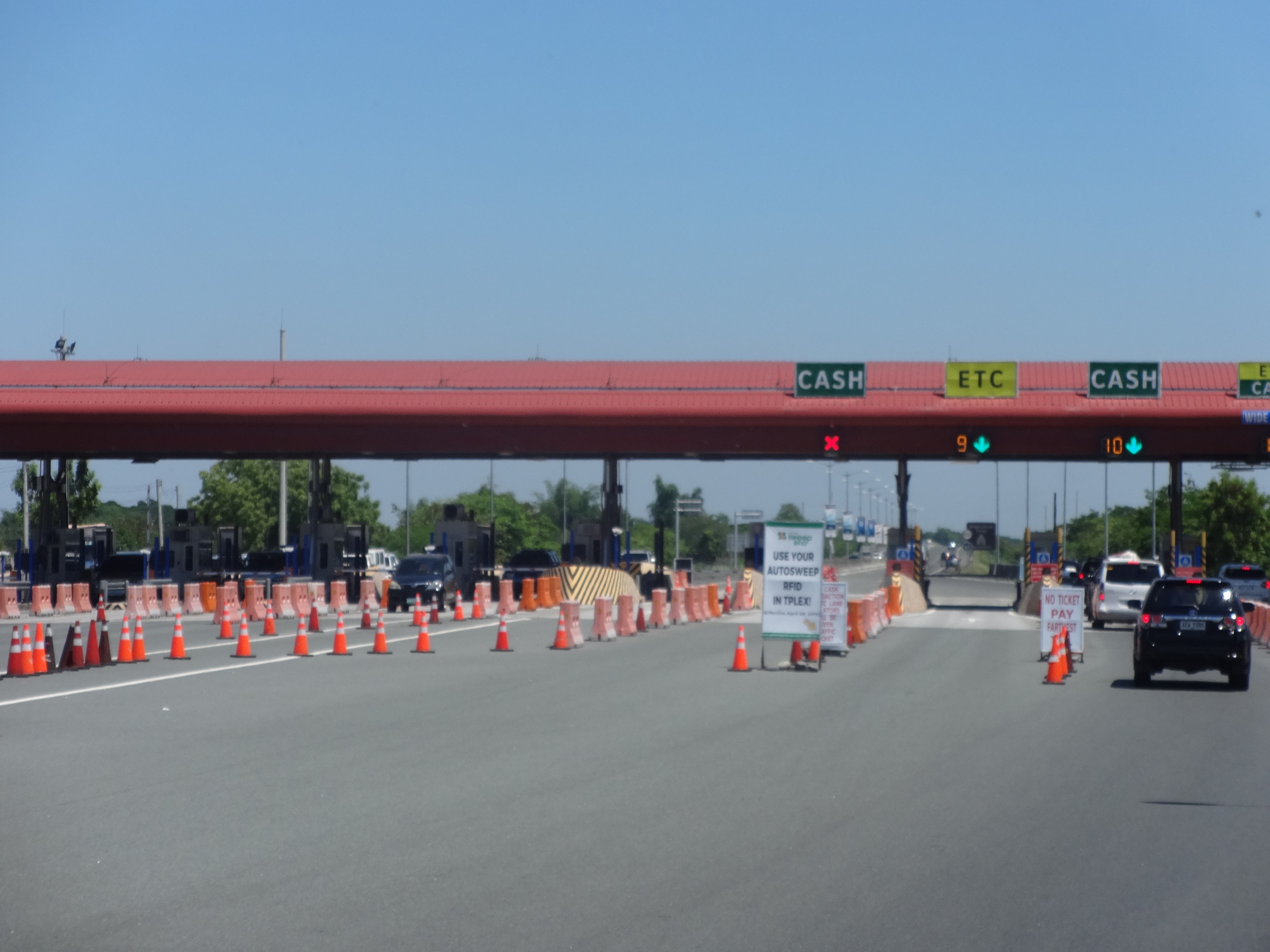
Tarlac Central Toll Plaza

The Tarlac–Pangasinan–La Union Expressway uses a closed road tolling system where motorists pay tolls according to vehicle class and distance travelled. On April 8, 2019, the Autosweep electronic toll collection (ETC) system, an RFID enhanced toll system, was implemented at TPLEX. This ensures interoperability with other SMC-operated tollways and those of MPTC's such as NLEX and SCTEX.

Class	Toll
Class 1 (cars, motorcycles, SUVs, jeepneys)	₱3.50/km
Class 2 (buses, light trucks)	₱8.70/km
Class 3 (heavy trucks)	₱10.50/km

== Rest areas ==
Petron serves as the primary service station brand along the expressway. Both Petron and expressway operator SMC Infrastructure are subsidiaries of San Miguel Corporation.

The main service complexes are located at Kilometer 134 in both the northbound and southbound directions in Tarlac, serving the municipalities of Victoria and Pura.

=== Facilities and dining ===
Both the northbound and southbound complexes at Kilometer 134 feature:

- Fuel Services: Petron fuel bays offering gasoline, diesel, and lubricant products.
- Electric Vehicle Charging: EV charging stations equipped with AC and DC fast-charging capabilities.
- Dining and Food Outlets: A wide selection of quick-service restaurants, fast-food chains, and coffee shops, including:
  - Jollibee
  - Chowking
  - Army Navy
  - Starbucks
- Convenience and Retail: Petron Treats convenience stores carrying travel essentials, snacks, and beverages.
- Amenities: Air-conditioned restrooms, spacious parking bays, travel information bays, and emergency roadside assistance areas.

== Exits ==
Exits are numbered by kilometer posts, with Rizal Park in Manila designated as kilometer zero. Exits start at 122 because SCTEX is connected with TPLEX. Thus, the last exit of the SCTEX will be succeeded by an exit in the TPLEX.

Region	Province	City/Municipality	km	mi	Exit	Name	Destinations	Notes
Central Luzon	Tarlac	Tarlac City			Southern terminus (SCTEX-TPLEX boundary) simultaneously with a ramp to Cabanatuan-bound CLLEX and before Cut Cut Bridge; continues south to Manila as E1 (Subic–Clark–Tarlac Expressway)			
Central Luzon	Tarlac	Tarlac City	122	76	122	CLLEX / Tarlac City	N58 (Santa Rosa–Tarlac Road) / N308 (CLLEX) – Tarlac City, La Paz, Santa Rosa, Cabanatuan	Hybrid trumpet and diamond interchange; southbound exit and northbound entrance
Central Luzon	Tarlac	Tarlac City	124	77	124	Tarlac City (La Paz)	N58 (Santa Rosa—Tarlac Road) – Tarlac City, La Paz, Santa Rosa, Cabanatuan	Right-in/right-out exit and entrance at southbound
Central Luzon	Tarlac	Tarlac City	126	78	Tarlac Central toll plaza			
Central Luzon	Tarlac	Tarlac City				NALEX		Connects with the future Northern Access Link Expressway towards New Manila International Airport; southbound exit and northbound entrance
Central Luzon	Tarlac	Victoria	131.062	81.438	131	Victoria (Talavera)	Tarlac—Victoria Road — Victoria, Talavera	Trumpet interchange
Central Luzon	Tarlac	Victoria	134	83	Petron KM 134 (northbound)			
Central Luzon	Tarlac	Victoria	134	83	Petron KM 134 (southbound)			
Central Luzon	Tarlac	Gerona			No major junctions			
Central Luzon	Tarlac	Pura	139.079	86.420	139	Pura (Gerona)	Gerona—Guimba Road — Pura, Gerona, Guimba, Muñoz, Talugtug, San Jose, Cagayan Valley	Trumpet interchange
Central Luzon	Tarlac	Ramos	145.01	90.11	145	Ramos (Paniqui)	Paniqui—Ramos Road — Paniqui, Ramos	Trumpet interchange
Central Luzon	Tarlac	Paniqui			No major junctions			
Central Luzon	Tarlac	Anao	150.722	93.654	150	Anao (Moncada)	Moncada—Anao Road — Anao, Moncada, Nampicuan, Cuyapo	Trumpet interchange; former northern terminus (2013–2014)
Central Luzon	Nueva Ecija	Nampicuan			No major junctions			
Central Luzon	Nueva Ecija	Cuyapo			No major junctions			
Ilocos Region	Pangasinan	Rosales	169.388	105.253	169	Rosales (Villasis)	Rosales Access Road – Rosales, San Manuel, Villasis, Santo Tomas, San Carlos	Trumpet interchange; access to N2 (Manila North Road) and also Cagayan Valley via N114 (Pangasinan–Nueva Vizcaya Road)
Ilocos Region	Pangasinan	Rosales	169.388	105.253	Carmen Toll Plaza (2014, demolished)			
Ilocos Region	Pangasinan	Rosales	171.5	106.6		Carmen	N56 (Carmen–Poblacion Rosales Road)	Half diamond interchange (2014–2016)
Ilocos Region	Pangasinan	Rosales – Villasis boundary	171.7– 172.7	106.7– 107.3	Agno Viaduct over the Agno River			
Ilocos Region	Pangasinan	Urdaneta	184.29	114.51	184	Urdaneta (Dagupan)	N2 (Manila North Road) – Urdaneta, Dagupan	Trumpet interchange; former northern terminus (2014–2017)
Ilocos Region	Pangasinan	Binalonan			No major junctions			
Ilocos Region	Pangasinan	Laoac	189	117	189	Binalonan (Manaoag Church)	N210 (Binalonan–Dagupan Highway) – Binalonan, Laoac, Manaoag	Trumpet interchange; access to Manaoag Church
Ilocos Region	Pangasinan	Pozorrubio	199	124	199	Pozorrubio (San Jacinto)	N2 (Manila North Road) – Pozorrubio, San Jacinto	Trumpet interchange; former northern terminus (2017–2020)
Ilocos Region	Pangasinan	Sison	205	127	205	Sison	N2 (Manila North Road) – Sison	Trumpet interchange
Ilocos Region	Pangasinan	Sison	207.26– 208	128.79– 129	Bued Viaduct over the Bued River			
Ilocos Region	La Union	Rosario	210	130	Rosario toll plaza			
Ilocos Region	La Union	Rosario	211	131		Rosario	N2 (Manila North Road) – San Fernando, San Juan, Vigan, Laoag, Pagudpud N54 (Kennon Road) – Baguio	Roundabout interchange; northern end of R-8 concurrency. Current northern terminus.
Ilocos Region	La Union	Santo Tomas			No major junctions			
Ilocos Region	La Union	Tubao				Tubao	N208 (Aspiras–Palispis Highway) – Tubao, Agoo, Pugo, Baguio	Trumpet interchange
Ilocos Region	La Union	Aringay			No major junctions			
Ilocos Region	La Union	Caba			No major junctions			
Ilocos Region	La Union	Bauang				Naguilian	N54 (Naguilian Road) – Naguilian, Burgos, Baguio	Trumpet interchange
Ilocos Region	La Union	San Fernando				San Fernando City	San Fernando, Bauang	Trumpet interchange
Ilocos Region	La Union	San Juan				San Juan	N2 (Manila North Road) – San Juan	Trumpet interchange; future northern terminus
1.000 mi = 1.609 km; 1.000 km = 0.621 mi: Closed/former; Concurrency terminus; Incomplete access; Tolled; Unopened
