= Bust of Ferdinand Marcos =

Destroyed Ferdinand Marcos monument in Benguet, Philippines

- The bust in 1989 prior to its destruction
- Interactive map of Bust of Ferdinand Marcos
- Location: Mount Shontoug, Aspiras–Palispis Highway, Taloy Sur, Tuba, Benguet, Philippines
- Coordinates: 16°21′13″N 120°29′24″E
- Material: concrete
- Height: 30 m (98 ft)
- Beginning date: 1978
- Completion date: 1980
- Dedicated to: Ferdinand Marcos
- Dismantled date: December 29, 2002

The bust of Ferdinand Marcos along the Aspiras–Palispis Highway in Tuba, Benguet, Philippines, was a 30-meter (98 ft) concrete monument of former Philippine President, dictator and kleptocrat Ferdinand Marcos. The monument became a subject of controversy as its construction displaced indigenous Ibaloi residents in the sparsely populated area, and Ibaloi residents were reportedly forced to sell their ancestral land at very low prices. The monument was destroyed in December 2002, with the New People's Army, the armed wing of the Communist Party of the Philippines, taking credit for its destruction.

== Bust ==
The hollow bust measured 30 metres (98 ft) high and was made of concrete.

== History ==
=== Construction ===
Around 1978, the bust's construction began along Aspiras–Palispis Highway, then called Marcos Highway. The bust was constructed by the Philippine Tourism Authority and was meant to be the centerpiece of the 300-hectare (740-acre) Marcos Park that would include a golf course, sports club, convention center, and hotel. The bust was positioned near the peak of Mt. Shontoug so it could be seen by Baguio-bound motorists as far as 3 kilometres (1.9 mi) away from the monument. Sculptor Anselmo B. Dayag who built the Eagle of the North (Agoo, La Union) and Lion's Head (Kennon Road, Baguio) was chosen to design and carve the bust. Dayag died right before completing the bust, as did another sculptor who was hired by Dayag's family to take over the project. Prior to the sculptors' demise, scaffolding covered with plywood was reportedly erected to deliberately hide the bust's construction from the public. A typhoon later blew the scaffolding away, exposing the bust.

=== Displacement of Ibaloi ===
The Ibaloi in the affected area were said to have been displaced due to the bust's construction, having been forced to sell their lands for outrageously low prices. The bust was completed around 1980.

After the People Power Revolution of 1986, the Ibaloi peoples slaughtered a pig and carabao and poured the animals' blood into the bust to "exorcise" it and later filed a case to reclaim their land.

In 2001, the Philippine Tourism Authority sued the Ibaloi who had reoccupied their ancestral lands, claiming rights over Marcos Park. The Supreme Court upheld the Ibaloi's rights to the land in a decision released in 2007.

=== Destruction ===
The bust was bombed in 1989 by leftist rebels, who managed to blast a hole in the bust's left ear.

The bust was destroyed using dynamite before dawn on December 29, 2002, by suspected treasure hunters who thought that the bust contained parts of the rumored Yamashita treasure. Benguet Governor Raul Mencio Molintas said that the police learned that a white Toyota FX van was around the area prior to the incident. It was initially thought that the New People's Army was behind the bombing of the monument. The rebel group's Chadli Molintas Command claimed responsibility for the incident in a press release a day later. The communists said that the bust's mere existence "is a mockery of justice and a betrayal of the will of the people. ... Let the ruins be an ugly reminder that the Marcoses have yet to pay for their crimes."

Some critics of Marcos criticized the destruction of the monument. Archbishop Oscar Cruz of Lingayen-Dagupan said that the perpetrators "should have never destroyed the monument to evil in this country", describing the bust as "a monument to evil, warning people never to become what this man was".

=== Protests ===
The location of the bust has been the site of protests against the Marcos family. Before the bust was erected in 1978, protests were held to oppose land grabbing of Ibaloi ancestral lands under the Marcos dictatorship.

In 2016, protesters gathered to denounce the dictatorship of the Marcos family during martial law and Bongbong Marcos's candidacy for vice president. In 2021, the Cordillera Peoples Alliance and the Campaign Against the Return of the Marcoses and Martial Law unveiled banners bearing the words "Marcos No Hero", "The North Resists", and "No to Duterte Marcos 2022" in reference to Bongbong Marcos's candidacy for the Philippine presidency.

== Public perception ==
The bust was subjected to controversy and was viewed as self-glorification, especially by critics of the Marcos administration. The displaced Ibalois viewed it as a symbol of their mistrust for government authorities since the construction of the bust displaced them from their lands. Communist insurgents also criticized the bust's construction, and many groups planned to destroy the bust.

== Rehabilitation ==
In 2003, Baguio city mayor Ramon Labo Jr. made an offer to the Marcos family to restore the bust. Imelda Marcos, the widow of Ferdinand Marcos, treated the offer as a kind gesture, but stated that any move to fix the monument should be a "collective decision of the Marcoses and their supporters". Marcos' son, Bongbong Marcos (who would later be the Philippines' 17th president), said the family did not feel the need to have the bust fixed despite the offer.

== See also ==
- Daytoy ni Bannawag – An earlier statue and memorial dedicated to Ferdinand Marcos established in 1977.
- Lion's Head
