= Loakan Road =

Road in Baguio, Philippines

Coordinates: 16°22′43″N 120°32′29″E

Loakan Road

Route information
- Length: 6.2 km (3.9 mi)
- Component highways: N231

Major junctions
- North end: N231 (Upper Session Road)
- N232 (Major Mane Road)
- South end: N54 (Kennon Road)

Location
- Country: Philippines
- Provinces: Benguet
- Major cities: Baguio

Highway system
- Roads in the Philippines; Highways; Expressways; List

The Loakan Road is a 6.2-kilometer (3.9 mi), major road in Baguio, Philippines. It provides access to Loakan Airport located in the outskirts of the city. The entire road forms part of National Route 231 (N231) of the Philippine highway network.

In popular culture, the road is considered by paranormal believers to be haunted, by a female vanishing hitchhiker who was said to be a rape victim.

== See also ==
- Highways in the Philippines
