= N54 =

N54 may refer to:

- N54 (Long Island bus)
- BMW N54, an automobile engine
- Governor Pack Road, in the Philippines
- N54 road (Ireland)
