= Thomas Henry Barry =

United States Army general

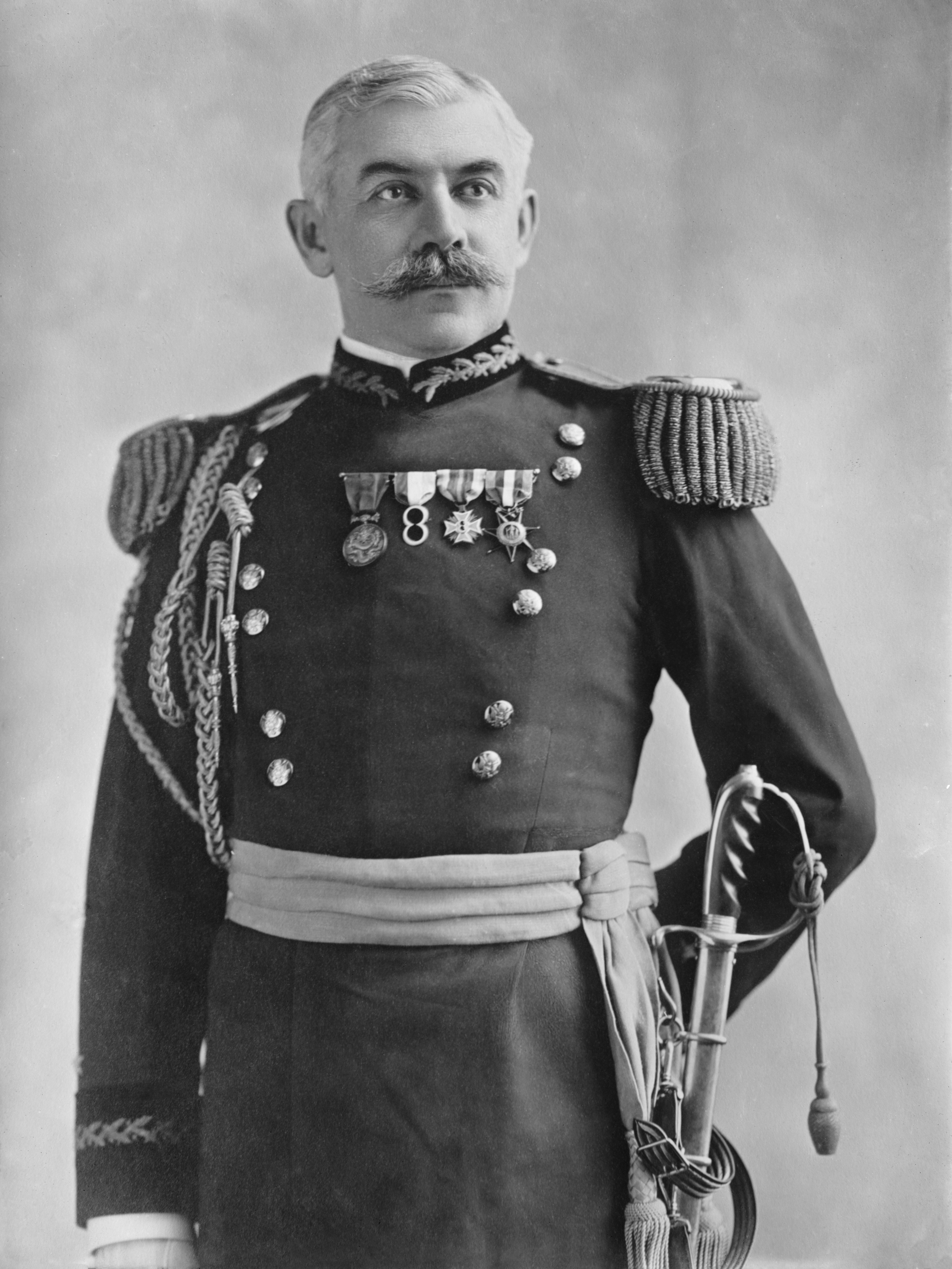
- Born: October 13, 1855; New York, New York, US
- Died: December 30, 1919 (aged 64); Washington, D.C., US
- Military career
- Branch: United States Army
- Service years: 1877–1919
- Rank: Major General
- Unit: Cavalry Branch
- Commands: President of the Army War College; Superintendent of the United States Military Academy; Department of the East; Philippine Department; 86th Division
- Conflicts: Spanish–American War; Philippine–American War; Russo-Japanese War; World War I
- Awards: Army Distinguished Service Medal; Silver Star

Thomas Henry Barry (October 13, 1855 – December 30, 1919) was a major general of the United States Army who served in many conflicts throughout his military career but is perhaps best known as being superintendent of the United States Military Academy from 1910 to 1912.

== Early life ==
Barry was born in a small frame house at 24 Thames Street, near Trinity Place, in Lower Manhattan. He played baseball in Battery Park as a young boy. He received his early education in the public schools and the Free Academy of the City of New York. He graduated from West Point in 1877.

== Military career ==
Barry was assigned as a second lieutenant to the 7th Cavalry Regiment on June 14, 1877. In 1880 he was transferred to the 1st Infantry. He was appointed Assistant Adjutant General of the army in 1893. He was a Lieutenant Colonel during the Spanish–American War. He was also Adjutant General of the 8th Army Corps during the war. He was appointed Brigadier General of volunteers after a brief period as Adjutant General of the army. As a brigadier general of volunteers he served in the China Relief Expedition and in the Philippine–American War during 1900–1901. He became a brigadier general in August 1903 and, at the start of the Russo-Japanese War of 1904–1905, he was assigned to the Imperial Russian Army as a military observer. From 1905 to 1907, Barry served as the third president of the United States Army War College.

In 1907, he was chosen as commander for the Army of Cuban Occupation and Pacification by President Theodore Roosevelt. He was promoted to Major General on April 29, 1908. He became Superintendent of the United States Military Academy on August 31, 1910. He was succeeded by Clarence Page Townsley as Superintendent of the Academy on August 31, 1912. He was assigned to command the Eastern Division of the US Army for the next two years. In 1914 he was sent to the Philippines and China as commander of all the American troops. During World War I he commanded the 86th Division, an all-draftee formation, from 1917 to 1918 but did not lead the division overseas. He then served as commander of the Central Department from Mar. 21, 1918 to January 14, 1919. Following a sudden death of Major General J. Franklin Bell on January 8, 1919, Barry was ordered back to the headquarters of Department of the East at Governors Island, New York where he once served in 1913 and assumed duty as commanding general. He was retired on October 13, 1919.

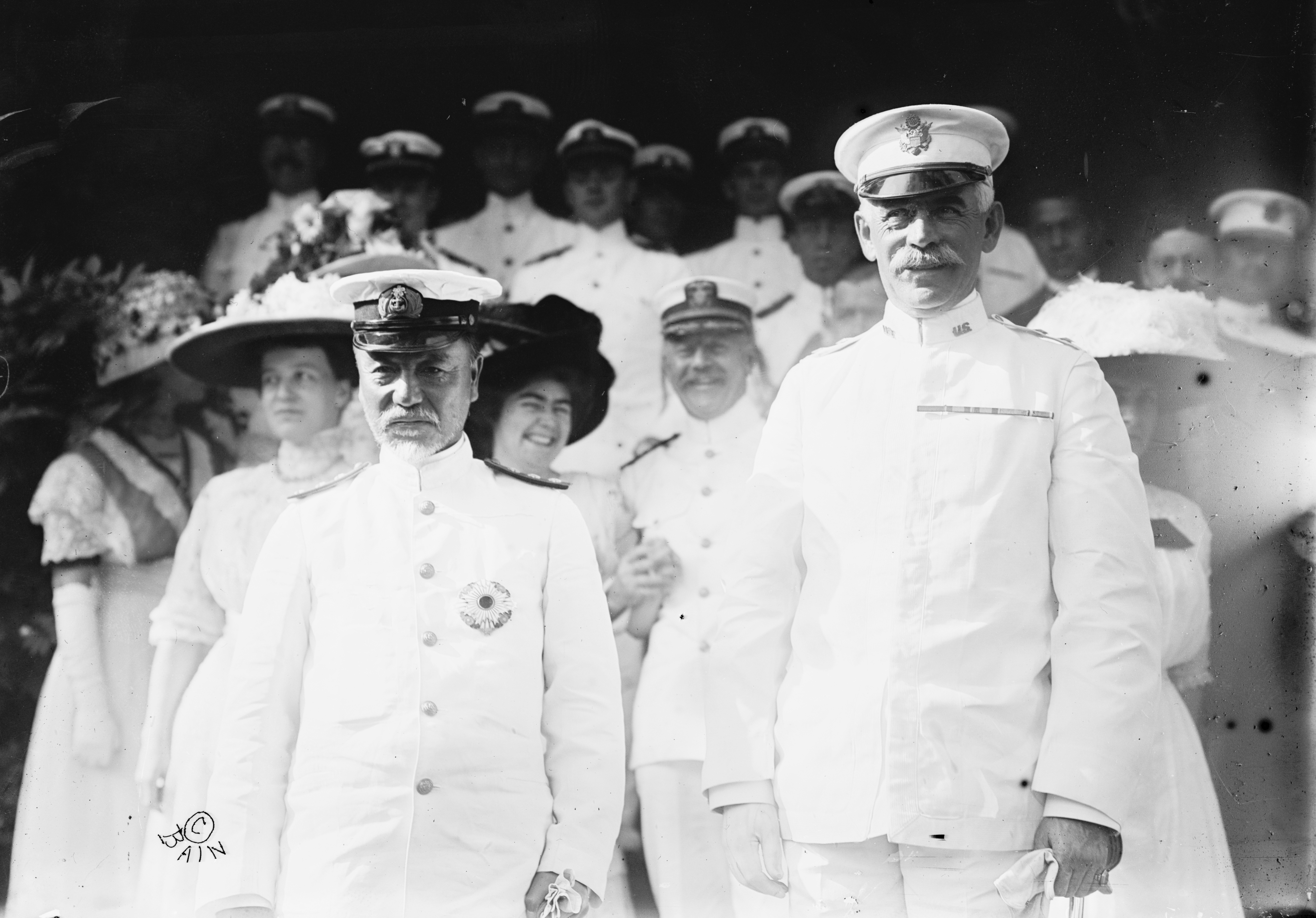
Major General Thomas Henry Barry (right) with Admiral Togo Heihachiro on 12 August 1911.

== Memberships ==
General Barry was a member of the Military Order of the Dragon and the Order of the Indian Wars of the United States.

== Death ==
Barry died of uremic poisoning as the result of Bright's disease at Walter Reed Army Medical Center on December 30, 1919. He had been ill for three weeks.

== Family ==
In 1884, Barry married Ellen Bestor. Their children included Ellen (1885–1974), the wife of Major General William Bryden.

== Legacy ==
- Army transport Thomas H. Barry.

Military offices
Preceded by Hugh L. Scott	Superintendent of the United States Military Academy; 1910–1912	Succeeded by Clarence Page Townsley
Preceded by Newly activated organization	Commanding General 86th Division; August–November 1917	Succeeded by Lyman W. V. Kennon
Preceded by Lyman W. V. Kennon	Commanding General 86th Division; February–March 1918	Succeeded by Lyman W. V. Kennon
