= Lion's Head (Benguet) =

Attraction along Kennon Road, Luzon, Philippines

- The Lion's Head monument in 2015
- Interactive map of Lion's Head
- Location: Kennon Road, Camp 6; near the Baguio–Tuba boundary, Benguet, Philippines
- Coordinates: 16.367556°N 120.605899°E
- Material: Limestone
- Height: 40 ft (12 m)
- Beginning date: 1968
- Opening date: 1972
- Dedicated to: Lions Club

The Lion's Head (Tagalog: Ulo ng Leon) is a statue along Kennon Road, a major highway in Luzon, Philippines. Located in Camp 6 near the Baguio–Tuba boundary, the Lion's Head measures 40 ft (12 m) in height.

== Conception ==
It was conceptualized by the Lions Club members of Baguio, during the term of Luis Lardizabal as mayor of Baguio from 1969 to 1970 and as the club's president, to become the club's symbol or imprint in the area. Construction of the lion’s head began in 1971 under Baguio Lions Club President and later, District 301-C Governor Robert John Webber. They commissioned an Ifugao artist named Reynaldo Lopez Nanyac to carve out the lion’s head from a limestone boulder with a group of engineers and miners, then the "actual artistic carving of the façade" made by the late sculptor Anselmo B. Day-ag. Anselmo B. Day-ag carved into it a more realistic depiction of a lion’s head with a large mane and open mouth. The construction project began in 1968 but was interrupted. The project was continued in 1971 by another Lions Club president, Robert Webber, and was unveiled in 1972.

== Forerunners ==
The forerunner of the man-made Lion's Head was a "large rock" described to be "naturally shaped like a lion", which prior to 1972 was the landmark that tourists observe along Kennon Road towards Baguio. However, according to the article Lion's Head in Baguio City - Philippines, the current Lion's Head landmark was also a limestone naturally shaped like a "male lion, with a mane".

== Restoration ==
The statue has undergone several coloration changes before restoring it to acquiring its traditional gold and black color. It was at some points in time painted white and brown, or yellow. It had also undergone restoration after being damaged by vandalism and the 1990 Luzon earthquake.

== See also ==
- Bust of Ferdinand Marcos
- Eagle of the North
