= Seal of Baguio =

Official symbol of Baguio, Philippines

- Armiger: Baguio
- Adopted: 1948

The Seal of Baguio is one of the official symbols of Baguio, Philippines.

== Background ==
NHCP version of the seal.

The current seal of Baguio was adopted after its approval on August 26, 1948 by the Philippine Heraldry Committee.

It consist of a shield circumscribed by a ring. The shield is divided by a red diagonal line with four gold circles on it symbolizing four mining companies Itogon Suyoc Mines, Balatoc Mines, Benguet Consolidated (Baguio Gold, Benguet Exploration, Big Wedge and Atok Gold Demonstration) and Antamok Gold Fields. On the bottom left portion of the shield is the zigzag road while the top right features the Bridal Veil Falls which is situated in Tuba, Benguet. The landscape also features pine trees, which are defining flora of the city.

== 2026 proposal ==
Proposed "refined" seal of Baguio (2026).

On April 16, 2026, the Baguio city government started a design competition for a new city seal. It was open to Filipino citizens with preference for Baguio residents, students and alumni of Baguio schools, and members of the indigenous peoples of the Cordilleras. The winning design was by Joseph Norman Adefuin.

On November 16, 2026, during a public consultation the city government presented a modified version of the winning design.

The Baguio city government argues that the redesign is needed to fix inaccuracies such as removing the Bridal Veil Falls which is situated outside the city's boundaries, remove references to the mining companies which operated outside the city, and include symbol's reflecting the city's education, tourism, creative sectors and its Indigenous heritage.

The new seal received criticism with residents asking the necessity of the redesign and some finding its appearance as more suited for a tourism logo rather than a civic symbol.
