= Pugo–Rosario Road =

Major road in La Union, Philippines

Pugo–Rosario Road
- Rosario–Pugo Road
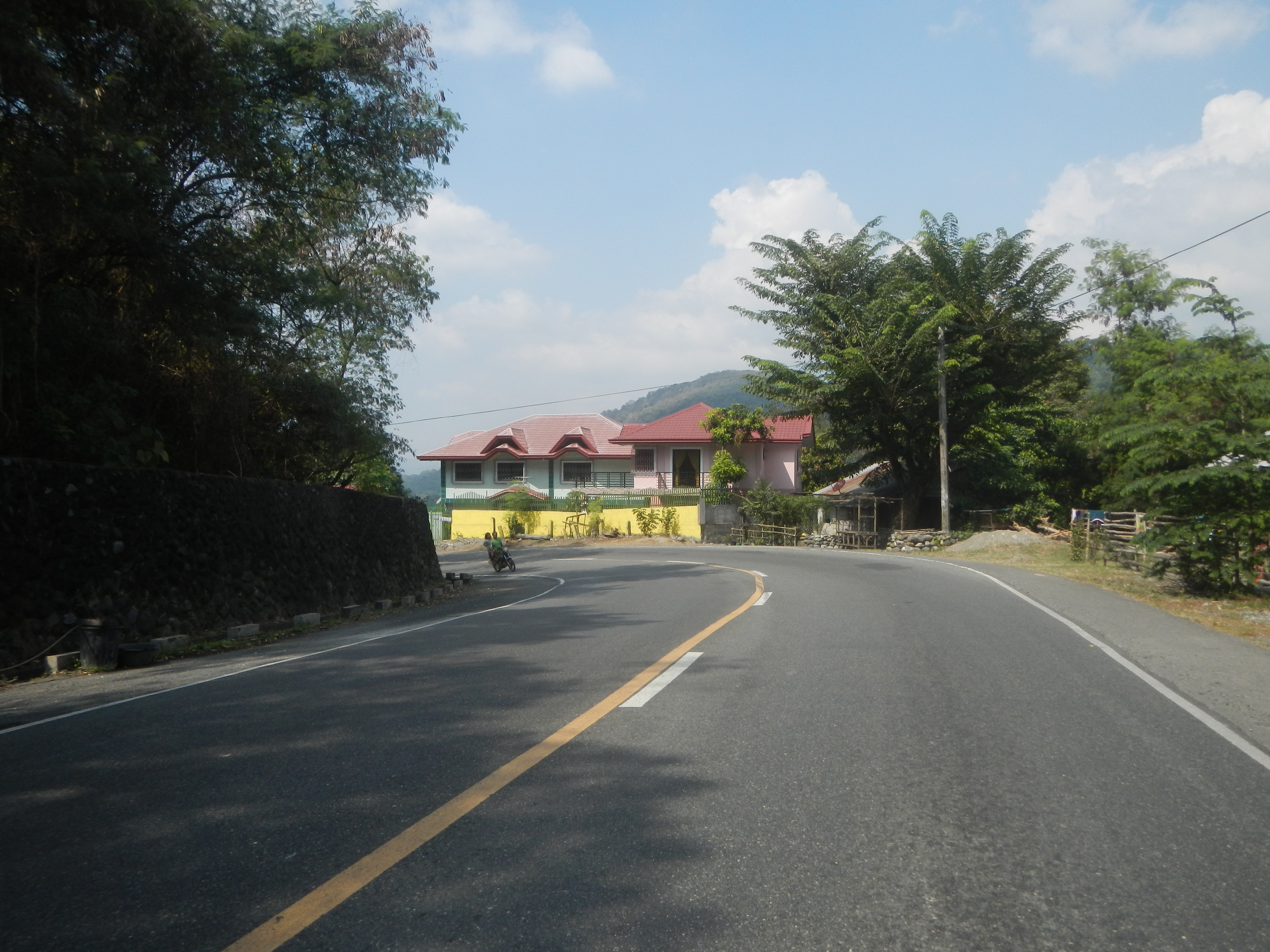
- Pugo–Rosario Road in Pugo, La Union

Route information
- Maintained by Department of Public Works and Highways
- Length: 13 km (8.1 mi) Approximate length
- Component highways: N209

Major junctions
- North end: N208 (Aspiras–Palispis Highway) in Pugo
- N209 (Estacio Street) in Rosario
- South end: N2 (Manila North Road) / E1 (TPLEX) in Rosario

Location
- Country: Philippines
- Provinces: La Union
- Towns: Pugo and Rosario

Highway system
- Roads in the Philippines; Highways; Expressways; List
← N208	→ N210

The Pugo–Rosario Road is a major road in La Union that connects from MacArthur Highway and Tarlac–Pangasinan–La Union Expressway in Rosario to the Aspiras–Palispis Highway in Pugo. It is the alternative route to Marcos Highway for motorists going to Pugo and Baguio.

The road forms part of National Route 209 (N209) of the Philippine highway network.

== Intersections ==
The entire route is located in La Union. Intersections are numbered by kilometer post, with the Rizal Park in Manila designated as Kilometer Zero.

City/Municipality	km	mi	Destinations	Notes
Pugo	227.9	141.6	N208 (Aspiras–Palispis Highway) – Agoo, Tuba, Baguio	Northern terminus. Continues north into Pugo town proper as Municipal Road.
Rosario	216.2	134.3	N209 (Estacio Street)	Access to Rosario Town Proper. Northern end of the Rosario–Pugo Channelization Road segment.
Rosario	217.8	135.3	N2 (Manila North Road) / E1 (TPLEX) – Dagupan, Manila	Southern terminus. Roundabout intersection.
1.000 mi = 1.609 km; 1.000 km = 0.621 mi
