= Clarence Page Townsley =

United States Army general (1855–1926)

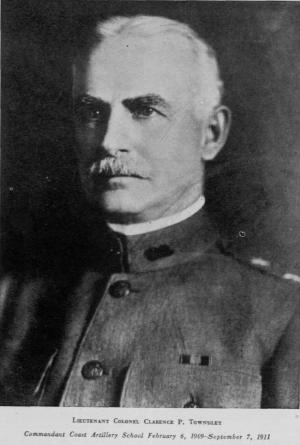
- Born: September 24, 1855; De Kalb, New York, U.S.
- Died: December 28, 1926 (aged 71); Washington, D.C., U.S.
- Burial place: West Point Cemetery, West Point, New York
- Military career
- Allegiance: United States of America
- Branch: United States Army
- Service years: 1881–1918
- Rank: Major General
- Units: United States Army Field Artillery Branch; United States Army Coast Artillery Corps
- Commands: Pensacola Coast Artillery District; U.S. Army Coast Artillery School; Superintendent of the United States Military Academy; 30th Division
- Conflicts: Spanish–American War; World War I

Clarence Page Townsley (September 24, 1855 – December 28, 1926) was a career United States Army officer who became Superintendent of the United States Military Academy.

== Early life ==
Clarence P. Townsley was born in De Kalb, New York, on September 24, 1855, a son of Elias P. Townsley and Louise (Thompson) Townsley. Townsley's grandfather Gideon had served as the town's postmaster, was elected town supervisor, and operated a tannery close to the Oswegatchie River. Townsley's father also served as postmaster and town supervisor, and was elected to the New York State Assembly.

In 1872, Townsley graduated from the State Normal School in Potsdam. He then attended Union College in Schenectady, New York, from which he graduated with a C.E degree in 1876. He spent a year in Sioux City, Iowa, working as a civil engineer on the Covington, Columbus and Black Hills Railroad. In July 1877 he was appointed to the United States Military Academy. Townsley graduated in 1881, ranked 14th of 53, and was appointed a second lieutenant of Field Artillery.

== Military career ==
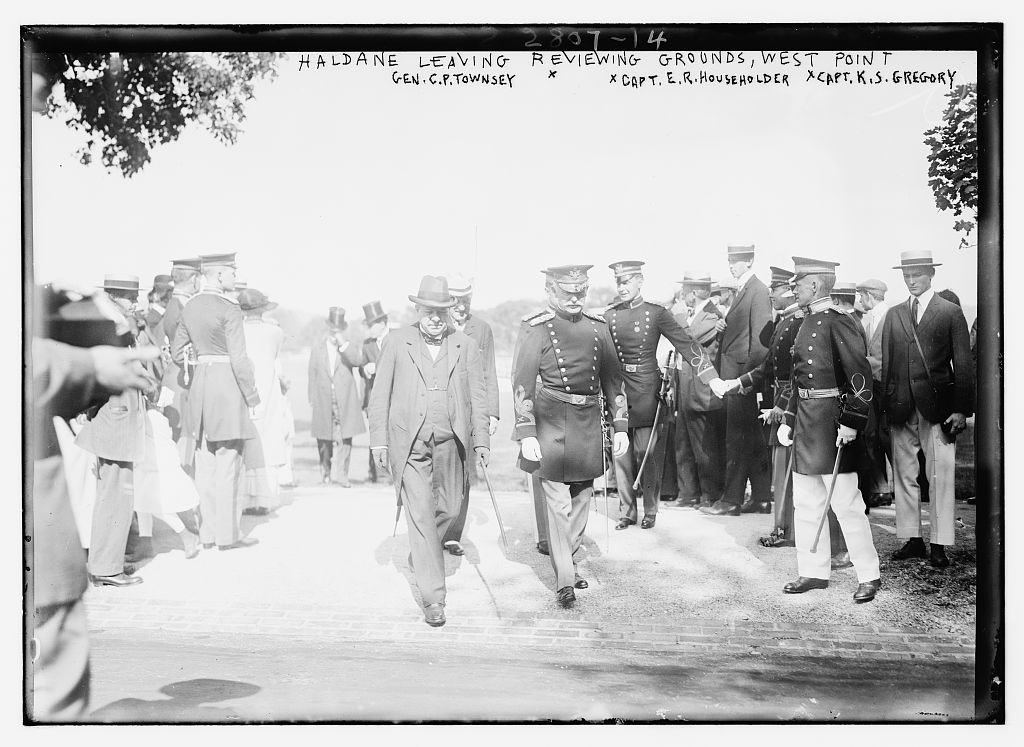
Richard Haldane leaving reviewing grounds with Clarence Page Townsley: Capt E.R Householder; Capt E.R. Gregory

Townsley served initially with the 4th Field Artillery Regiment. After a brief tour in California, Townsley returned to upstate New York, then to several Coast Artillery posts. He spent three years teaching drawing at West Point.

During the Spanish–American War, Townsley commanded the Ordnance office of 1st Division, Fourth Army Corps in Huntsville, Alabama, and then the Ordnance office for the Department of Havana, Cuba.

Townsley commanded the Coast Artillery District of Pensacola beginning in 1905. In 1909, he was promoted to lieutenant colonel and assigned to command the Coast Artillery School and the Artillery District of Chesapeake Bay.

In 1912, Townsley was appointed as superintendent of the United States Military Academy. He was still serving as West Point's superintendent at the outbreak of World War I, and continued in this post until July 1916, when he was promoted to brigadier general and returned to Coast Artillery duty. As the Army prepared for entry into the war, Townsley commanded the South Atlantic Coast Artillery District, then was assigned to the Philippines, where he inspected the artillery emplacements of Manila and Subic Bays.

Recalled to the United States to train and command the 30th Division, Townsley was promoted to temporary major general before leading his division to France. Townsley later returned to the United States because of illness, and was on medical leave at Walter Reed Hospital until just before the Armistice of 11 November 1918 that ended the war. He briefly commanded the North Pacific Coast Artillery District before retiring in December 1918.

Townsley died in Washington, D.C., on December 28, 1926. He was buried at West Point Cemetery in West Point, New York.

== Family ==
In 1891, Townsley married Marian Howland (1862-1925). They were the parents of three children, Marian (1891-1983), Helen Howland (1895-1990), and Clarence. Helen Townsley was the wife of Major General Leven Cooper Allen. Clarence P. Townsley Jr. (1896-1975) was a career officer in the U.S. Army and attained the rank of brigadier general.

== Notes ==
Military offices
Preceded by Thomas Henry Barry	Superintendents of the United States Military Academy; 1912–1916	Succeeded by John Biddle
