= Bridal Veil Falls (Tuba, Benguet) =

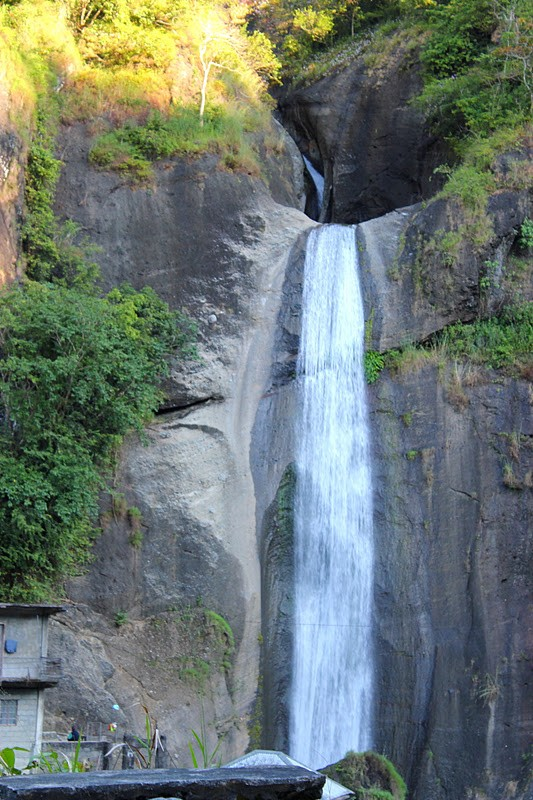

- Location within Luzon
- Location: Tuba, Benguet, Philippines
- Coordinates: 16°14′57.0″N 120°32′35.1″E
- Watercourse: Bued River

Bridal Veil Fall is a waterfall in Tuba, Benguet, Philippines.

== Background ==
The Bridal Veil Falls is a waterfall situated in the town of Tuba in Benguet province, specifically in Barangay Camp 1 in Sitio Taroy, which brought a considerable fortune to the folks living near the spring as sight seers become their costumers

In the 1920s, Frank G. Carpenter compares the water feature as "a bridal veil, draped a precipice several hundred feet high". He notes how the black rock behind the cascading water which follows the course of the Bued River is visible.

According to legends, the waterfall represents a bride's veil which was left by a woman who fled in defiance of her parents who wanter her to wed a man she did not love.

Located near the Kennon Road, it has became a tourist destination with locals servinng as sight seers four tourists wanting to get a view of the feature.

The waterfall is also featured in the Seal of Baguio, despite not being located within the city's boundaries.
