= Eagle of the North Park =

Monument and park in La Union, Philippines

- Giant Eagle of the North Park
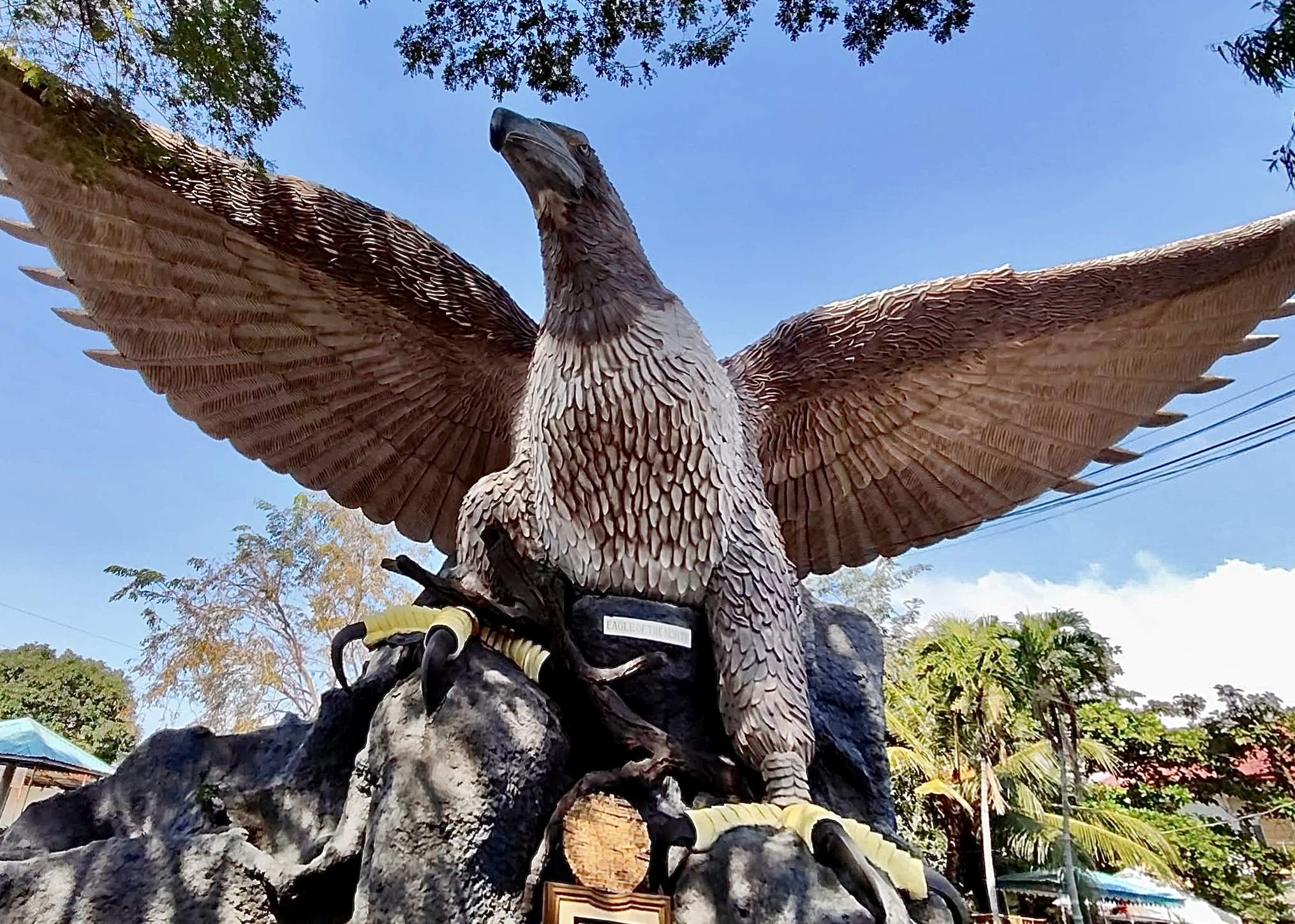
- Eagle of the North statue

- Location within Luzon Location within Philippines
- Location: Jose D. Aspiras Highway, Agoo, La Union, Philippines
- Coordinates: 16°19′48″N 120°22′05″E

The Giant Eagle of the North Park is a park and tourist attraction in Agoo, La Union, Philippines. Located along the Jose D. Aspiras Highway, the park features a concrete sculpture known as Eagle of the North by Anselmo Day-ag. The eagle sculpture is depicted with its wings spread as if it is preparing to take flight and symbolizes the influence of the Marcos family.
