= Lyman W. V. Kennon =

United States Army general (1858–1918)

Lyman Walter Vere Kennon
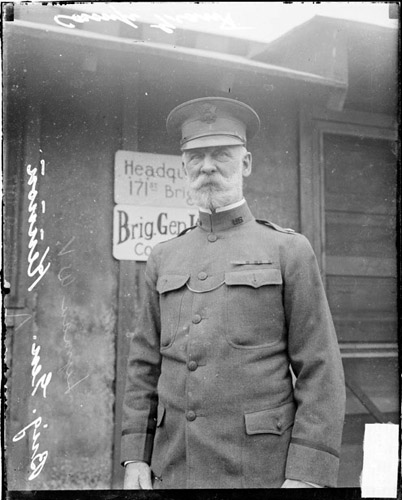
- Brig. Gen. Lyman W.V. Kennon at Camp Grant, Illinois – 1917
- Born: September 2, 1858; Providence, Rhode Island, US
- Died: September 9, 1918 (aged 60); New York City, US
- Burial place: Arlington National Cemetery
- Military career
- Allegiance: United States
- Branch: United States Army
- Service years: 1881–1918
- Rank: Brigadier General
- Commands: Company E, 6th U.S. Infantry; 25th Infantry Regiment; 86th Infantry Division; 161st Depot Brigade; 171st Infantry Brigade
- Conflicts: Indian Wars; Spanish–American War Battle of San Juan Hill; Philippine–American War; U.S.–Mexican Border War

Lyman Walter Vere Kennon (September 2, 1858 – September 9, 1918) was a career United States military officer in active service from 1881 to 1918, attaining the rank of brigadier general. During the Spanish–American War Kennon was in command of Company "E" 6th Infantry Regiment and was cited for bravery at San Juan Hill. He was most recognized for his 1903–1905 work with the Corps of Engineers to lead the building of the Benguet Road, a mountain highway in the Philippines linking Rosario, La Union and the lowland areas to Baguio. During World War I, he commanded the military training facility at Camp Greene, North Carolina; the 171st Infantry, Brigade, Camp Grant, Illinois, and then the 86th Division, Camp Grant, Illinois.

== Early life and education ==
Lyman Kennon was born September 2, 1858, in Providence, Rhode Island to Charles Henry Kennon and Adelaide (Hall) Kennon. He grew up in New York City when his mother was remarried to George G. Lambertson after his father, a Quartermaster Sergeant in Company D of the Rhode Island 2nd Cavalry Regiment during the American Civil War died May 23, 1863, at Brashear City, Louisiana. Lyman Kennon was admitted to the United States Military Academy at West Point, New York on June 14, 1876, but graduated 50th in a class of 52 with the Class of 1881 after being suspended for one year for hazing. In 1883, he married Anne Beecher Rice (1861–1945) of Goshen, Connecticut as he was beginning his military career. Later in his career, he attended the United States Army War College for graduate studies, graduating in 1910.

== Military career ==
Kennon's first posting upon graduation from West Point in 1881 was with the Cavalry, moving the Uinta Uncompahgre Ute Indians (fresh from a massacre a year earlier) to a newly established reservation.

As a junior lieutenant in 1884, he wrote a Manual of Duties of Guards and Sentinels which was the first such manual adopted by the Army. His 1886 article on "Battle Tactics of Infantry" was widely discussed here and abroad and led to the replacement of Upton's Military Tactics as Army doctrine. Numerous other publications followed, including a critique of the 1886 wholesale incarceration of the Chiricahua Apache tribe for the acts of a few warriors. "For the sins of these few," he wrote, "a sentence of banishment was visited upon the whole tribe. They were far from deserving it." After serving as aide to General George Crook upon his death in 1890, Kennon began service with the US Army Corps of Engineers, being sent to Central America in 1891 as engineer to survey a possible route for an inter-oceanic canal. While there, he surveyed Mexico's border with Guatemala, eventually carrying the survey around Guatemala until it reached the Nicaraguan border.

In the Spanish–American War, as commander of Company "E" the 6th Infantry Regiment, he was the 2nd American Officer (after Lt. J.G. Ord) to reach the blockhouse on top of San Juan Hill, for which he was recommended for a brevet promotion and the Medal of Honor. After the war he was for a time in charge of civil affairs in Cuba as well as being Cuba's acting Secretary of Commerce and Agriculture.

On October 9, 1899, Kennon arrived the Philippines, where he participated in military actions in the Philippine–American War. He served as Military Governor of the province of Ilocos Norte from November 1900 to March 1901. He read and memorized passages from the Koran in preparation for an assignment to a Moro area. While in Mindanao from 1901 to 1903, he built the Iligan to Lake Lanao road and then, at the request of Governor Taft, he completed in 1905 the strategically important Benguet Road from Manila to Baguio in 18 months. He did this where others had failed and the job was expected to take no less than 3 years and probably longer. This accomplishment earned him a personal letter of commendation from President Theodore Roosevelt, who described him as "the type of man we should keep an eye on."

In the next few years he traveled to Japan to examine railroads, to Brazil in 1906 as delegate to the Pan-American Congress and Military Attache. He also was sent to Alaska as part of the Commission surveying the boundary with Canada, and he was specially requested by Costa Rica to survey its southern boundary. In 1915 he commanded the 161st Depot Brigade at the U.S. Mexican border in support of the U.S.–Mexican Border War. In 1918, after training 17,000 troops at Camp Greene in North Carolina, and then after assuming command of the 171st brigade and then the 86th division at Camp Grant near Rockford, Illinois, he was denied the right to take his division overseas to France because of an unfavorable medical diagnosis. He died soon after the division's departure from New York at the Hotel Cumberland (Broadway and 54th) in New York City on September 9, 1918, probably due to the influenza outbreak.

=== Military awards ===
- Indian Campaign Medal
- Spanish Campaign Medal
- Philippine Campaign Medal
- Mexican Service Medal
- Mexican Border Service Medal

== Family life, honors and legacy ==
Lyman Kennon was married to Anne Beecher Rice Kennon (1861–1945), from Goshen, Connecticut and daughter of a military officer Maj. James Quackenbush Rice Sr. (1822–1864) who died in Virginia during the American Civil War. Anne Kennon in 1929 described her life at her 50th graduation anniversary from high school in Hartford, Connecticut as follows:

I married a soldier, the late General Kennon, then the adventures began. With great energy, unusual ability and high purpose, one important detail succeeded another. For years I followed this valiant swiftly moving figure, Utah Indian reservations, North, South, East, West, Central America, Europe, Cuba, the Philippines, China, Japan, Korea, South America, Alaska, Hawaii, our Mexican border; circling again and yet again this round globe, the life of changing impressions and ideas.

Lyman and Anne B. Rice Kennon had no children. She died on August 5, 1945, in Los Angeles, California and she was buried with her husband at Arlington National Cemetery, South Section site 2010.

Kennon was an active member of the Sons of the Revolution since his admission on September 17, 1894, having descended from Asaph Hall of Goshen, Connecticut. Captain Asaph Hall was in the Fourth Connecticut Infantry Regiment in 1775, and served as a company commander. He was later a member of Connecticut House of Representatives. Kennon's uncle Asaph Hall III (1829–1907) was a noted astronomer in the employ of the U.S. Naval Observatory.

In addition to Kennon Road in the Philippines named for him, Kennon Street in Charlotte, North Carolina as also named for him in recognition of his military service at nearby Camp Greene.
