= Governor Pack Road =

Major street in Baguio, Philippines

Coordinates: 16°22′43″N 120°32′29″E

Governor Pack Road

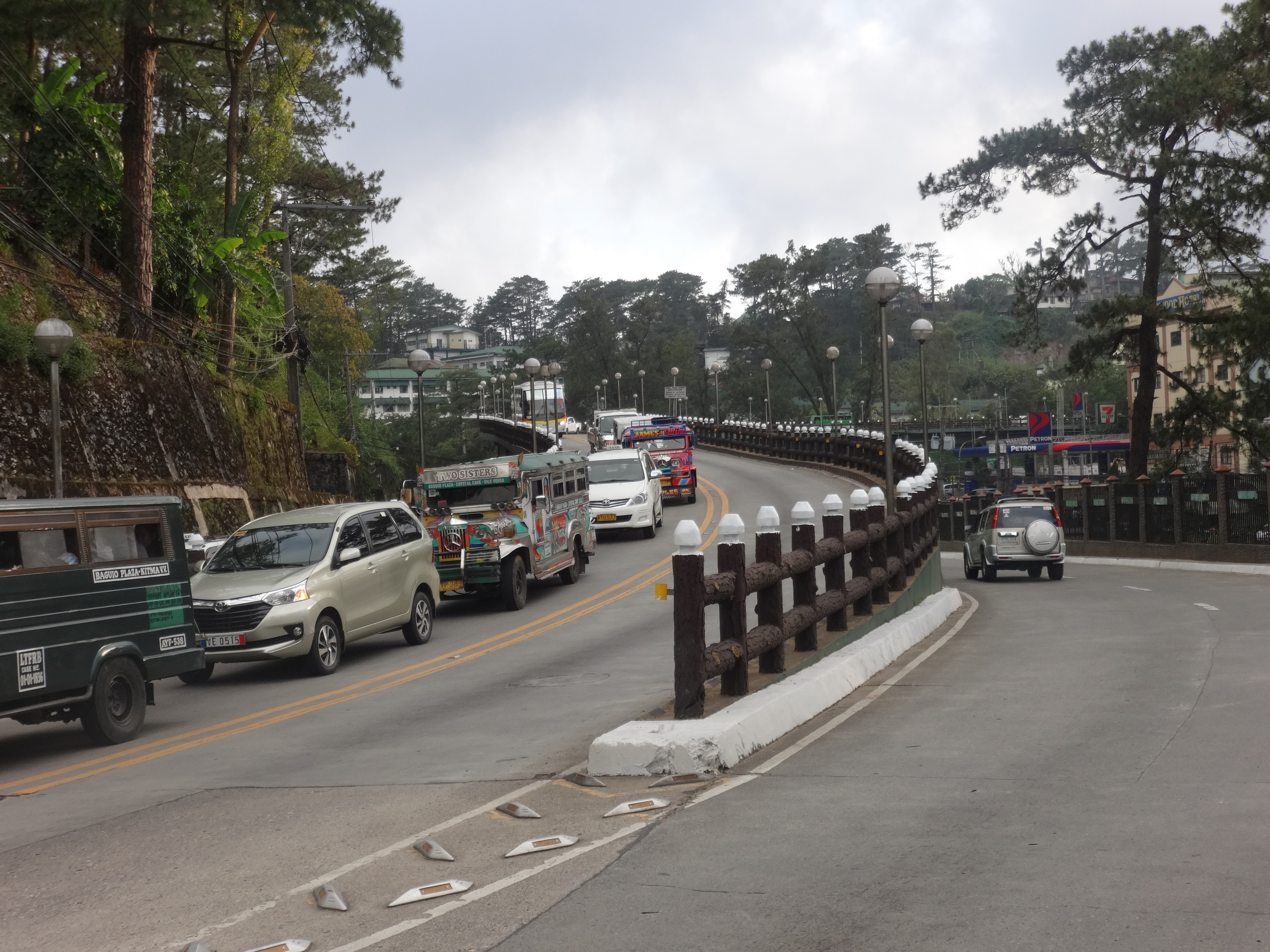
- Gov. Pack Road looking south, with BGH Flyover that connects directly to N208 (Marcos Highway). It is a component of N54.

Route information
- Maintained by Department of Public Works and Highways – Baguio City District Engineering Office
- Length: 1.085 km (0.674 mi)
- Component highways: N54 from Kennon Road to Harrison Road; N110 from Harrison Road to Session Road

Major junctions
- North end: N110 (Leonard Wood Road) / N231 (Session Road)
- N54 (Harrison Road)
- South end: N54 (Kennon Road) / N208 (Aspiras–Palispis Highway)

Location
- Country: Philippines
- Major cities: Baguio

Highway system
- Roads in the Philippines; Highways; Expressways; List

The Governor Pack Road (also referred to as Gov. Pack Road) is a major highway in Baguio, Philippines, named for the American William Francis Pack (1861–1944), who was appointed Military Governor of Benguet on November 15, 1901 and served as the civilian Governor of Mountain Province, in which Benguet was once part of as a subprovince, from 1909 to 1912.

The entire road forms part of National Route 54 (N54) and National Route 110 (N110) of the Philippine highway network. It was historically part of Highway 11 especially during the American colonial era.

== Route description ==
The road connects from a roundabout of Aspiras-Palispis Highway (formerly Marcos Highway), Kennon Road, and Kisad Road to Session Road in the city's downtown core. Its section from UP Drive to Harrison Road carries one-way southbound traffic only. At its intersection with Harrison Road, it changes route number from N54 to N110.

== Landmarks ==
From the north:

- Victory Liner Old Baguio Terminal
- Genesis Transport Bus Terminal
- Partas Bus Terminal
- SM City Baguio
- University of the Cordilleras
- Baguio Tourism Complex
- Baguio City National High School
- University of the Philippines Baguio
- Baguio General Hospital and Medical Center
