= Kennon Road =

Road in Luzon, Philippines

Kennon Road
- Benguet Road; Rosario–Baguio Road
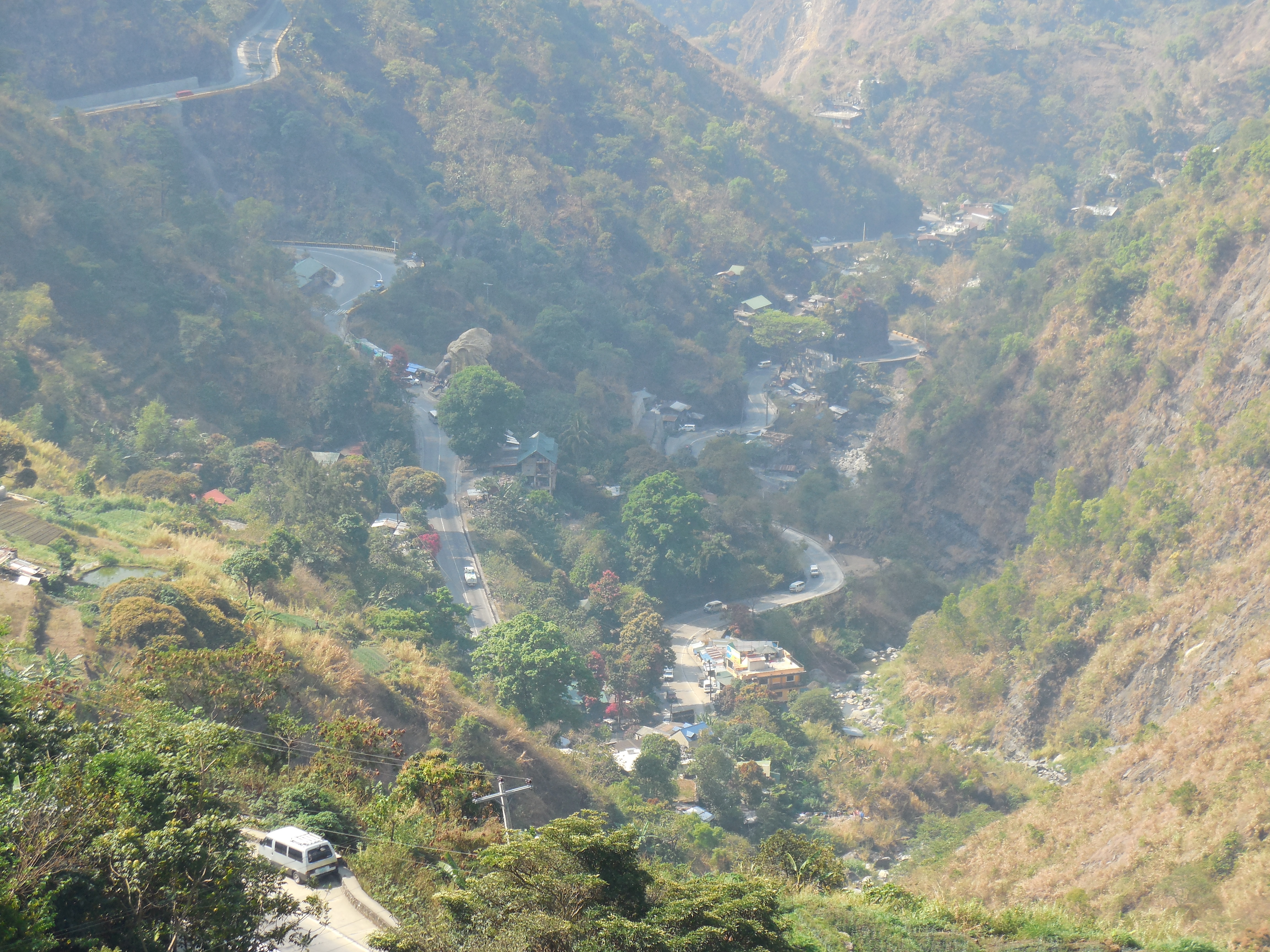
- Kennon Road as viewed from the Kennon Road Viewdeck

Route information
- Maintained by Department of Public Works and Highways; La Union 2nd District Engineering Office; Benguet 1st District Engineering Office; Baguio City District Engineering Office
- Length: 33.534 km (20.837 mi)
- Existed: 1905–present
- Component highways: N54
- Restrictions: Trucks; Buses

Major junctions
- North end: N208 (Aspiras–Palispis Highway) / N54 (Governor Pack Road) in Baguio
- N233 (Monticello Road) in Baguio; N231 (Loakan Road) in Baguio
- South end: N2 (MacArthur Highway) in Rosario, La Union

Location
- Country: Philippines
- Provinces: Benguet, La Union
- Major cities: Baguio
- Towns: Rosario, Pugo, Tuba

Highway system
- Roads in the Philippines; Highways; Expressways; List

Kennon Road, also known as the Rosario–Baguio Road, is a two lane 33.53-kilometer (20.83 mi) roadway in Benguet province in the Philippines connecting the mountain city of Baguio in Benguet to the lowland town of Rosario in La Union province. Originally called Benguet Road, it was later renamed in honor of its builder, Col. Lyman Walter Vere Kennon of the U.S. Army Corps of Engineers.

The construction began in 1903 and opened for travel on January 29, 1905. It is the second oldest road that leads to Baguio, after Quirino Highway, and the shortest route to Baguio for travelers from Manila and provinces in central and southern Luzon.

The entire road forms part of National Route 54 (N54) of the Philippine highway network.

== Route description ==
As one of the four major access roads from the lowlands that lead to the highland city of Baguio, most of Kennon Road's stretch encompasses the municipality of Tuba in the province of Benguet. Settlements along the highway, known as Camps 1 to 8, were originally established for the pioneer builders of the road, but have since been occupied by local residents. The steepest portion of the road between Camp 6 and Camp 7 is commonly known as "Zigzag Road" because of the numerous switchbacks required. The Bued River flows down a rocky canyon and along this course the road was cut above the river bed.

The highway is a toll road, with the lower tollgate located about 2.5 kilometers (1.6 mi) from the junction at Pugo near Camp 1. The upper tollgate is about 13 kilometers (8.1 mi) south of Baguio near the Lion's Head and Camp 6, in Tuba.

== History ==
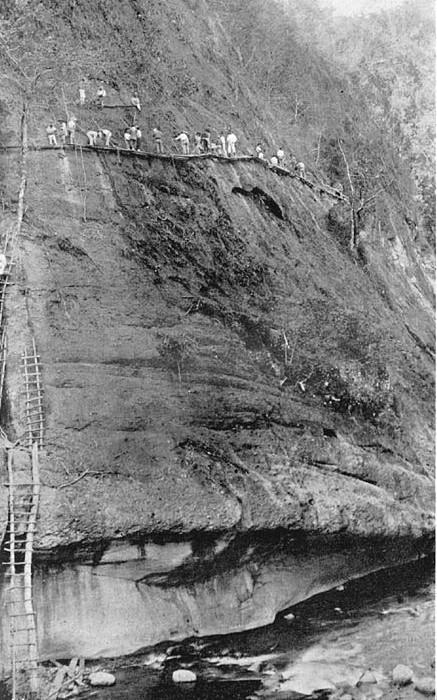
Benguet Road construction crew near Camp 5, Tuba, Benguet ca1903 setting explosives into a sheer cliff of the Bued River Canyon.

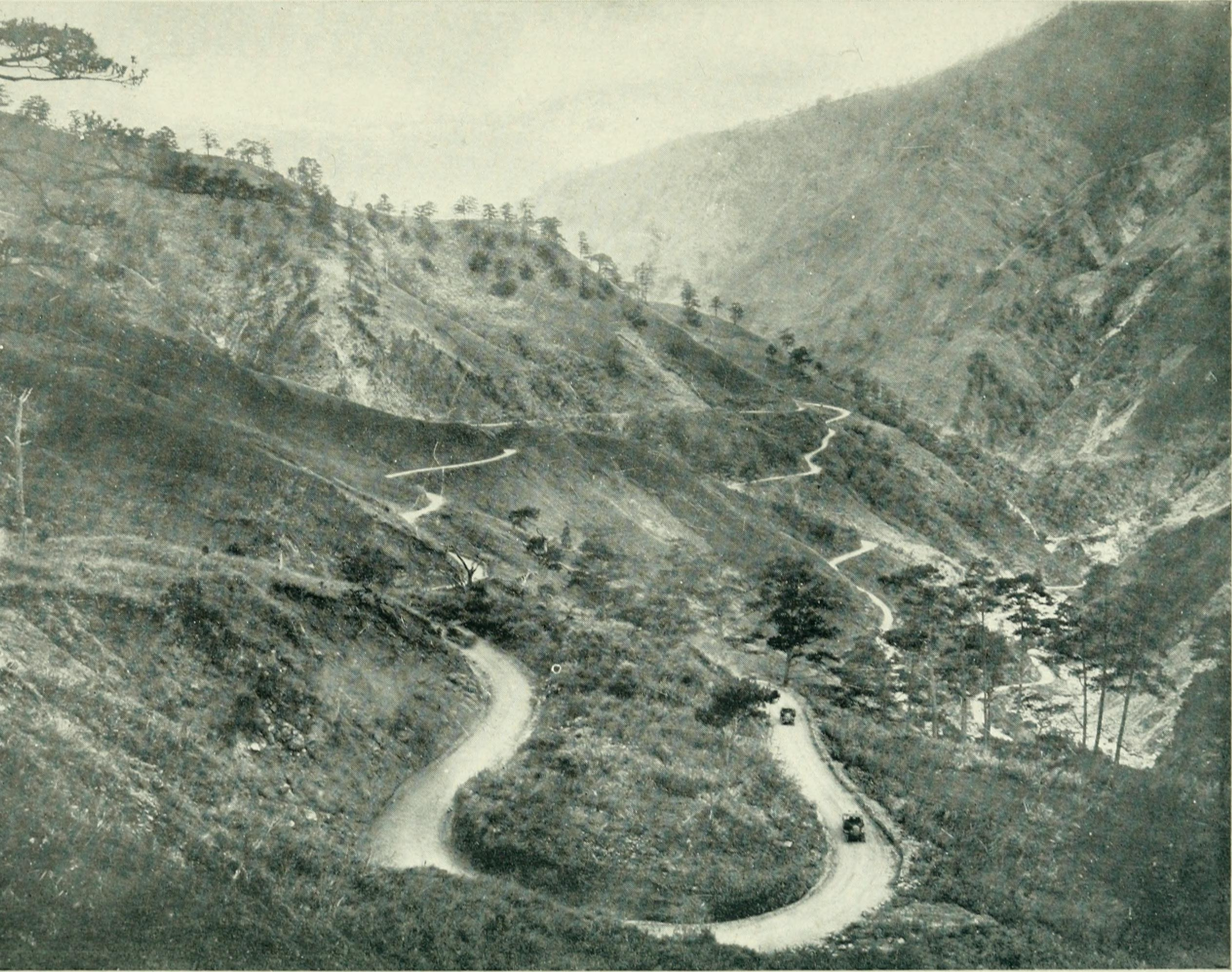
Kennon Road near Camp 7, Baguio in 1914

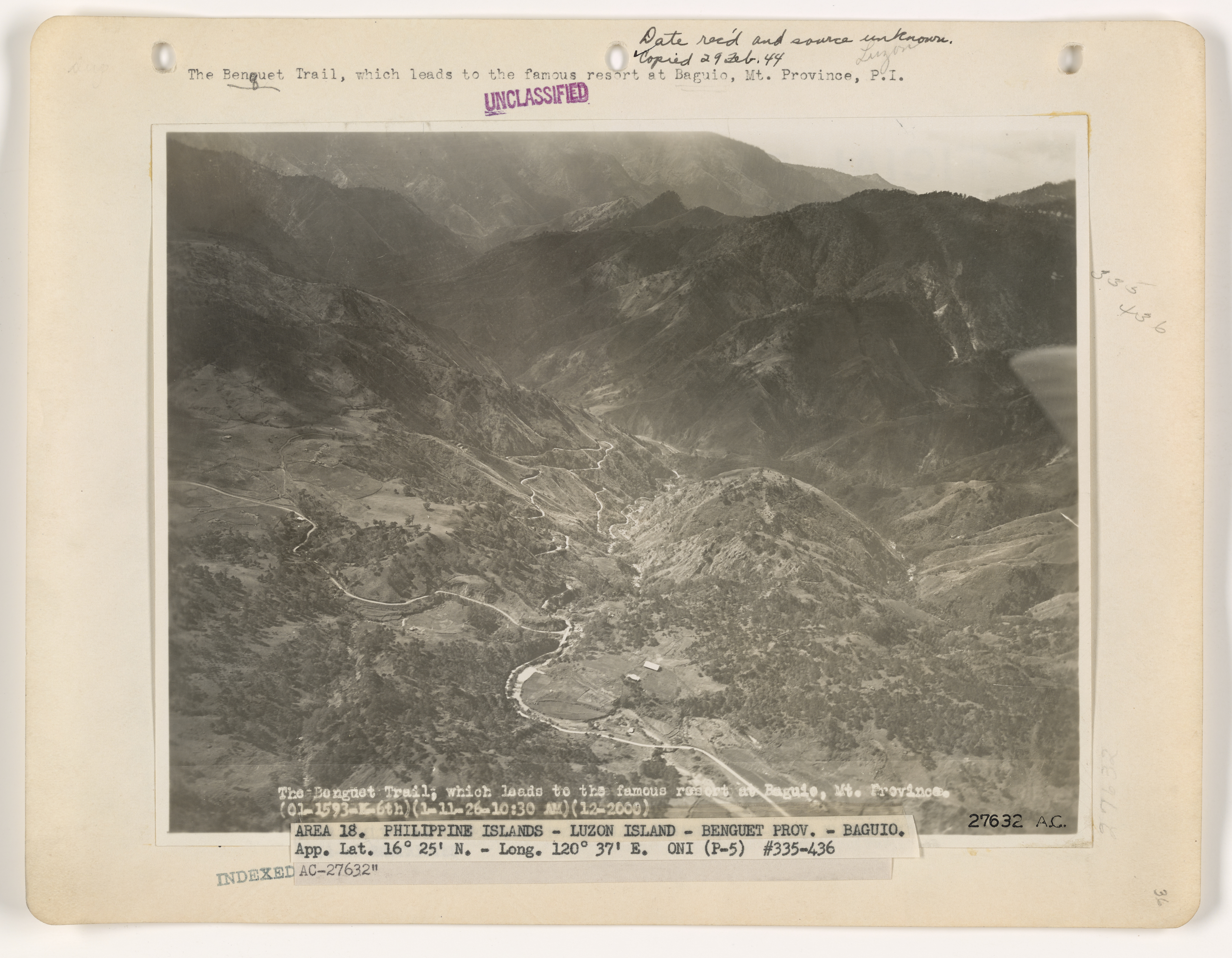
Kennon Road, circa 1940s

As the American colonial government wanted to make Baguio a summer retreat to solidify Manila’s position, they decided to build a sturdy and reliable road to go there. They first tapped Charles W. Mead, who was a civil engineer, but he was subsequently replaced by Colonel N.M. Holmes. Two years after in 1903, the project was turned over to the administration of Lyman Kennon.

The construction of the road commenced in 1903 by cutting across the mountains of Benguet with the combined efforts of various Filipinos, Americans, Chinese Filipinos and Japanese nationals. It was considered one of the most difficult and expensive civil engineering projects of its day, with expenditures by the newly established Insular Government of the Philippine Islands over US$2.7 million. The Americans were inimical and irked, as evident in their stance that it was the "Christian Feast Holidays" celebrated by the Filipinos that caused the delays in the completion of the road.

More than 2,300 foreign and local workers worked on the road. Aside from Filipino engineers and construction workers and U.S. Army Corps of Engineers headed by Col. Lyman Kennon, foreigners from 36 countries were recruited to work on the road; the majority, at about 1,500 or 22%, were Japanese, and about 1,000 were Chinese. The road proved to be a more challenging and dangerous than the original plan of Mead. Hundreds of workers died from malaria and dysentery while more plunged to their deaths while building the road. They are also affected when intense rainpour dredged their positions. The eventual result was in reality, a deviation from the original plan. After the road was completed, some of the foreign road workers, such as those from British Hong Kong and Japan, decided to remain in Baguio to live permanently, such as some Cantonese Chinese Filipinos or in the case of some Japanese Filipinos, move to work in Abaca plantations in Mintal or Calinan in Davao City.

The original road was a Macadam Telford-type road which was later improved into an all-weather asphalt roadway. More recently, some portions of Kennon Road have been replaced with concrete pavement.

The highway was severely damaged by the 1990 Luzon earthquake that the Department of Public Works and Highways decided for the permanent closure of the road. The highway was proposed to be replaced by a road traversing through the town of Itogon on the way to the lowlands of San Manuel, but was met with criticism from the inhabitants of Baguio. Kennon Road was reopened for public use on September 1, 1991, after rehabilitation efforts were completed. Throughout the years, however, the road has been subjected to temporary closures due to landslides that occurred during heavy storms or earthquakes. The road is currently being repaired and maintained by the Department of Public Works and Highways (DPWH) with usage limited only to light vehicles and only to residents living around the area. The rehabilitation and improvement of Kennon Road is currently being considered to be put under the Public-Private Partnership (PPP) scheme with the DPWH starting consultations with an international firm for a pre-feasibility study regarding the project.

In December 2021, Republic Act No. 11604 was signed into law which mandates the Department of Public Works and Highways to undertake the full rehabilitation and maintenance of Kennon Road.

=== Kennon Road rock shed ===
The DPWH-CAR Director Khadaffy Tanggol announced that the P264 million rock shed construction along Camp 6, Tuba, Benguet is 64.37 percent complete. The 152-meter shed, which will be the catchment area for slope debris is expected to be finished in September. However, the Road will be closed for 2 months due to the prefabricated shed installation after having completed the Bued River columns.

== Road hazards ==
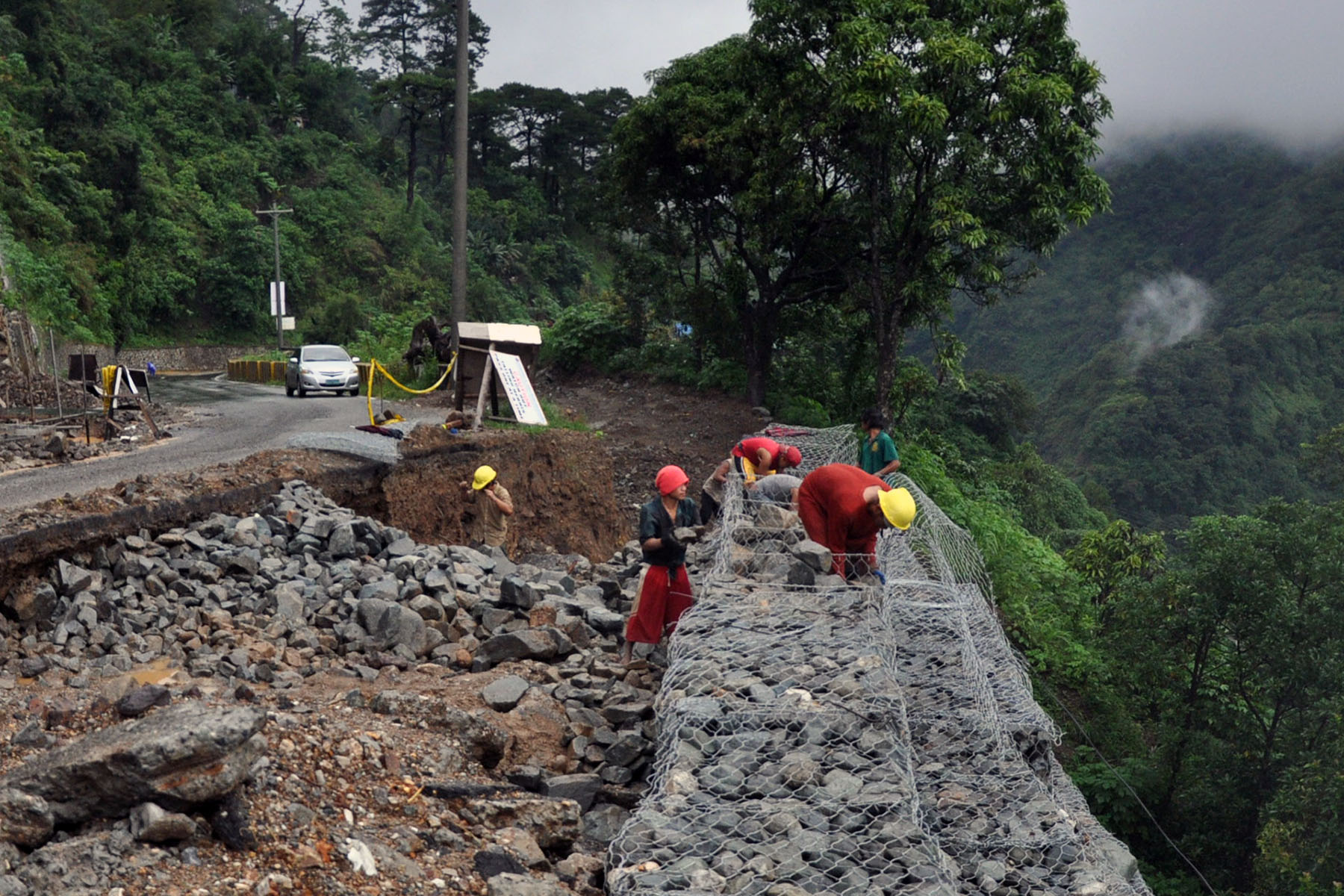
Rehabilitation works on the retaining wall of the Uabac section of the road was done in 2016 after it was damaged by continuous rains the year before.

Kennon Road is one of the most hazardous roads in the Philippines, especially during rainy seasons, when road accidents are common. The road is closed during heavy rains or typhoon conditions to avoid casualties from landslides.

Portions of the highway are also prone to land-sinking, particularly along Barangay Camp 3 in Tuba.

It usually takes an experienced driver from 45 minutes to an hour to negotiate the 41.2-kilometer (25.6 mi) steep and winding climb by car.

== Intersections ==
Intersections are numbered by kilometer posts, with Rizal Park in Manila designated as kilometer zero.

Region	Province	City/Municipality (Note: Sources:)	km	mi	Destinations	Notes
Ilocos Region	La Union	Rosario	214.613	133.354	N2 (Manila North Road)	Southern terminus
Ilocos Region	La Union	Pugo			No major junctions	
Ilocos Region	La Union	Pugo			Camp 1 toll gate	
Ilocos Region–CAR boundary	La Union–Benguet boundary	Pugo–Tuba boundary	215.155– 215.158	133.691– 133.693	La Union 2nd District Engineering Office–Benguet 1st Engineering Office highway boundary	
Cordillera Administrative Region	Benguet	Tuba			Camp 1 Bridge 1 over Bued River	
Cordillera Administrative Region	Benguet	Tuba	217.723	135.287	Kennon–Agat Road	
Cordillera Administrative Region	Benguet	Tuba			Colorado Bridge	
Cordillera Administrative Region	Benguet	Tuba	227.038	141.075	Ampasit Bridge	
Cordillera Administrative Region	Benguet	Tuba	227.784	141.538	Camp 3 Bridge 2	
Cordillera Administrative Region	Benguet	Tuba			Ataki Bridge	
Cordillera Administrative Region	Benguet	Tuba			Camp 4 Bridge 1 over Bued River	
Cordillera Administrative Region	Benguet	Tuba	231.127	143.616	Camp 4 Bridge 2	
Cordillera Administrative Region	Benguet	Tuba			Pugo Bridge over Bued River	
Cordillera Administrative Region	Benguet	Tuba	232.259	144.319	Maramal Bridge over Bued River	
Cordillera Administrative Region	Benguet	Tuba			Camp 4 Bridge 4	
Cordillera Administrative Region	Benguet	Tuba	233.358	145.002	Camp 4 Bridge 5	
Cordillera Administrative Region	Benguet	Tuba			Camp 5 Bridge 1	
Cordillera Administrative Region	Benguet	Tuba	235.465	146.311	Camp 5 Bridge 2	
Cordillera Administrative Region	Benguet	Tuba			Camp 6 toll gate	
Cordillera Administrative Region	Benguet	Tuba	236.940	147.228	Camp 6 Bridge	
Cordillera Administrative Region	Benguet	Tuba	237.529	147.594	Start of Kennon Road rock shed	
Cordillera Administrative Region	Benguet	Tuba	237.680	147.688	End of Kennon Road rock shed	
Cordillera Administrative Region	Benguet	Tuba			Demonstration Bridge over Basa Creek	
Cordillera Administrative Region	Benguet	Tuba–Baguio boundary	239.593– 240.899	148.876– 149.688	Benguet 1st District Engineering Office–Baguio City Engineering Office highway boundary. Lion's Head.	
Cordillera Administrative Region	Benguet	Baguio	245.158	152.334	N231 (Loakan Road)	
Cordillera Administrative Region	Benguet	Baguio	246.550	153.199	N233 (Monticello Road)	
Cordillera Administrative Region	Benguet	Baguio			Military Cut-off Road	
Cordillera Administrative Region	Benguet	Baguio	248.147	154.191	N54 (Governor Pack Road) / N208 (Aspiras–Palispis Highway)	Roundabout. Northern terminus.
1.000 mi = 1.609 km; 1.000 km = 0.621 mi: Tolled

== Gallery ==
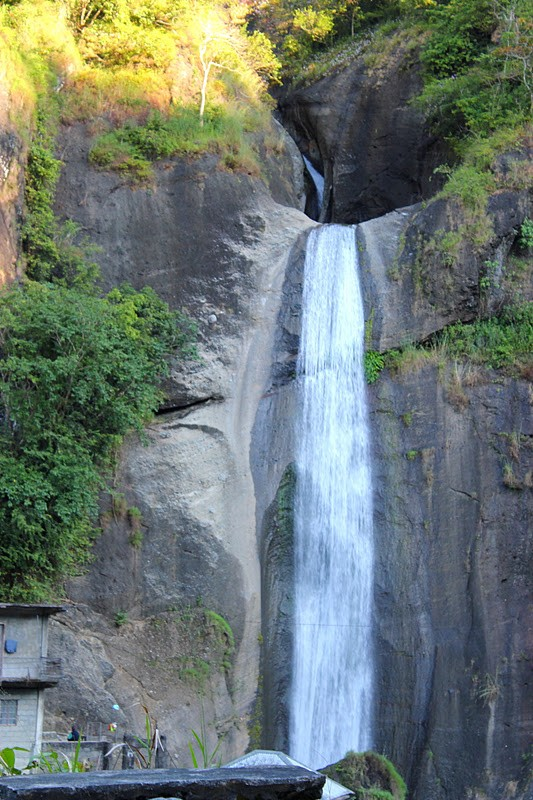
Bridal Veil Falls in the Bued River Canyon viewed from Kennon Road

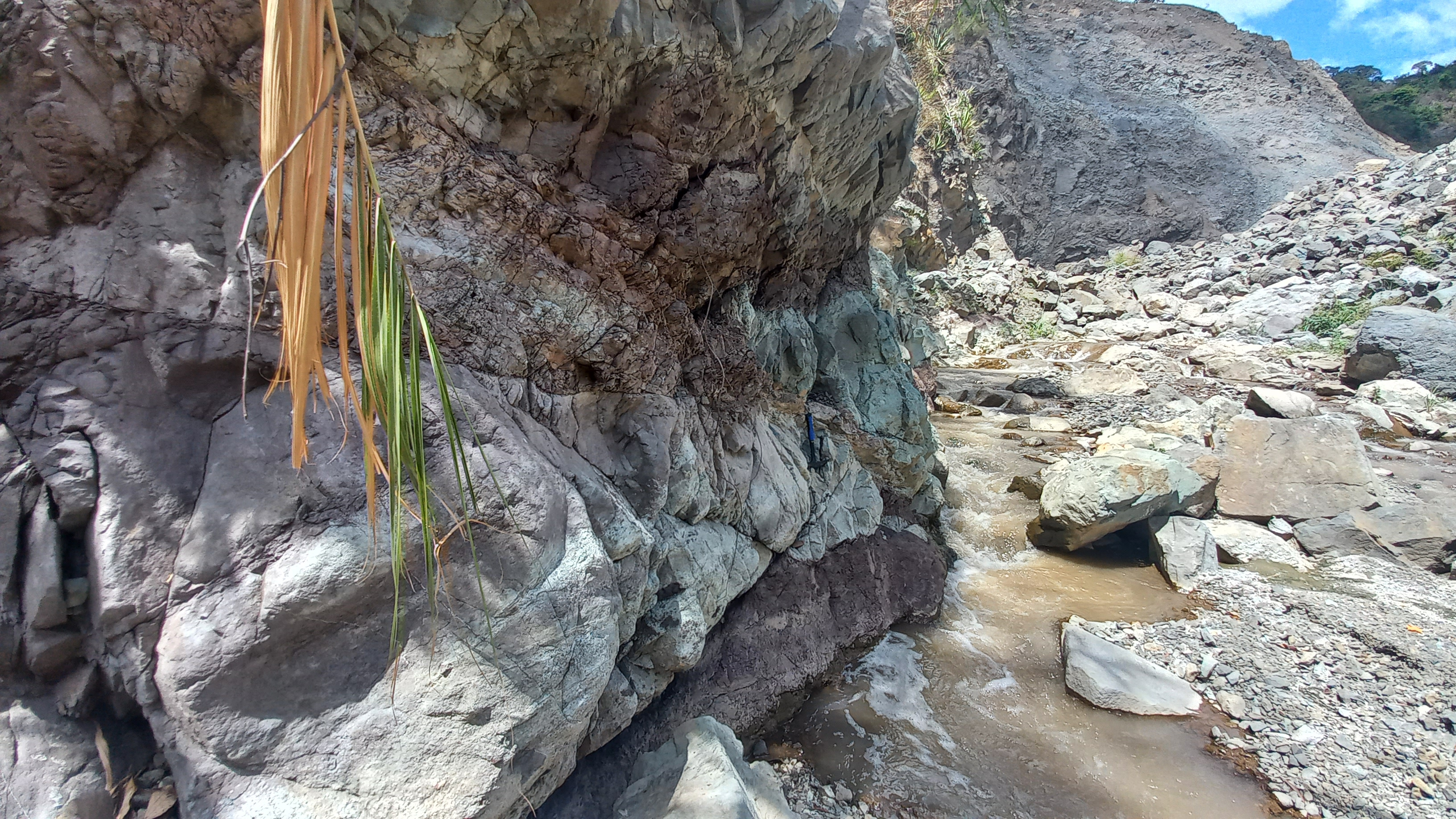
Sandstone layers of the Zigzag formation found below the Zigzag road
