= Aspiras–Palispis Highway =

Road in Luzon, Philippines

Coordinates: 16°22′43″N 120°32′29″E

Aspiras–Palispis Highway
- Marcos Highway; Agoo–Baguio Road
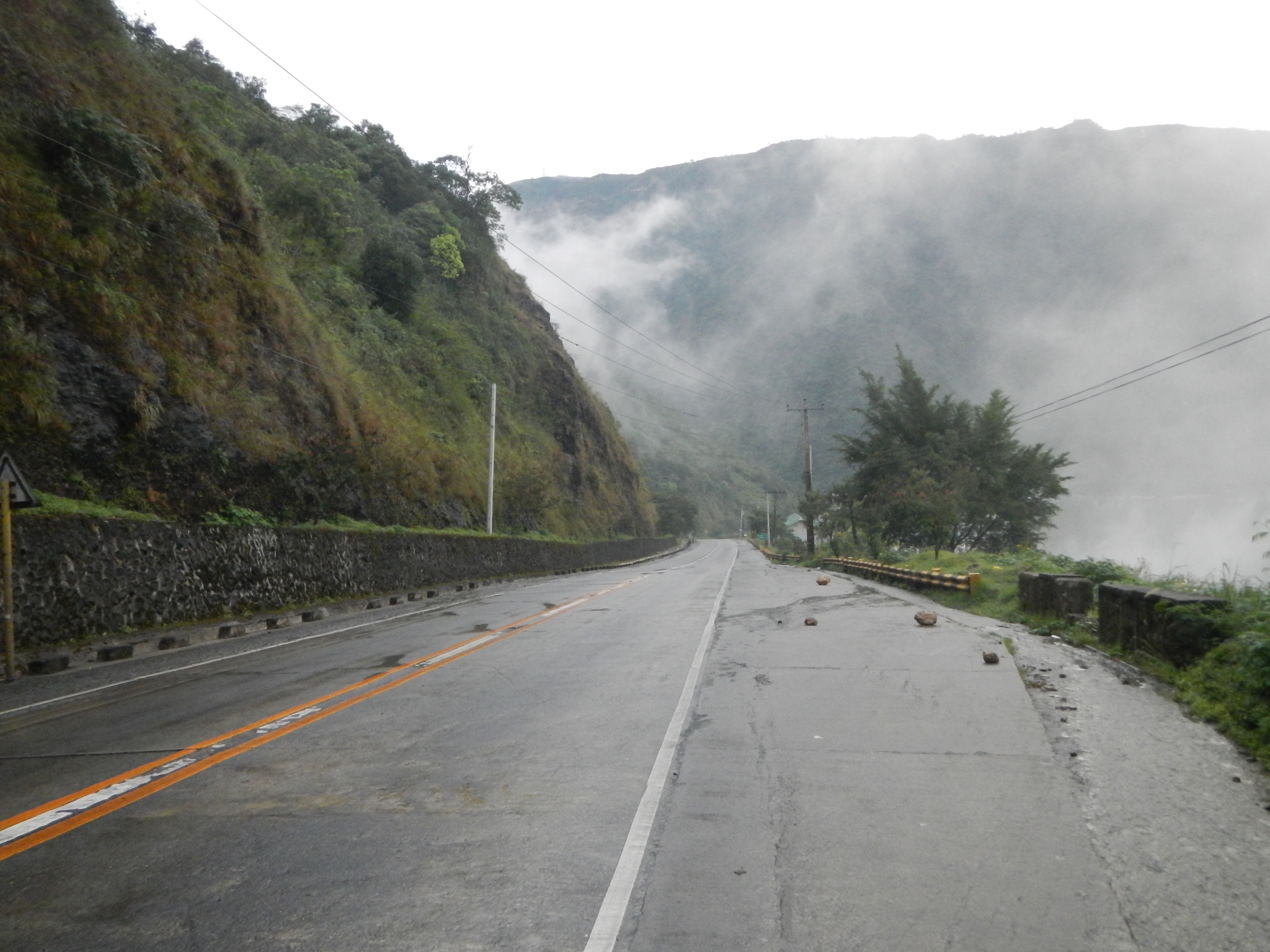
- The highway in Tuba

Route information
- Length: 47.17 km (29.31 mi)
- Existed: 1976–present
- Component highways: N208 (Baguio to Agoo)

Major junctions
- East end: N54 (Governor Pack Road & Kennon Road) in Baguio
- N233 (Western Link Circumferential Road) in Baguio; N209 (Pugo–Rosario Road) in Pugo, La Union
- West end: N2 (MacArthur Highway) in Agoo

Location
- Country: Philippines
- Provinces: La Union, Benguet
- Major cities: Baguio
- Towns: Agoo, Tubao, Pugo, Tuba

Highway system
- Roads in the Philippines; Highways; Expressways; List
← N207	→ N209

The Aspiras–Palispis Highway (formerly known and still referred to as Marcos Highway or Agoo–Baguio Road) is a major Philippine highway in northern Luzon that runs from the city of Baguio landlocked by the province of Benguet to the municipality of Agoo in the province of La Union.

The 47.17-kilometer (29.31 mi) highway traverses the municipality of Tuba in Benguet and the autonomous city of Baguio, and the municipalities of Pugo, Tubao, and Agoo in La Union.

It is one of the four main roads used by motorists and travelers to access Baguio from the northwestern lowlands of Luzon. The highway's several rehabilitation and development efforts led to the road's categorization as an "all-weather road", and is the preferred highway by motorists over the older Kennon Road.

The entire highway is designated as National Route 208 (N208) of the Philippine highway network.

== History ==
Marcos Highway was renamed Aspiras–Palispis Highway on October 31, 2000, with the issuance of Republic Act 8971. The highway section covering the province of Benguet was designated as the Ben Palispis Highway in honor of former Benguet Governor Ben Palispis. The La Union section of Marcos Highway was named Jose D. Aspiras Highway after former La Union assemblyman and Tourism Minister Jose Aspiras. However, the former name is considered by people to be more familiar and is still preferred by most.

The Palina Bridge, situated along the Benguet–La Union boundary, serves as the boundary between the two highways.

== Intersections ==
Intersections are numbered by kilometer posts, with Rizal Park in Manila designated as kilometer zero.

Region	Province	City/Municipality	km	mi	Destinations	Notes
Ilocos Region	La Union	Agoo	236.115	146.715	N2 (Manila North Road) – Manila, Laoag	Western terminus.
Ilocos Region	La Union	Agoo			Cases Boulevard	
Ilocos Region	La Union	Agoo			Macalva Barangay Road	
Ilocos Region	La Union	Tubao			Aspiras Street	
Ilocos Region	La Union	Tubao			Nilangoyan–Tubao Road	
Ilocos Region	La Union	Tubao			Asin–Nangalisan–San Pascual Road	
Ilocos Region	La Union	Tubao	244	152	Tavora Street	
Ilocos Region	La Union	Pugo			N209 (Pugo–Rosario Road) – Rosario, Manila, Tarlac	
Ilocos Region	La Union	Pugo	251.422	156.226	Cares Bridge (over Pugo River)	
Ilocos Region–Cordillera Administrative Region boundary	La Union–Benguet boundary	Pugo–Tuba boundary	259.267– 259.314	161.101– 161.130	La Union 2nd–Benguet 1st highway boundary	
Cordillera Administrative Region	Benguet	Tuba	259.314	161.130	No major junctions	
Cordillera Administrative Region	Benguet	Tuba	276	171	Badiwan Tunnel	
Cordillera Administrative Region	Benguet	Tuba	277	172	Badiwan Viaduct	
Cordillera Administrative Region	Benguet	Tuba–Baguio boundary	279.145– 279.149	173.453– 173.455	Benguet 1st–Baguio highway boundary	
Cordillera Administrative Region	Benguet	Baguio	280.702	174.420	N233 (Balacbac Feeder Road), Santo Tomas - Mount Cabuyo Road	
Cordillera Administrative Region	Benguet	Baguio			N233 (Western Link Circumferential Road)	
Cordillera Administrative Region	Benguet	Baguio			Bakakeng Road	
Cordillera Administrative Region	Benguet	Baguio	282	175	Legarda Road	
Cordillera Administrative Region	Benguet	Baguio	283.454	176.130	N54 (Governor Pack Road & Kennon Road), Kisad Road	Baguio General Hospital Circle and Flyover. Eastern terminus. Road continues north as Governor Pack Road via BGH Flyover.
1.000 mi = 1.609 km; 1.000 km = 0.621 mi

== Notable landmarks ==
The 519-meter (1,703 ft) long Badiwan Viaduct, constructed in 2001, with help from the Japan International Cooperation Agency (JICA), serves as a major bridge along Badiwan, Barangay Poblacion in Tuba, Benguet. Several meters from it is a concrete rock shed to protect motorists from landslides.

The blasted remains of the bust of Ferdinand Marcos, a giant concrete head sculpture of the former president, can be seen along the highway at Barangay Palina, in Pugo, La Union.
