= N231 highway =

Road in the Philippines

National Route 231 (N231) forms a part of the Philippine highway network. It is a secondary road that runs through southern Benguet, from the City of Baguio to Itogon.

== Baguio ==
The northern section of the N231 runs through the Baguio Central Business District along Shanum Street, Lower Session Road and Upper Session Road.

== Baguio to Itogon ==
The N231 continues to Itogon. The central section from Baguio to Kias is known as Loakan Road.
