= Balintawak =

Balintawak may refer to:

- Balintawak or Balingasa, a district of Quezon City, Philippines
- Balintawak, a simple, three-piece style of Baro’t saya, a popular form of female Filipino national dress
- Balintawak Eskrima, a Filipino martial art
- Balintawak station, a station on the Manila LRT Line 1
- Balintawak Interchange, a junction between the North Luzon Expressway and Epifanio de los Santos Avenue
- Balintawak (dress), also known as the "cocktail terno", a shorter version of the traditional traje de mestiza formal dress of the Philippines
- Another name for pan de regla, a Filipino bread with a bread pudding filling.

== See also ==
- Cry of Pugad Lawin, also known as the Cry of Balintawak
- Melchora Aquino, also called the Mother of Balintawak
- Our Lady of Balintawak, an icon venerated in the Philippine Independent Church
