= Ayala Malls Cloverleaf =

- Ayala Malls Cloverleaf
- Location: Quezon City, Metro Manila, Philippines
- Coordinates: 14°39′21″N 121°00′00″E
- Address: Cloverleaf Estate, A. Bonifacio Avenue corner EDSA, Balingasa, Quezon City
- Opened: October 25, 2017; 9 years ago
- Developer: Ayala Land
- Manager: Ayala Malls
- Owner: Ayala Corporation
- Num. of stores: 150+
- Floor area: 69,000 m^{2} (740,000 ft^{2})
- Floors: 4 + 2 parking levels
- Parking: 700
- Public transit: Balintawak; E Balintawak; 8 9 19 21 22 Ayala Malls Cloverleaf
- Website: Main website

Ayala Malls Cloverleaf is a shopping mall developed and managed by Ayala Malls, inside the Cloverleaf Estate in Quezon City.

This is among the fifth Ayala Malls' establishments to be built in Quezon City after TriNoma, UP Town Center, Fairview Terraces and Ayala Malls Vertis North. It is located along A. Bonifacio Avenue just near the southern end of NLEX and the boundary of Caloocan at the Balintawak Cloverleaf. This mall sees foot traffic of approximately 15,000 to 20,000 visitors daily. The mall opened on October 25, 2017.

== Cloverleaf Estate ==
The mall is named after the cloverleaf interchange, built in the 1960s in response to increasing traffic activity in NLEX and neighboring cities, as well as the eponymous Cloverleaf Estate, where the mall sits on. The 11-hectare (27-acre) land is hailed as one of the green-oriented developments of Ayala Corporation. Previously a market and factory complex of Central Textile Mills, it features high-rise residential condominiums from Avida Towers, and a future hospital facility. It is aimed to be a mixed-use area in the heart of the city.

The Avida Towers Cloverleaf is sold out and its construction for tower 2 was launched in 2021.

The mall is now targeted for expansion for the Phase 2 of its mall development, with construction scheduled to start in January 2020, and was targeted to be finished by 2022. However, presumably due to the COVID-19 pandemic, the expansion is not yet in effect.

The estate is connected by various thoroughfares coming from Caloocan and Quezon City, including the Metro Manila Skyway Stage 3 and serves and provides access to the nearby barangays Balingasa and Apolonio Samson as well as a convenient stopover to and from NLEX.

The site will also host the comeback flagship store of Makro, with the Ayala group resuming its previous investment role.

== Features ==
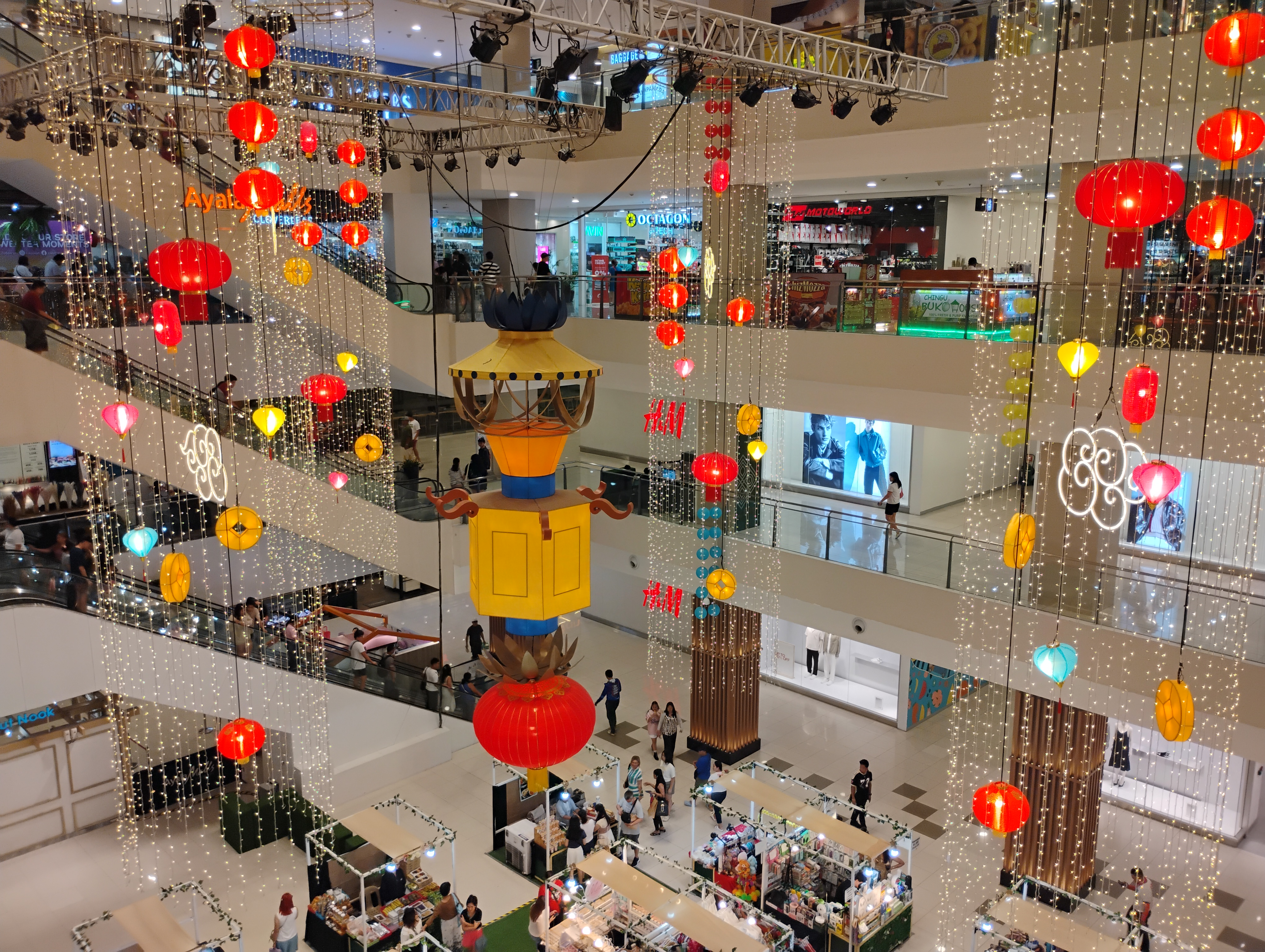
Interior

The mall has four levels, two parking levels above the mall, and a spacious events center as with other Ayala Malls. It has no basement levels, possibly due to the presence of a creek nearby. A large vacant lot in front of the mall, where the future hospital will be constructed, also serves as a vast paid parking area. It also features traditional amenities such as cinemas, food court and recreational facilities.

The mall features a Robinsons Supermarket as its anchor tenant. It formerly housed a Robinsons Department Store until 2024, when it closed to be converted to more retail space. Like other Ayala Malls, it also houses global clothing retailers including a two-level H&M store, as well as Anytime Fitness. Uniqlo, Penshoppe and other brands can be found here as well.

Transportation options include a direct link to Balintawak LRT Station, UV Express, buses, jeepneys and tricycles.
