= Harbor Link Interchange =

Major intersection in Valenzuela, Metro Manila

- NLEX Harbor Link Interchange; Mindanao Interchange
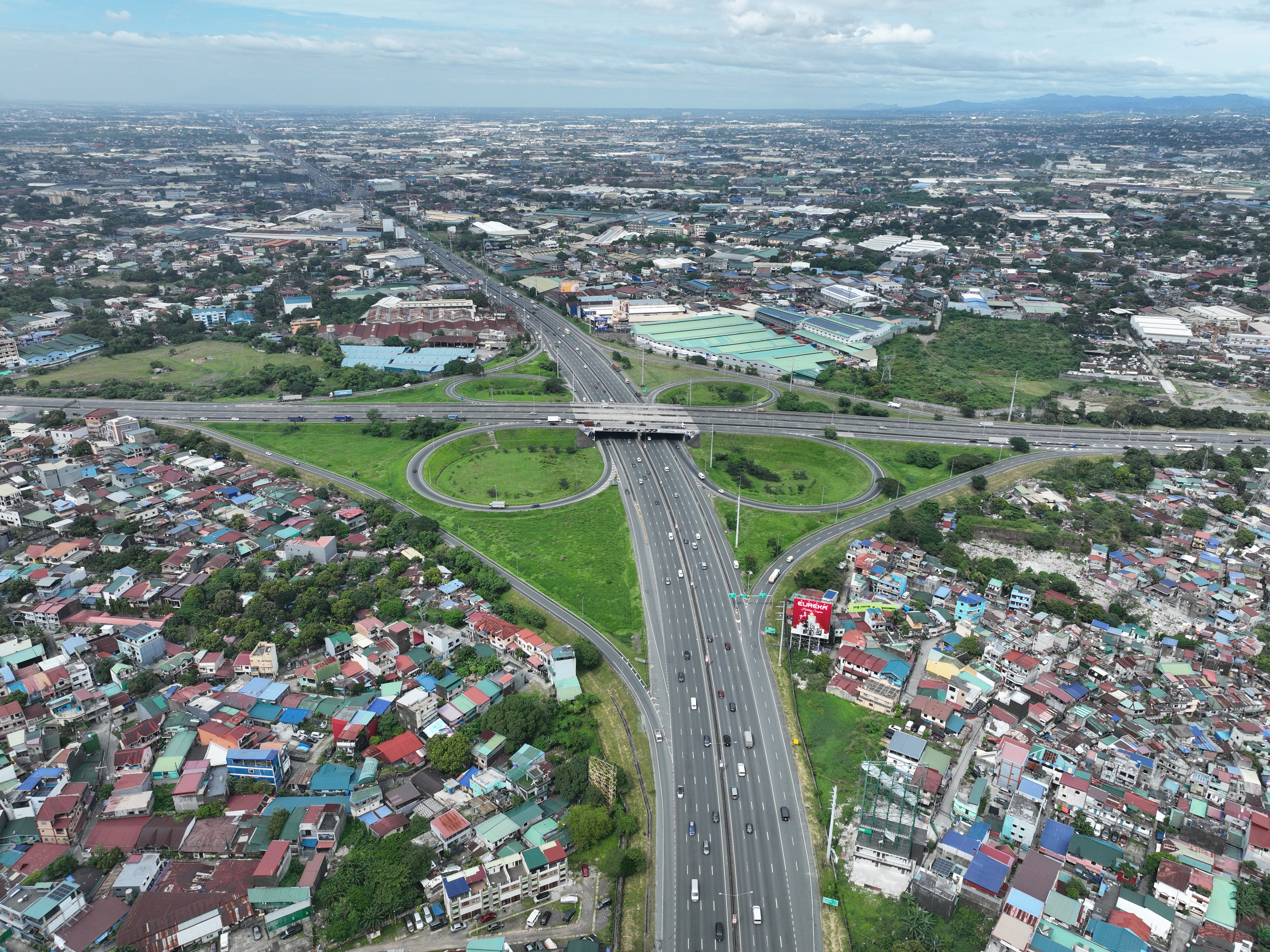
- Drone shot of the Harbor Link Interchange facing north in 2026
- Interactive map of Harbor Link Interchange

Location
- General T. De Leon and Parada, Valenzuela, Metro Manila, Philippines
- Coordinates: 14°41′36.7″N 121°0′1.6″E
- Roads at junction: AH 26 (E1) (North Luzon Expressway); E5 (NLEX Harbor Link)

Construction
- Type: Two-level cloverleaf interchange
- Constructed: 2009–2010 by Leighton Contractors Asia Ltd
- Opened: June 5, 2010
- Maintained by: Department of Public Works and Highways; NLEX Corporation
- Tolls: Part of the open section of NLEX (see NLEX toll matrix)

The Harbor Link Interchange, also known as the Mindanao Interchange and North Luzon Expressway Harbor Link Interchange (NLEX Harbor Link Interchange) and formerly known as the Smart Connect Interchange, is a two-level cloverleaf interchange in Valenzuela, Metro Manila, Philippines which serves as the junction of North Luzon Expressway (NLEX) between its main segment and its Harbor Link project, particularly Segments 8.1 and 9, components of Circumferential Road 5 (C-5). Built as part of the 2.7-kilometer (1.7 mi) NLEX Segment 8.1 of the Harbor Link project extending the expressway to Mindanao Avenue, which has since been incorporated into the C-5 system, it is the Philippines' largest cloverleaf interchange in terms of land area.

== History ==
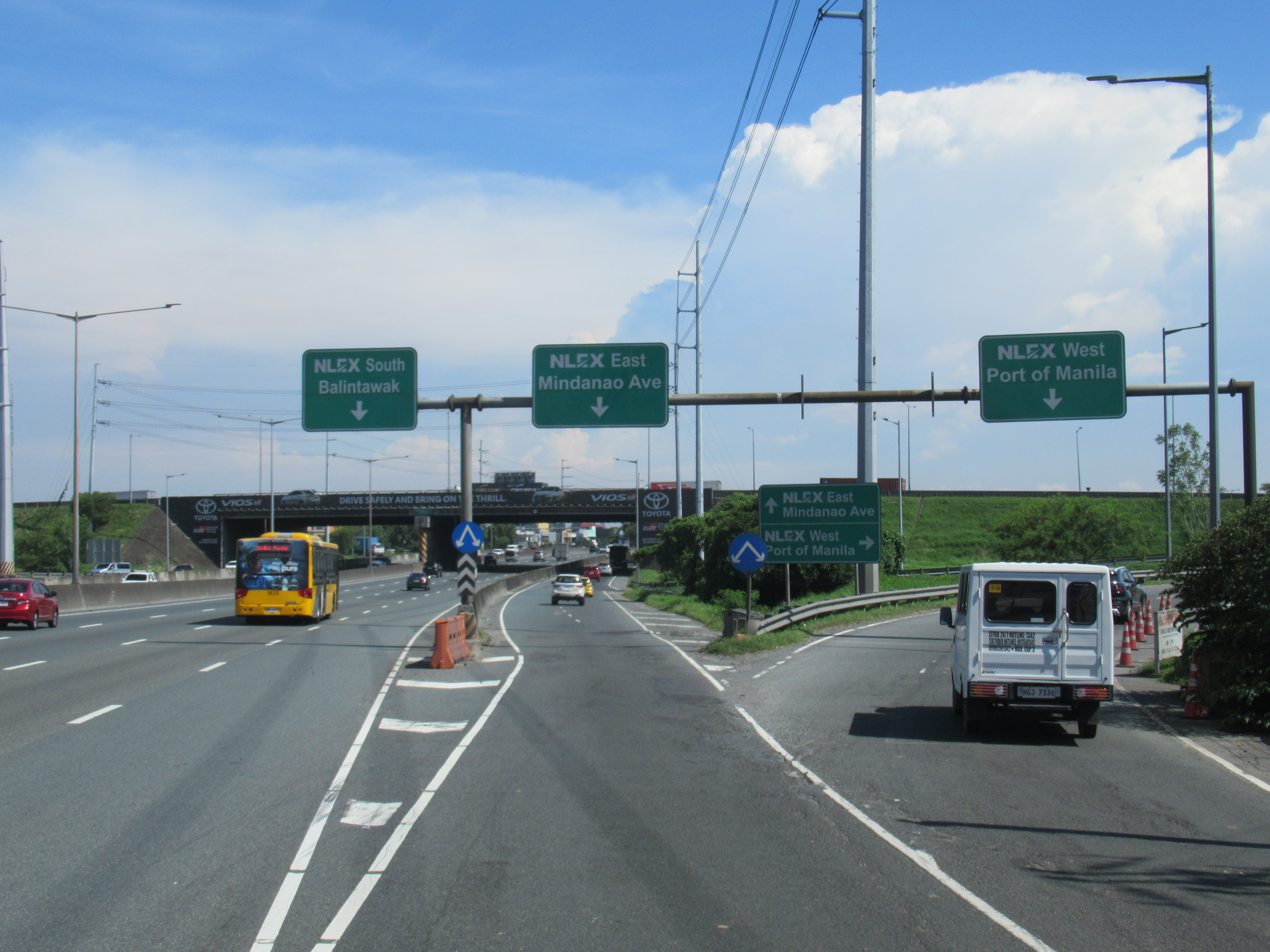
NLEX southbound at Harbor Link Interchange

During the planning stages of Circumferential Road 5 (C-5), a planned interchange with the Manila North Expressway (now North Luzon Expressway) was also in place. Based on a 1980 feasibility study by the Japan International Cooperation Agency, the proposed location of the interchange, then known as C-5/Manila North Expressway Interchange, was at MNEX's bend in Valenzuela.

Construction of NLEX Segment 8.1, including the present-day Harbor Link Interchange on the same proposed site, broke ground on April 2, 2009, with actual construction work beginning 19 days later.

The entire segment was opened to traffic on June 5, 2010, with President Gloria Macapagal Arroyo and Manuel V. Pangilinan, chairman of the Manila North Tollways Corporation, the concessionaire of the North Luzon Expressway, leading the inauguration along with Public Works and Highways Secretary Victor Domingo and high-ranking officials from Valenzuela. With some 30,000 vehicles estimated to use the new road daily during its first year of operation, since its opening, it has helped to relieve traffic on the older Balintawak Interchange connecting Epifanio de los Santos Avenue (EDSA) to NLEX, which is three times smaller.

Although the interchange was opened to traffic in 2010, it originally only carried traffic between Valenzuela and eastern Metro Manila via NLEX Segment 8.1, with the westbound ramps closed to traffic. Work on a connection between the interchange and western Metro Manila would only be realized with the construction of the 2.42-kilometer (1.50 mi) NLEX Segment 9 between the interchange and the MacArthur Highway in Karuhatan, which was opened on March 19, 2015. A further extension from Karuhatan to the Port of Manila, known as NLEX Segment 10 or NLEX Harbor Link, was opened gradually from February 28, 2019, to June 15, 2020.

On November 16, 2012, Smart Communications bought the naming rights to the interchange, calling it Smart Connect Interchange until circa 2021.

On June 21, 2021, as part of a greening initiative led by NLEX Corporation, the Department of Environment and Natural Resources, and House Deputy Speaker Eric Martinez (Valenzuela–2nd), 3181 saplings were planted at the interchange.
