= Balintawak station =

Train station in Quezon City, Philippines

Coordinates: 14°39′26.44″N 121°0′14.26″E

Balintawak
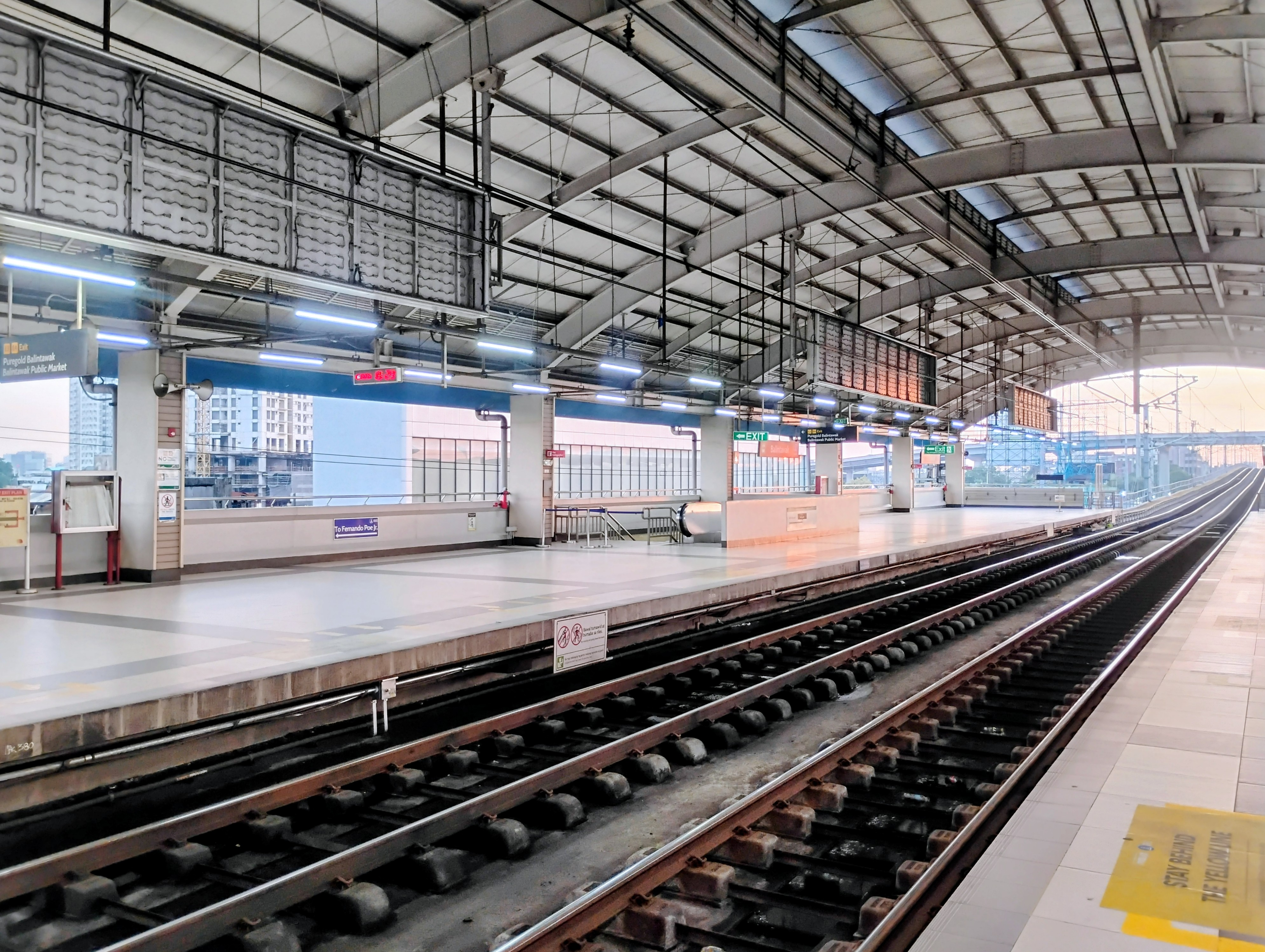

General information
- Location: 1179 EDSA, Balintawak; Quezon City, Metro Manila, Philippines
- Owner: Department of Transportation – Light Rail Transit Authority
- Operator: Light Rail Manila Corporation
- Line: LRT Line 1
- Platforms: 2 (2 side)
- Tracks: 2
- Connections: 1 Balintawak

Construction
- Structure type: Elevated
- Parking: Yes (Puregold Balintawak, Ayala Malls Cloverleaf, Juliana Wet & Dry Market)
- Accessible: Yes

Other information
- Station code: GL02

History
- Opened: March 22, 2010; 16 years ago

Services
Preceding station	Manila LRT	Following station
Fernando Poe Jr. Terminus	LRT Line 1	Monumento towards Dr. Santos
Track layout
Location
- Location within Metro Manila Location within Luzon Location within Philippines

Balintawak station is an elevated Light Rail Transit (LRT) station located on the LRT Line 1 (LRT-1) system located along EDSA at the boundary of barangays Balingasa, Unang Sigaw, and Apolonio Samson in Quezon City, Philippines. It opened on March 22, 2010 as part of the LRT-1 North Extension Project. The station serves passengers going to and from the northern parts of Luzon using the North Luzon Expressway.

Balintawak is one of two LRT-1 stations serving Quezon City, with the other being Fernando Poe Jr. It is the second station for trains headed to Dr. Santos and the twenty-fourth station for trains headed to Fernando Poe Jr.

The station is situated in front of the Balintawak Market, near the Quezon City–Caloocan boundary and the Balintawak Cloverleaf.

== History ==
Balintawak station was once planned as an intermediate station of EDSA North Transit (ENT) Link Stage 1, a separate project that would have linked the MRT Line 3's terminus at North Avenue station with the LRT Line 1 and PNR North Main Line in Caloocan. During that time, no rail lines operated along the northern section of EDSA. However, the project never came into fruition when it was replaced by the Line 1 North Extension Project, a 5.4-kilometer (3.4 mi) extension of LRT-1 to the North Avenue station as part of the MRT-LRT closing the loop project to integrate the operations of the LRT-1 and MRT-3. While Balintawak station became part of the new project, full integration did not materialize, though the opening of the North Triangle Common Station is expected to materialize this. Construction of the North Extension started in July 2008 and was completed in 2010. Balintawak station was opened on March 22, 2010. At that time, it was the temporary northern terminus of the line until the completion of Roosevelt station (now Fernando Poe Jr. station) in October 2010. It regained such status once again during the temporary closure of the station from September 2020 to December 2022 due to the construction of the North Triangle Common Station.

== Transportation links ==
There are several city buses and jeepneys plying EDSA, as well as A. Bonifacio Avenue below the Balintawak Interchange. A UV Express terminal is also found at Ayala Malls Cloverleaf. The station serves as an interchange with the EDSA Carousel, which is accessible via the emergency exits.

== Nearby landmarks ==
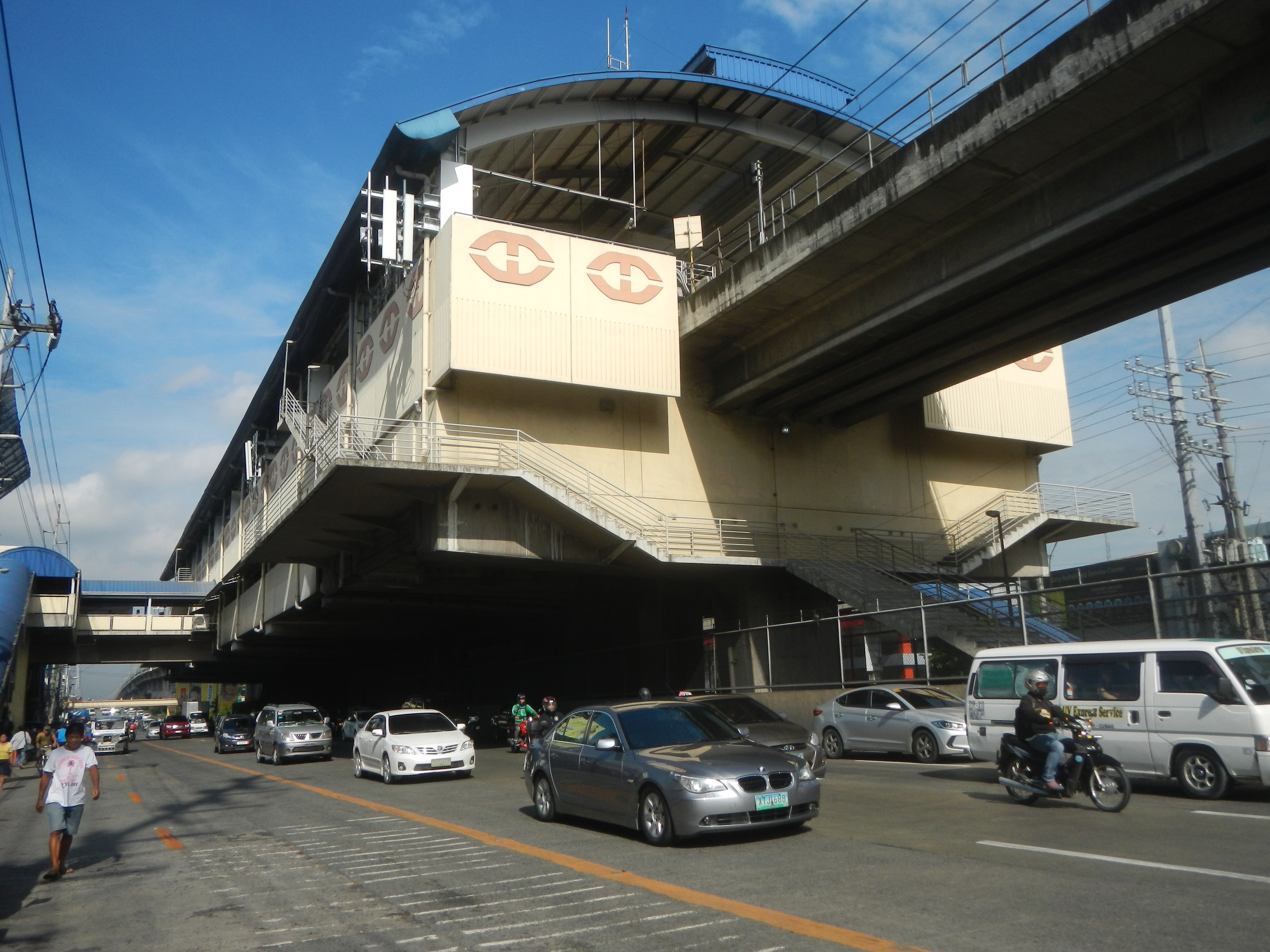
View of Balintawak station from street level

The station is close to Balintawak Market and adjacent to Puregold Balintawak. An access road to Ayala Land's Cloverleaf estate is built right beside the station. Accessing Ayala Malls Cloverleaf from the station requires riding the shuttle service stationed near the southbound entrance.

== See also ==
- List of rail transit stations in Metro Manila
- Manila Light Rail Transit System
