= Andres Bonifacio Avenue =

Major road in Metro Manila, Philippines

A. Bonifacio Avenue
- Andres Bonifacio Avenue
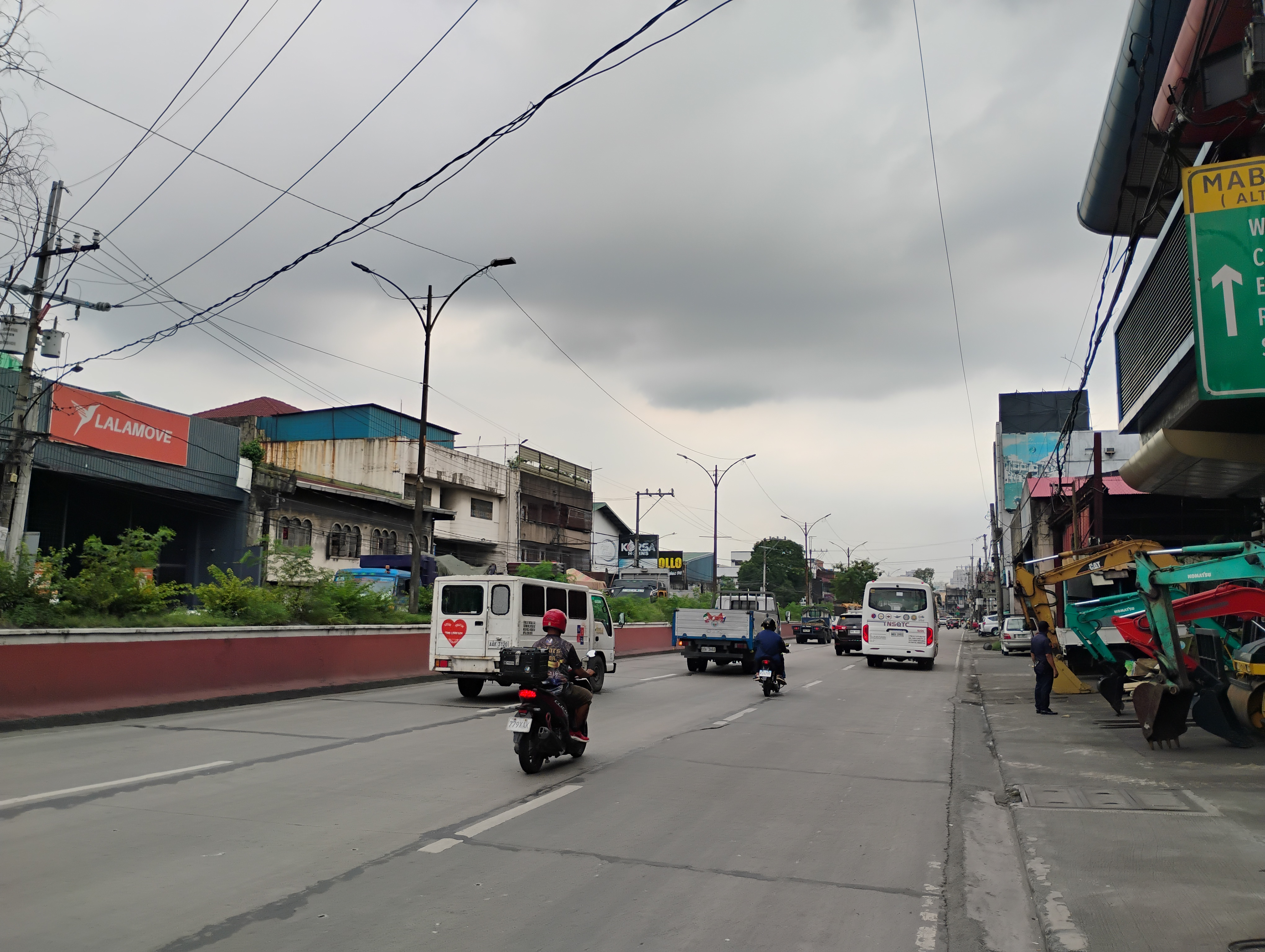
- A. Bonifacio Avenue in 2025

Route information
- Maintained by Department of Public Works and Highways – Quezon City 1st District Engineering Office
- Length: 3.784 km (2.351 mi)
- Component highways: R-8 R-8; N160

Major junctions
- North end: AH26 / N160 (North Luzon Expressway) / AH26 (Epifanio de los Santos Avenue) at Balintawak Cloverleaf in Quezon City
- N130 (5th Avenue & Sgt. Rivera Avenue)
- South end: N160 / N161 (Blumentritt Road) at Quezon City–Manila boundary

Location
- Country: Philippines
- Major cities: Quezon City and Manila

Highway system
- Roads in the Philippines; Highways; Expressways; List

Andres Bonifacio Avenue, also known as A. Bonifacio Avenue, is a 3.784-kilometer (2.351 mi) national secondary road connecting the North Luzon Expressway and Epifanio de los Santos Avenue at Balintawak Interchange in Quezon City and Blumentritt Road at the city's boundary with Manila in a north–south direction.

== Etymology ==
The road is named after the Filipino revolutionary and Supremo of the Katipunan, Andres Bonifacio, alongside other similarly named roads in Metro Manila, like those in Marikina and Intramuros.

== Route description ==
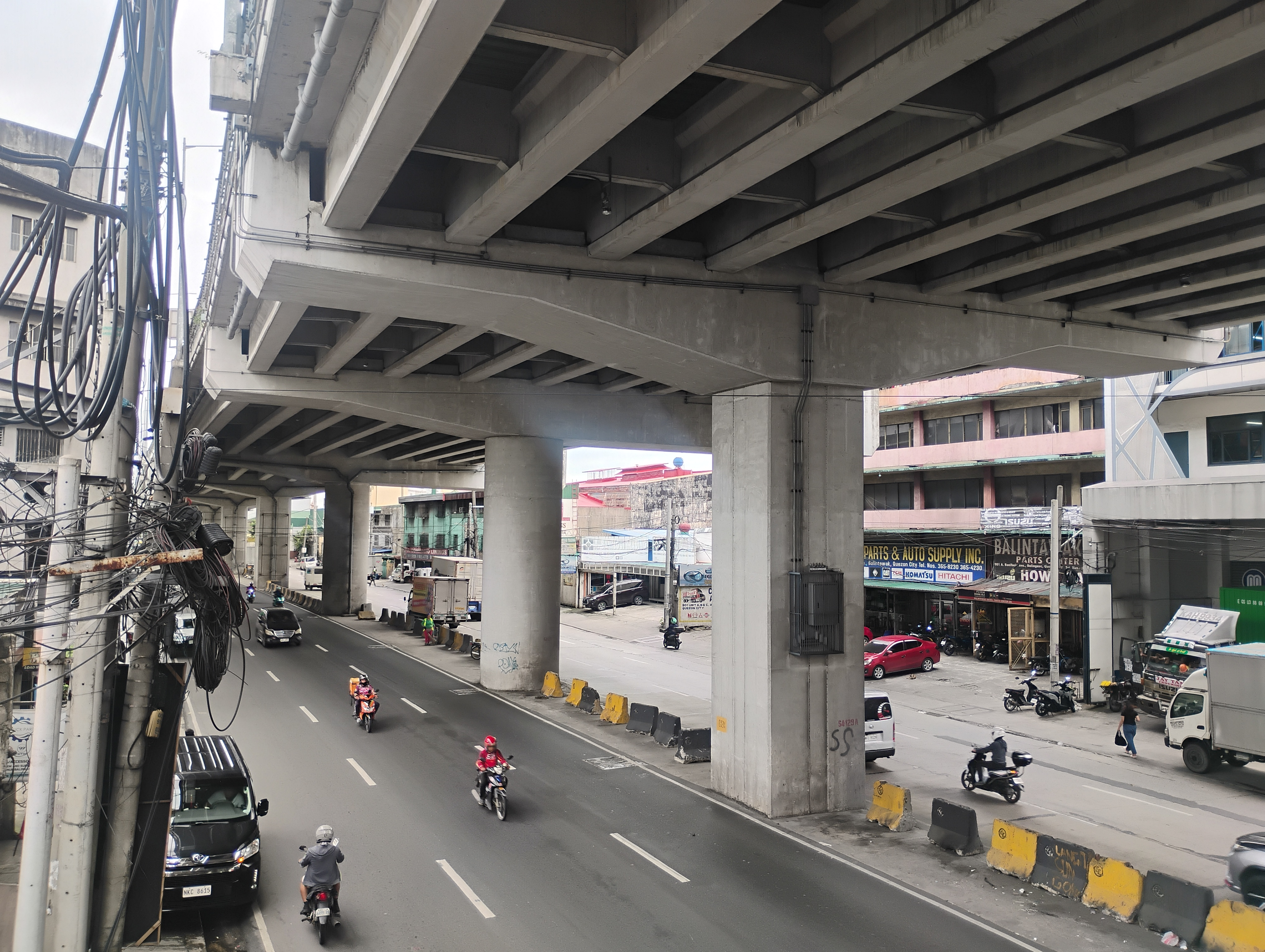
A. Bonifacio Avenue beneath Skyway Stage 3 in Balingasa

The road starts at the Balintawak Interchange in Quezon City and continues until the intersection with Del Monte Avenue and Mayon Street, where it makes a westward turn. It continues until arriving at the intersection with Blumentritt Road at the city's boundary with Manila. A segment of Skyway Stage 3 currently runs above the avenue's segment from Sgt. Rivera and 5th Avenues (C-3) to the Balintawak Interchange.

Adjacent to the Balintawak Interchange is Ayala Land's Cloverleaf complex and its shopping mall, Ayala Malls Cloverleaf. It also forms the eastern perimeter of the Manila North Cemetery from past Tagaytay Street up to Blumentritt Road.

== History ==
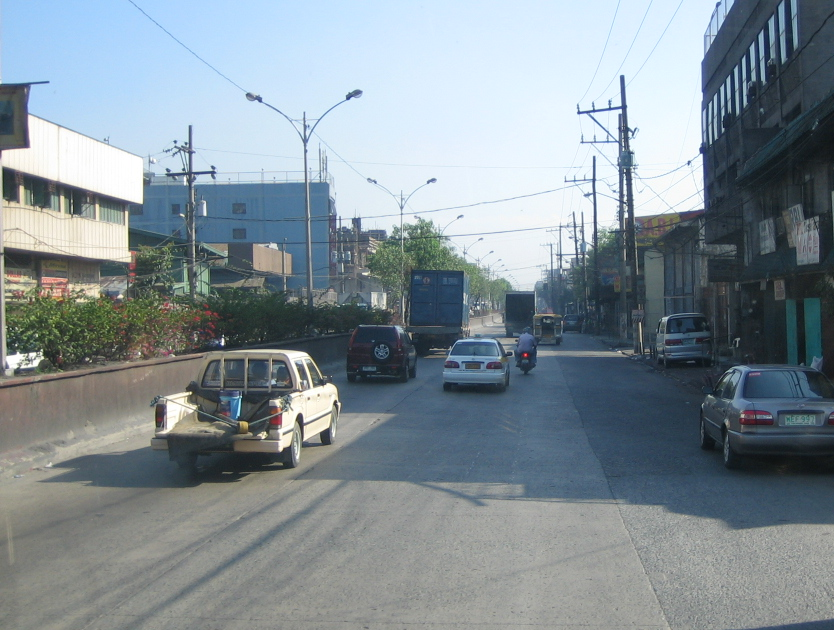
C-3–NLEX segment of Bonifacio Avenue in 2008, before the existence of Skyway Stage 3

Andres Bonifacio Avenue forms part of an old road that linked the city of Manila with Novaliches, historically called Bonifacio-Manila Road, Manila–Novaliches Road, and La Loma-Balintawak Road. It historically formed part of Route 52 or Highway 52. The portion of the road north of the present-day EDSA is presently known as Quirino Highway. The northern end of the avenue was involved in the construction of Balintawak Interchange in 1966–1968, wherein the Manila North Diversion Road was built as its new continuation to the north.

== Intersections ==
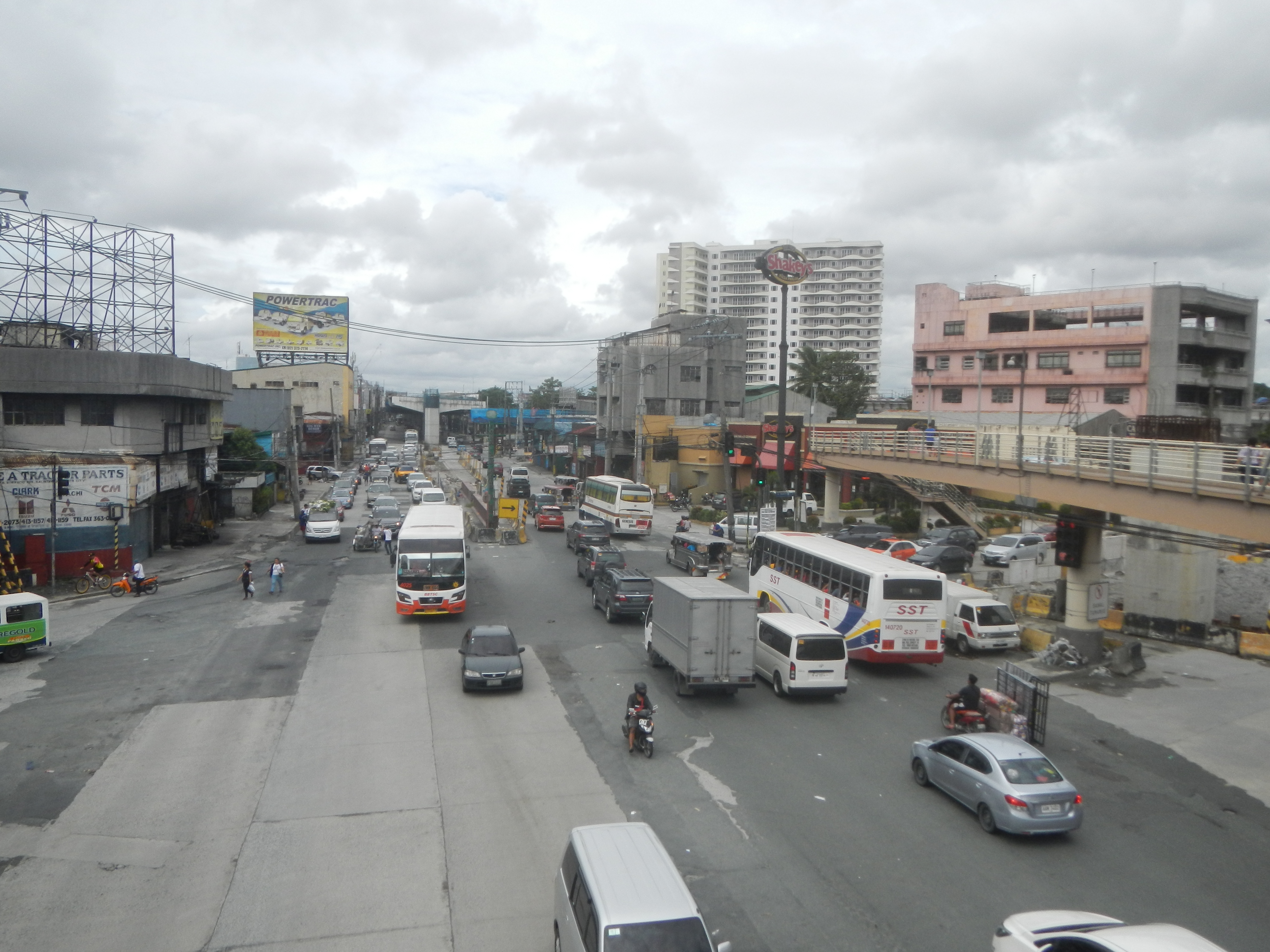
Intersection of A. Bonifacio and C-3 (5th Avenue & Sgt. Rivera Avenue)

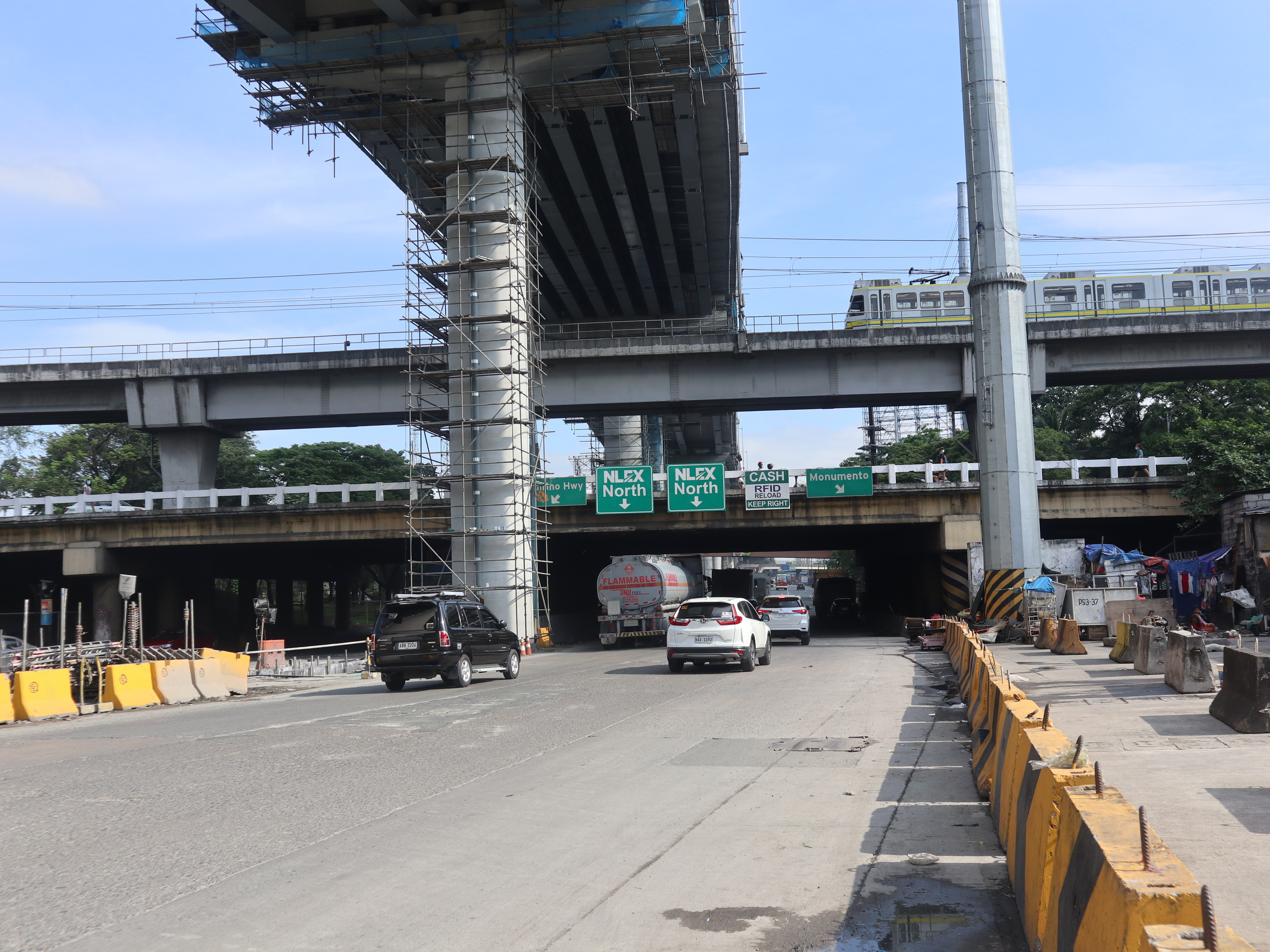
Northern end of A. Bonifacio at Balintawak Interchange

Province	City/Municipality	km	mi	Destinations	Notes
Quezon City				AH26 (EDSA) – Cubao, Monumento	Balintawak Cloverleaf, northern terminus. Continues north as AH26 / N160 (NLEX).
Quezon City				Sto. Cristo Street	Northbound only.
Quezon City				Skyway	A. Bonifacio Exit of Skyway Stage 3; northbound entrance and southbound exit.
Quezon City				Dorotea Road	Southbound only.
Quezon City				Bignay Street	Northbound only.
Quezon City				11th Avenue	Southbound only.
Quezon City				Balingasa Road	Northbound only.
Quezon City				Marvex Drive	Unsignaled intersection.
Quezon City				Bo Galino Street	Southbound only.
Quezon City				Selecta Drive	Unsignaled intersection.
Quezon City				P. Gonzales Street	Southbound only. Accessible only to small vehicles & pedestrians.
Quezon City				7th Avenue	Traffic light intersection.
Quezon City				J. Pineda Street	Northbound only.
Quezon City				Ligaya Street	Southbound only.
Quezon City				6th Avenue	Southbound only.
Quezon City				Mithi Street	Northbound only.
Quezon City				N130 (5th Avenue / Sgt. Rivera Avenue)	Traffic light interchange. No left turn from vehicles coming from NLEx.
Quezon City				Dome Street	Access to opposite segments provided by nearby U-turn slots/intersections.
Quezon City				Mauban Street	Traffic light intersection.
Quezon City				G. Roxas Street	Northbound only.
Quezon City				Binhagan Street	No right turn from A. Bonifacio Avenue.
Quezon City				Pag-asa Street, Del Monte Avenue	Traffic light intersection.
Quezon City				Agudo Street	Southbound only.
Quezon City				Apo Street	Unsignaled intersection.
Quezon City				Sta. Catalina Street	Unsignaled intersection. U-turn not allowed.
Quezon City				Binuang Street	Northbound only.
Quezon City				Magnas Street	Northbound only.
Quezon City				Scout Oscar M. Alcaraz (Morong) Street	Unsignaled intersection. U-turn not allowed.
Quezon City				Wakat Street	Northbound only.
Quezon City				Mayo Street	Unsignaled intersection.
Quezon City				Malaya Street	Northbound only.
Quezon City				Lunas Street	Northbound only.
Quezon City				Malindang Street	Unsignaled intersection.
Quezon City				Ipo Street	Northbound only.
Quezon City				General Tinio Street	Unsignaled intersection.
Quezon City				Abao Street	Northbound only.
Quezon City				Bulusan Street	Northbound only.
Quezon City				Labo Street	Unsignaled intersection.
Quezon City				Isarog Street	Northbound only.
Quezon City				Iriga Street	Unsignaled intersection.
Quezon City				Dr. Alejos Street	Northbound only.
Quezon City				Iba Street	Northbound only.
Quezon City				Mariveles Street	Unsignaled intersection.
Quezon City—Manila boundary				Calavite Street, N160 / N161 (Blumentritt Road)	Southern terminus. Right turn only from A. Bonifacio Avenue.
1.000 mi = 1.609 km; 1.000 km = 0.621 mi: Incomplete access

== Landmarks ==
This is listed from north to south:

- Balintawak Interchange
- Balintawak Market
- Ayala Malls Cloverleaf
- Bonifacio Market
- Manila North Cemetery
