= Balingasa =

Barangay in Quezon City, Metro Manila, Philippines

Balingasa Balintawak Cloverleaf
- Barangay
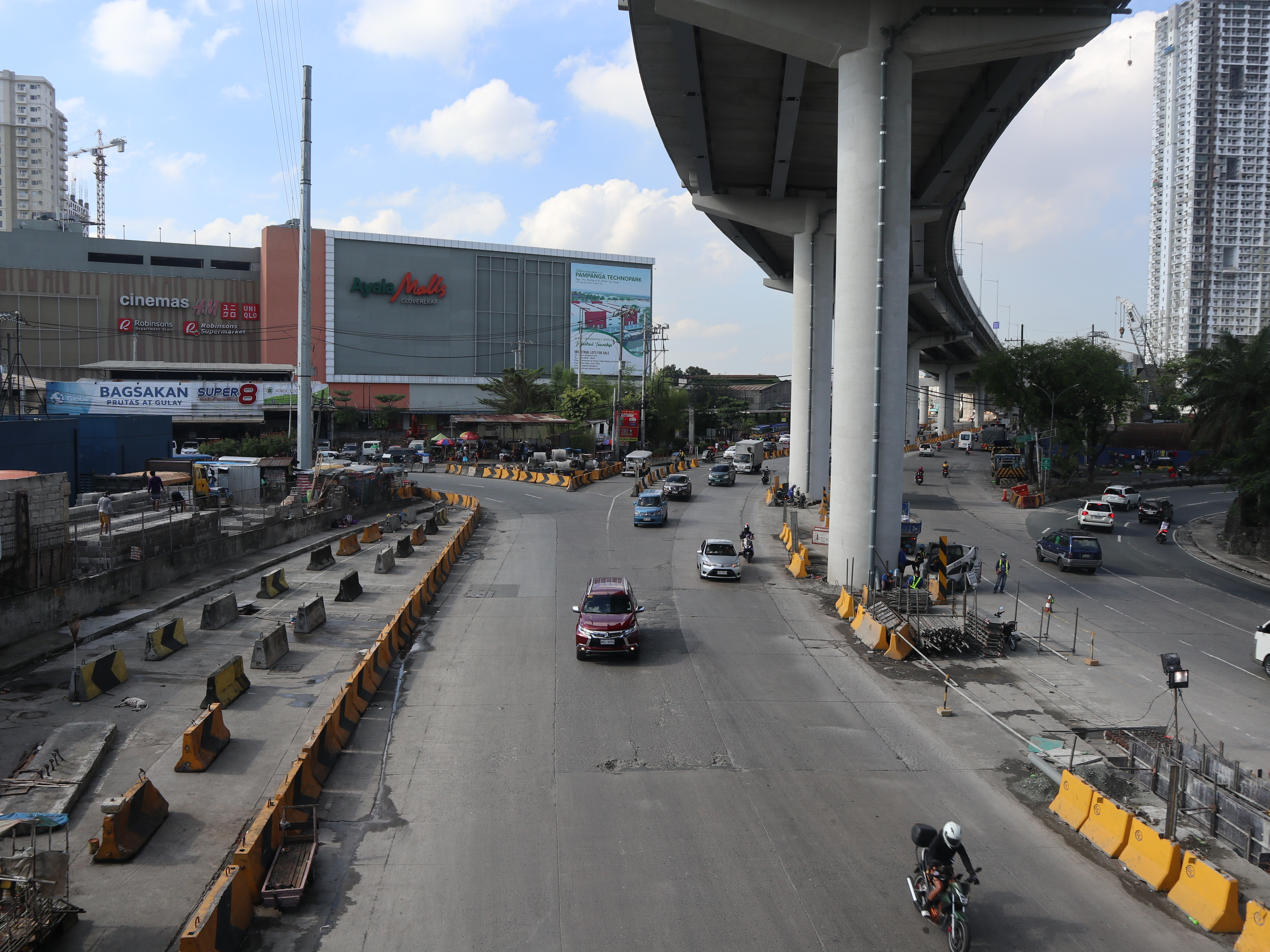
- A. Bonifacio Avenue south of Balintawak Interchange with Ayala Malls Cloverleaf on the background
- Interactive map of Balingasa
- Coordinates: 14°39′2″N 121°0′5″E
- Country: Philippines
- Region: National Capital Region
- City: Quezon City
- District: 1st District of Quezon City

Government
  - Type: Barangay
  - Barangay Captain: Ma. Teresa Montalbo

Area
  - Total: 0.8111 km^{2} (0.3132 sq mi)

Population (2020)
  - Total: 19,260
  - Density: 23,750/km^{2} (61,500/sq mi)
- Time zone: UTC+8 (PST)
- Postal Code: 1105
- Area code: 2
- PSGC: 137404013
- Website: Facebook

Balingasa, commonly known as Balintawak and Cloverleaf, is an urban barangay in Quezon City, Metro Manila, Philippines. It is located at Quezon City's western boundary with Caloocan.

The barangay's borders are defined by EDSA and barangay Unang Sigaw to the north, barangays Pag-Ibig Sa Nayon and Damar to the south, barangay Manresa and Gregorio Araneta Avenue in the southeast, and barangay Apolonio Samson in the east.

== Etymology ==
Following the Second World War, the inhabitants of the area rebuilt their houses and man-made artesian wells, locally known in Tagalog as a balon, were dug as a primary source of water. After one such well was dug, crystal-clear spring water came out of the other wells. This well had its base made out of small pieces of stones, known as gasang, and was referred to by the settlers as the balun ng gasang (gasang well). The balun ng gasang became a common byword of households in the area and was often mispronounced as balungasa, until it was later commonly pronounced as balingasa.

== History ==
During the Spanish colonial era, the area was a densely forested area. Upon the arrival of settlers, through the native kaingin method of slash-and-burn cultivation, the once-forested area was cultivated into fields and farms where different cereals and vegetables were planted. The area was established as a barrio of Caloocan in 1882, with Catalino Magsalin as its first teniente del barrio, also known as the cabeza de barangay.

After the formation of the new Philippine capital of Quezon City, the barrio was incorporated into the new city in 1939 pursuant to Commonwealth Act No. 502, transferring Balingasa and other nearby Caloocan sitios and barrios to Quezon City.

The barrio was recognized as a barangay in 1975 by Quezon City Mayor Norberto S. Amoranto.

== Notable landmarks ==
A monument commemorating the Cry of Balintawak or Cry of Pugad Lawin, which marked the start of the Philippine Revolution in 1896, was erected in the area, but has since been relocated.

The Balintawak Interchange, a cloverleaf-shaped road network, links the North Luzon Expressway (NLEX) and the Epifanio delos Santos Avenue (EDSA) under the jurisdiction of both barangays Balingasa and Unang Sigaw.

Additionally, Skyway Stage 3 passes above A. Bonifacio Avenue, connecting South Luzon Expressway (SLEX) and NLEX.

=== North EDSA corridor ===
Other notable landmarks (mostly along EDSA) include the Balintawak Market, the LRT Balintawak station and transport hubs to and from Downtown Manila, Northern Quezon City, CAMANAVA and Bulacan areas.

The Cloverleaf, an Ayala Land estate and the former site of Central Textile Mills purchased in 2013, is predominantly within the area of Balingasa while the rest is under the jurisdiction of barangay Apolonio Samson. Once fully developed, the township will include Alveo and Avida Land residential condominiums, a Qualimed hospital facility, commercial buildings for Business Process Outsourcing (BPO) locators and Ayala Malls Cloverleaf (opened on October 25, 2017).

Another condominium project, The Celandine project of DMCI Properties, is located just south of The Cloverleaf along A. Bonifacio Avenue.

The entrance to the Manila Electric Company (Meralco) and National Grid Corporation of the Philippines (NGCP) Balintawak substation, which hosts various distribution and transmission lines operated and maintained by Meralco and NGCP such as the Sucat–Paco–Araneta–Balintawak and Hermosa–Duhat–Balintawak transmission lines, is also located along EDSA.

== Demography ==
As of the 2020 census of the National Statistics Office (Philippines), the population of Balingasa is 19,260.

== Facilities ==
The barangay maintains a Quezon City public library, while the government-run Balingasa High School is under the Schools Division Office (SDO) of Quezon City.

== See also ==
- Barangays of Quezon City
- Balintawak Interchange
- Cry of Pugad Lawin
- Andres Bonifacio Avenue
- Media related to Balingasa (A. Bonifacio Kalapati), Quezon City at Wikimedia Commons
