= Balintawak Interchange =

Cloverleaf interchange in Quezon City, Philippines

- Balintawak Cloverleaf
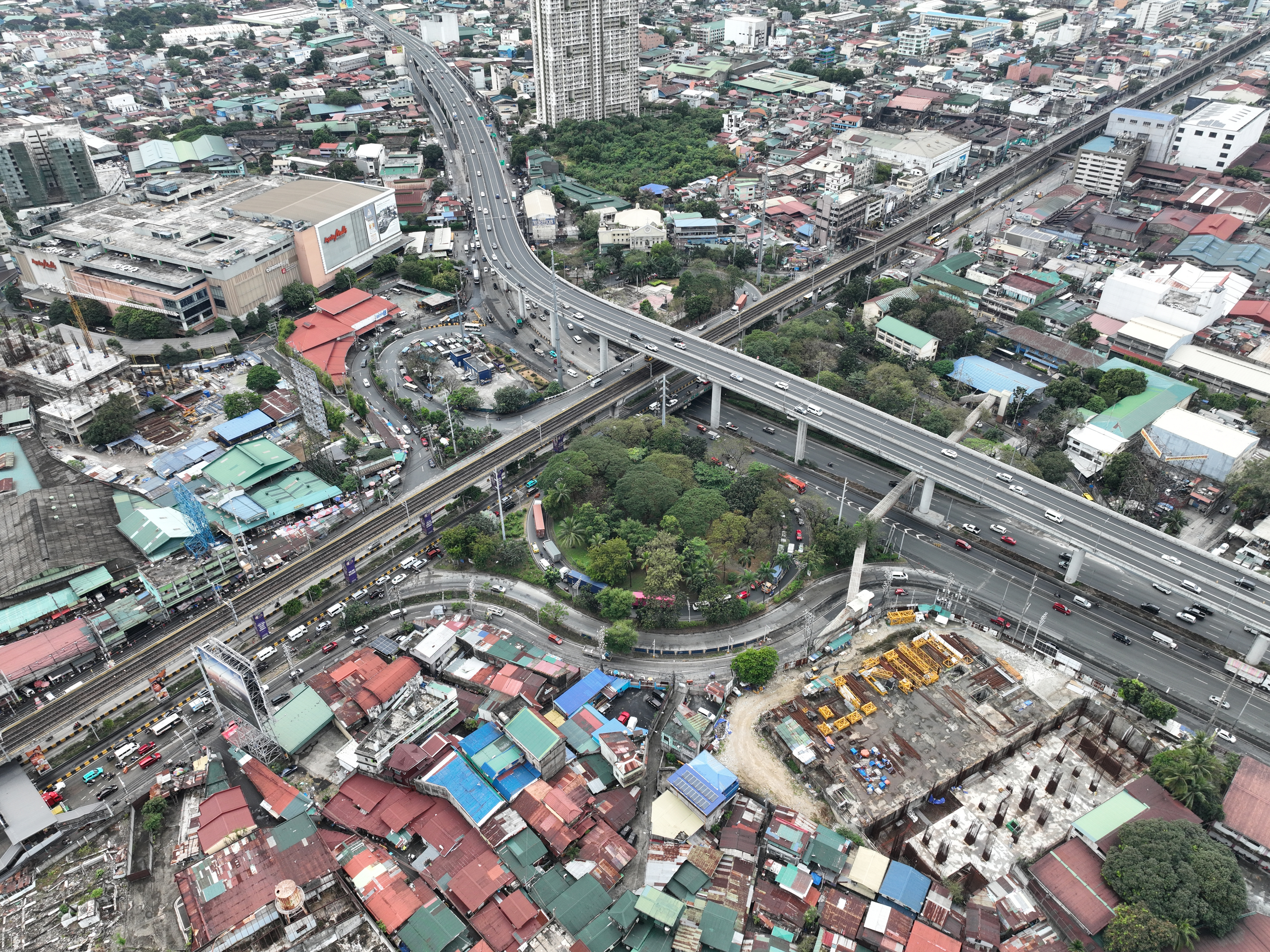
- Balintawak Interchange in 2026
- Interactive map of Balintawak Interchange

Location
- Balingasa and Unang Sigaw, Quezon City, Metro Manila, Philippines
- Coordinates: 14°39′26.6″N 121°0′0.7″E
- Roads at junction: AH26 (EDSA); AH26 / N160 (North Luzon Expressway); N160 (A. Bonifacio Avenue)

Construction
- Type: Two-level cloverleaf interchange
- Constructed: 1966 by the Construction and Development Corporation of the Philippines
- Opened: August 4, 1968
- Maintained by: Department of Public Works and Highways; NLEX Corporation

The Balintawak Interchange (/bɑːlɪntaʊwɑːk/), also known as the Balintawak Cloverleaf, is a two-level cloverleaf interchange in Quezon City, Metro Manila, Philippines, which serves as the junction between Epifanio de los Santos Avenue (EDSA) and the North Luzon Expressway (NLEX). Opened in 1968 as part of the initial 28-kilometer (17 mi) NLEX segment between Quezon City and Guiguinto, Bulacan, it was one of the first projects of the Construction and Development Corporation of the Philippines (now the Philippine National Construction Corporation or PNCC).

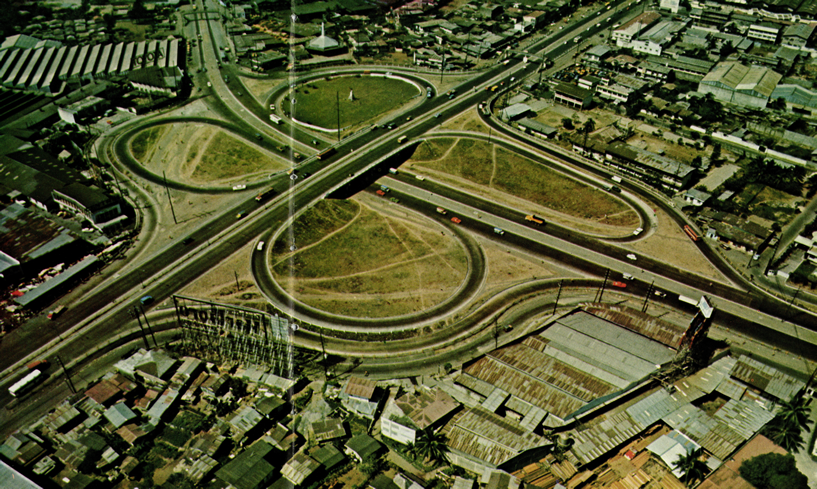
The Balintawak Interchange in 1968

Construction of the interchange was precipitated by the large number of motor vehicles in Manila and the surrounding suburbs in the 1960s, contributing to significant traffic congestion. On June 25, 1966, President Ferdinand Marcos ordered the Department of Public Works to construct some road projects to be financed through World War II reparations, including interchanges on vital intersections along EDSA. This order led to the construction of this interchange, replacing a previous roundabout between EDSA, A. Bonifacio Avenue, and Quirino Highway, and the Magallanes Interchange between EDSA and the South Luzon Expressway (SLEX), which opened in 1975. A shrine to Andres Bonifacio was later built inside the interchange, which underwent a ₱13 million renovation in 2009.

Flooding around the Balintawak Interchange is a problem, with the interchange being named in 2014 as one of the 22 most flood-prone roadways in Metro Manila. In 2015, the Manila North Tollways Corporation, the concessionaire of NLEX, spent close to ₱70 million to improve the interchange's drainage systems to mitigate flooding. In addition to flooding, the interchange has been criticized by columnist Cito Beltran of The Philippine Star for being rife with corrupt police officers and petty crime.

Apart from the wet markets and drop-off points for goods from the north, Ayala Malls Cloverleaf and the entire Cloverleaf complex are located southeast of the interchange. Balintawak station on the LRT-1 serves the location east of the interchange.
