= North Luzon Expressway =

Major expressway in Luzon, Philippines

R-8 North Luzon Expressway

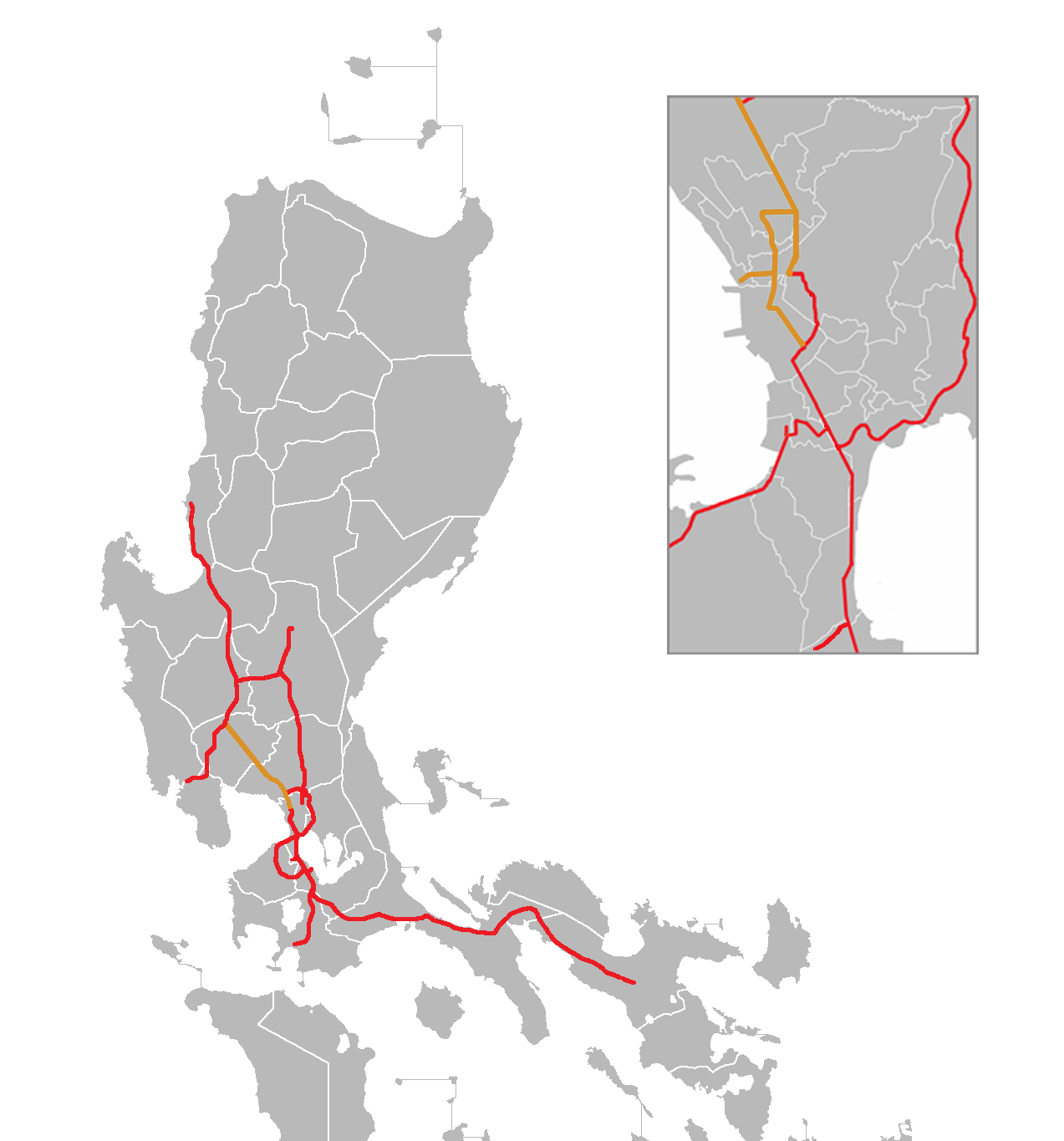
- Map of expressways in Luzon, with the North Luzon Expressway in orange

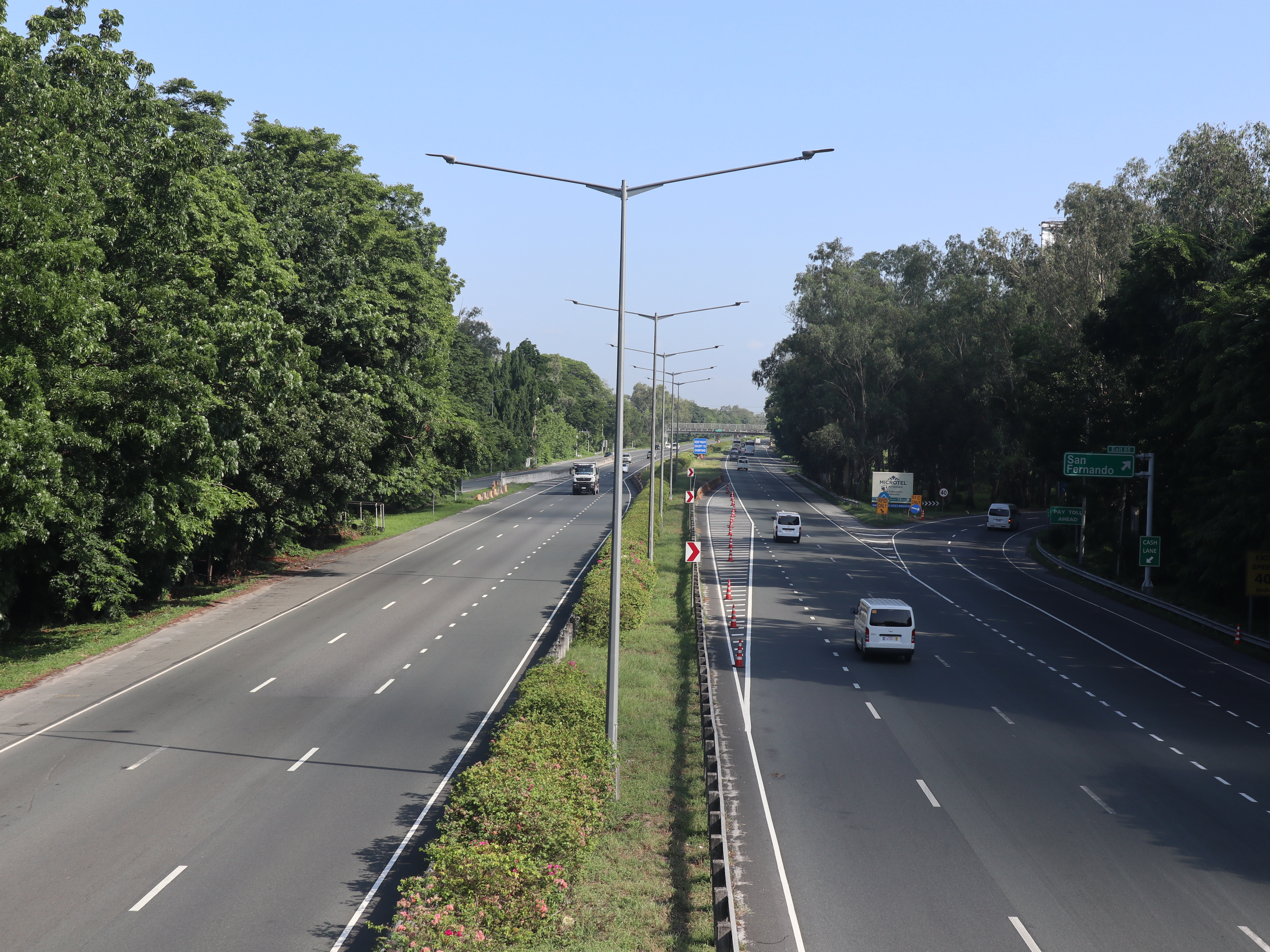
- The expressway in San Fernando, Pampanga

Route information
- Part of AH26
- Maintained by NLEX Corporation
- Length: 84 km (52 mi)
- Existed: 1968–present
- Component highways: E1; AH26 from Balintawak to Santa Rita, Guiguinto, Bulacan; N160 in Quezon City and Caloocan; R-8 R-8 from Balintawak Interchange to SCTEX
- Restrictions: No motorcycles below 400cc

Major junctions
- North end: N213 (Mabalacat–Magalang Road) / Mabalacat Bypass Road in Mabalacat
- E1 (Subic–Clark–Tarlac Expressway) in Mabalacat; N3 (Jose Abad Santos Avenue) in San Fernando; AH26 (Pan-Philippine Highway) in Guiguinto, Bulacan; N247 (Plaridel Bypass Road) in Balagtas, Bulacan; E5 (NLEX Harbor Link) in Valenzuela
- South end: AH26 (EDSA) / N160 (A. Bonifacio Avenue) at Balintawak Interchange, Quezon City

Location
- Country: Philippines
- Regions: Central Luzon; Metro Manila
- Provinces: Bulacan; Pampanga
- Major cities: Angeles City; Caloocan; Mabalacat; Malabon; Malolos; Meycauayan; San Fernando; Quezon City; Valenzuela
- Towns: Apalit; Balagtas; Bocaue; Calumpit; Guiguinto; Marilao; Mexico; Plaridel; Pulilan; San Simon; Santo Tomas

Highway system
- Roads in the Philippines; Highways; Expressways; List

The North Luzon Expressway (NLEX) (Note: Formerly known as the Manila North Diversion Road (MNDR), North Super Highway (NSH), Manila North Expressway (MNEX), and North Luzon Tollway (NLT).) is a 84-kilometer-long (52 mi) controlled-access highway that connects Metro Manila to the provinces of the Central Luzon region in the Philippines. The expressway travels from its southern terminus at Balintawak Interchange in Quezon City to its northern terminus at Santa Ines Interchange in Mabalacat, Pampanga. The Balintawak Interchange is adjacent to NLEX's connection to the Skyway, an elevated toll road that connects NLEX to its counterpart in the south, the South Luzon Expressway (SLEX). It is a component of Expressway 1 (E1) of the Philippine expressway network, and is partially signed as National Route 160 (N160) (Note: N160 and R-8 also apply to the expressway's untolled segment from Balintawak Interchange in Quezon City to beneath the Balintawak/NLEX exit of the Skyway, near the former site of the Balintawak toll plaza, in Caloocan. According to the Department of Public Works and Highways, this segment is officially designated as a secondary road called the Manila North Diversion Road and is maintained by the Quezon City 1st District Engineering Office.) of the Philippine highway network and Radial Road 8 (R-8) of Metro Manila's arterial road network. (Note: These designations only apply to the main segment of the NLEX.) The segment between Santa Rita exit in Guiguinto, Bulacan, and the Balintawak Interchange is part of Asian Highway 26 (AH26) of the Asian Highway Network.

The North Luzon Expressway was built in the 1960s as part of the government's program to develop areas adjacent to Metro Manila. The expressway was originally controlled by the Philippine National Construction Corporation (PNCC), until its operations and maintenance were transferred on February 10, 2005, to the NLEX Corporation, a subsidiary of Metro Pacific Investments (a former subsidiary of Lopez Holdings Corporation until August 2008). The expressway was expanded and rehabilitated from 2003 to February 2005, modernizing the road and its facilities.

== Route description ==
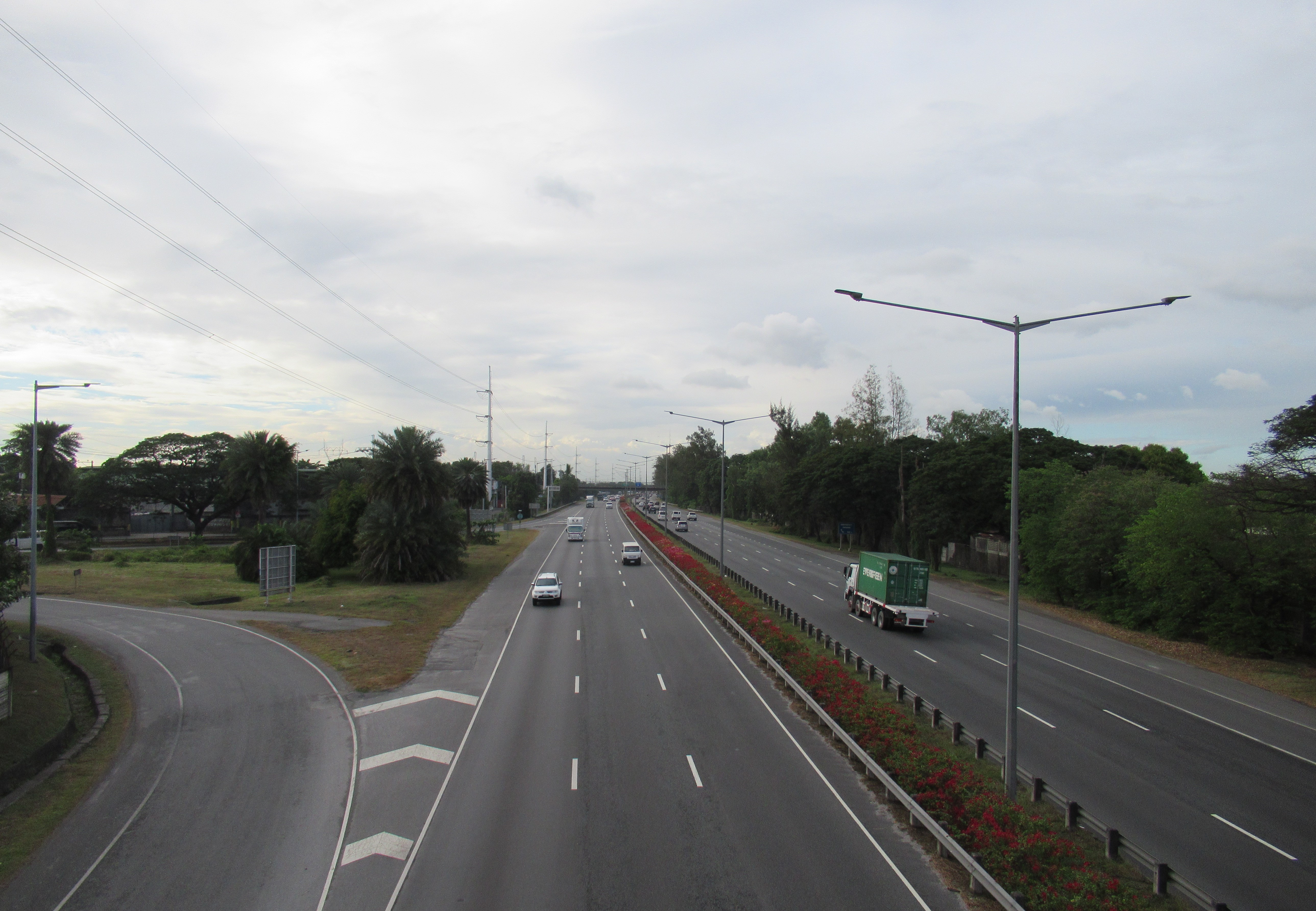
NLEX near the Santa Rita interchange in Guiguinto

The North Luzon Expressway's main segment, called the North Luzon Tollway (NLT) or NLEX Main, runs northwards from Quezon City to the provinces of Central Luzon. The main segment is also known as Phase 1.

The expressway begins in Quezon City as a four-lane road at the Balintawak Interchange with EDSA as a continuation of A. Bonifacio Avenue. The main segment spans 84 km (52 miles), passing through Caloocan and Valenzuela in Metro Manila and the provinces of Bulacan and Pampanga in Central Luzon. It currently ends in Mabalacat. The NLEX runs parallel to the MacArthur Highway, which is officially known as the Manila North Road.

From Balintawak, the NLEX follows a straight northward route, with sections lined by billboards. Two service roads run on either side of the expressway from Balintawak to Lias, Marilao, albeit discontinuously, and one service road runs on the west from Marilao Exit to Duhat, Bocaue. The N160 concurrency ends at the city boundaries of Caloocan and Malabon, near the Eternal Gardens Memorial Park and just below the Skyway and its Balintawak Exit, and a few meters south of the former site of the Balintawak toll plaza, which operated until 2005. The expressway then bends westward at Harbor Link Interchange in Valenzuela and later at Tambubong Interchange in Bocaue, Bulacan.

The following exit, Tabang, leads to the Tabang Spur Road. The Tabang Spur Road is a four-lane, 3.36-kilometer (2.09 mi) spur road in Bulacan that branches off NLEX Main at Tabang Exit in Balagtas and terminates at a partial cloverleaf interchange with MacArthur Highway and Cagayan Valley Road at Guiguinto Exit in Guiguinto. The spur road carried the final leg of the expressway until the present route was extended to Pampanga.

The expressway narrows to three lanes per direction past Tabang Exit. It continues on a straight route, traversing paddy fields on the outskirts of Guiguinto, Malolos, and Pulilan. The Asian Highway 26 (AH26) concurrency leaves NLEX at Santa Rita Exit, where it follows Maharlika Highway, also known as Cagayan Valley Road, towards Baliwag and Cagayan Valley. A few meters after Pulilan Exit is the Candaba Viaduct. The bridge traverses rice paddies and swampland in the municipalities of Pulilan and Calumpit in Bulacan and Apalit in Pampanga, and crosses Apalit Bypass Road and Pampanga River before the viaduct ends. The expressway continues on a straight alignment. After San Fernando Exit, the expressway narrows into two lanes per direction. It continues a mostly straight and gently winding route through the rural areas of Mexico, crossing Abacan and Quitangil rivers, and traversing the eastern parts of Angeles and Mabalacat. NLEX connects with the Subic–Clark–Tarlac Expressway (SCTEX) via the Clark Spur Road before the main line approaches its final toll plaza and terminates at the Santa Ines Interchange, where it continues to the north as the Mabalacat Bypass Road.

=== NLEX Harbor Link ===
Collectively known as the NLEX Harbor Link Project (Phase 2), these expressways connect the North Luzon Expressway to various points in Metro Manila. It currently runs from Mindanao Avenue in Valenzuela to Radial Road 10 in Navotas, linking the North Luzon Expressway to the Port of Manila. Once completed, it will run from Katipunan Avenue, a component of Circumferential Road 5 (C-5), in Quezon City in the east.

== History ==
=== Planning and construction ===
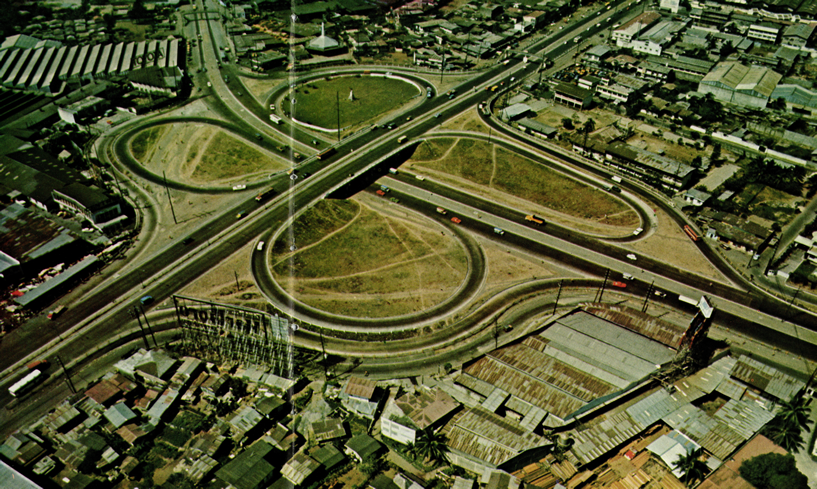
Balintawak Interchange in 1968

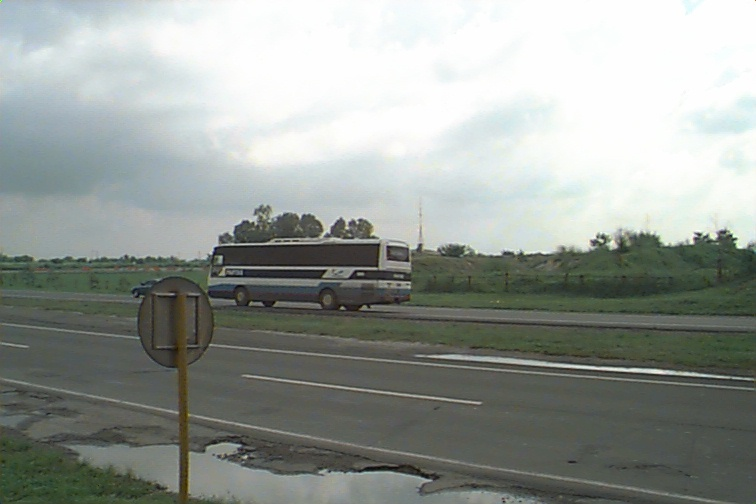
A segment of NLEX in 1999, with a passing Partas bus

Construction of the North Luzon Expressway, then known as the Manila North Diversion Road, and later renamed as the Manila North Expressway, began in 1962 with the initial segment from Balintawak to Canumay, Valenzuela, built by local construction firm Philrock (later merged with EEI Corporation in 2000). The segment was later extended to Guiguinto, Bulacan, by the Philippine Army, with both projects funded by the government. Following the passage of the Private Financing Act of 1966, the Construction and Development Corporation of the Philippines (CDCP), later renamed the Philippine National Construction Corporation (PNCC), took over the unfinished portions and constructed the southbound lane from Tabang to Canumay in 1967. The project was also funded by the United States Agency for International Development (USAID).

In June 1968, a portion of the North Diversion Road passing through the province of Bulacan was renamed as the Marcelo H. del Pilar Highway. The original stretch of the highway, from the then-newly opened Balintawak Interchange in Quezon City, located then in the province of Rizal, before passing Caloocan, also in Rizal, up to Guiguinto Exit, was completed on August 4 of the same year. It is a fully fenced limited-access highway that consisted of a four-lane rural divided roadway, nine twin bridges, one railroad overpass, seven underpasses, and three interchanges. The executive order was signed to designate the highway as a toll road.

Originally a project of the Department of Public Works and Highways, the completion of the major portion of the job fell on the CDCP, the precursor to PNCC to pioneer the toll concept of funding infrastructure.

Additional work required by the government included the construction of the Balintawak – Novaliches Interchange Complex, the Tabang Interchange, and the approach road of the underpasses.

In 1970, the highway was renamed again as the Marcelo H. del Pilar Expressway.

Work on the extension started in April 1974, leading to its official opening by President Ferdinand Marcos in Pulilan on May 17, 1977. It was completed in August of the same year. The route, consisting of 50.9 kilometers (31.6 mi) of concrete road, was built as part of a highways program of the International Bank for Reconstruction and Development (World Bank) linking major urban centers to the production centers in the north. The project features a 4-lane limited-access highway with a 5-kilometer (3.1 mi) Candaba Viaduct, a construction innovation utilizing precast beam system, 6 interchanges, 12 bridges, and overpass/underpass structures. The original plan of the expressway's extension was supposed to end at Tarlac, which was conceptualized before the construction began.

In 1989, the expressway was extended by another 5 kilometers (3.1 mi) from its terminus at Dau Exit to Santa Ines Exit in Mabalacat, Pampanga, with a northbound lane from Dau Exit to the future connection to SCTEX had an asphalt overlay while the southbound lane was originally a concrete road before an asphalt overlay was added upon the expressway's rehabilitation.

=== Planned extension to Pangasinan and La Union ===
Early in the plans that would have extended the expressway beyond its northern terminus in Mabalacat, Pampanga, towards the Ilocos region. These various different proposals have been made throughout the years.

In 1977, President Marcos signed a presidential decree that proposes an expressway extension to Rosales, Pangasinan. They later mentioned it again in 1983. In 1989, the PNCC proposed an extension of the expressway, totaling by 20 kilometers (12 mi) from Mabalacat to Capas, Tarlac, and 82 kilometers (51 mi) to Rosales.

In 1994, Italian-Thai Development proposed the extension of the North Luzon Tollway to Pangasinan and La Union, as well as the widening of the expressway from four to eight lanes under the build-operate-transfer scheme.

The PNCC–Italian-Thai joint venture proposes an extension of the expressway has four segments:

- Mabalacat to Paniqui - 50.29 kilometers (31.25 mi)
- Paniqui to Carmen, Rosales - 24.05 kilometers (14.94 mi)
- Carmen, Rosales to Pugo - 60 kilometers (37 mi)
- Pugo to Baguio - 45 kilometers (28 mi)

However, the agreement turned into a deadlock, and Congressman Mike Defensor was assailed for imputing motivations to Speaker Jose de Venecia Jr. for resolving, and also, Benpres (now Lopez Holdings Corporation), which involved the rehabilitation and expansion of the expressway, was planned to include the extension to Pangasinan and La Union with agreement as its revision.

On December 30, 1996, the Japanese firm Itochu reached an agreement with the PNCC to construct the extension of the expressway to Pangasinan, and a feasibility study was carried out. Meanwhile, the route has a total length of 88 kilometers (55 mi) from Mabalacat to Urdaneta, Pangasinan, with a planned extension to La Union.

Filipinas Dravo Corporation also made a study on the expressway extension that would extend to San Fernando, La Union, totaling 162 kilometers (101 mi) in the same year and proposed it in the 1997 master plan. One year later, the Medium-term Philippine Development Plan proposed a 98-kilometer (61 mi) extension of the expressway. Later, in 1999, it was reported that Leighton was interested in the project.

When the proposal was not realized, the extension of the expressway was split into two expressways, the Subic–Clark–Tarlac Expressway and its segment between Clark and Tarlac City, and the Tarlac–Pangasinan–La Union Expressway. No new proposals have made since then.

=== Expansion and rehabilitation ===
The San Fernando toll plaza in 2001, few years before the rehabilitation

On April 30, 1998, the MNTC was granted the concession for the expressway, manifested in a Supplementary Toll Operation Agreement (STOA). Under the STOA, the government confirmed the assignment by PNCC of its usufructuary rights, interest and privileges over the existing expressway, including all extensions, linkages and diversions in favor of MNTC. These concession rights authorized MNTC to construct, finance, manage, operate and maintain all the project roads and charge tolls thereon.

From February 2003 to February 2005, the expressway underwent a major rehabilitation. Works included the widening of the Balintawak–Tabang segment from 6 to 8 lanes and the Tabang–Sta. Rita segment from 4 to 6 lanes, asphalt overlay, and the demolition of old tollbooths. The main contractor of the rehabilitation work was Leighton Asia with Egis as the main subcontractor for the toll, telecommunication and traffic management systems. To help maintain the safety and quality of the expressway, various rules are in effect, such as restricting the left lane to passing vehicles only and banning overloaded trucks. On February 10, 2005, commercial operations began following the Toll Regulatory Board's issuance of the Toll Operation Permit. On the same day, the operation and maintenance of the expressway was transferred from the government-owned PNCC to the privately owned MNTC, which would later become known as NLEX Corporation.

On February 12, 2007, the entire stretch of the expressway began another rehabilitation regarding its drainage systems. Within this period, certain lanes of the road were closed to the traffic. This in turn caused massive traffic jams along the road and the speed limit on the construction sites were reduced from 80 km/h (50 mph) and 100 km/h (62 mph), respectively, to 60 km/h (37 mph). The program was finished on October 7, 2007.

=== Further extensions ===
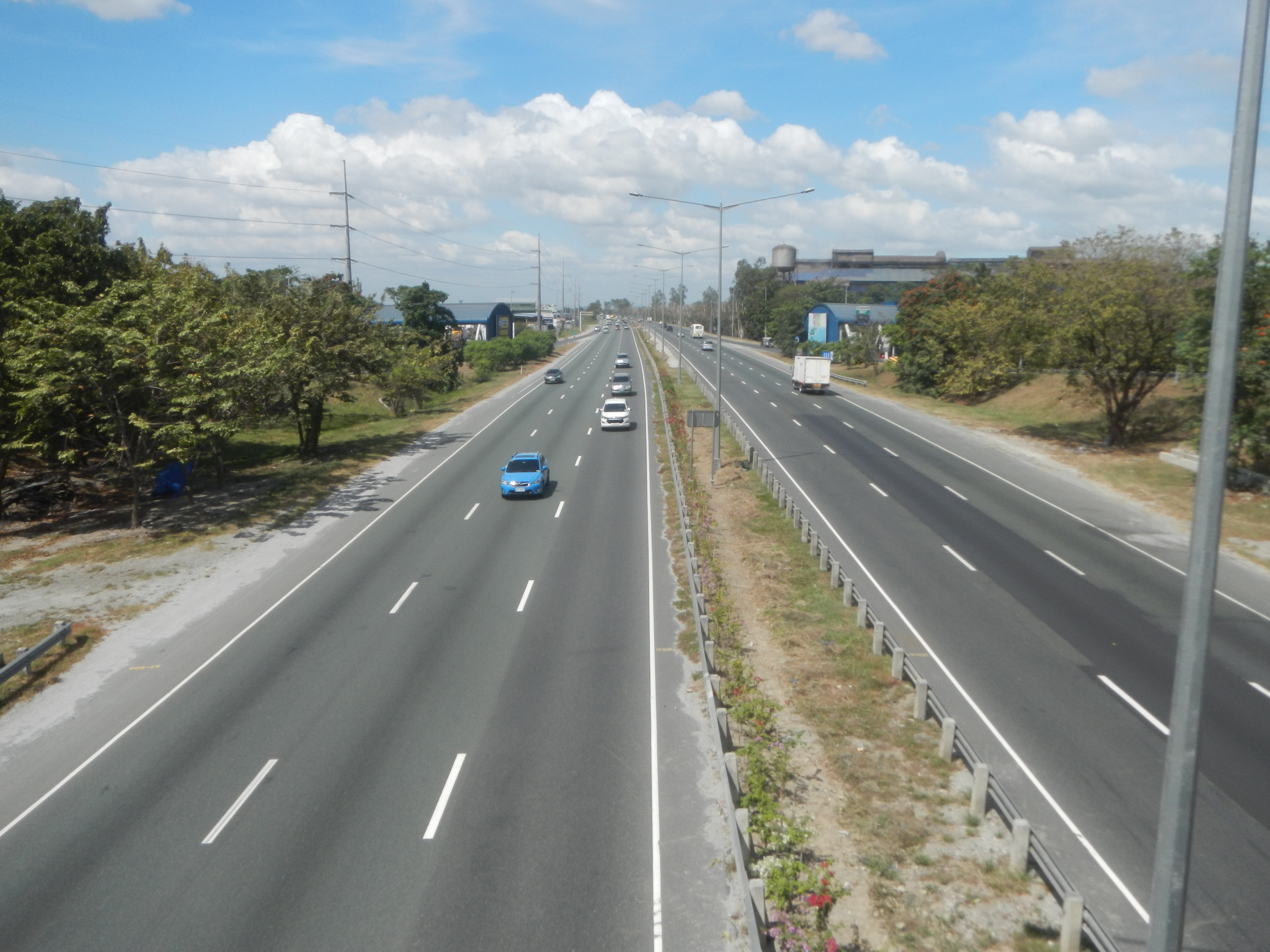
NLEX in San Simon, after the 2016 expansion project

Construction of NLEX Segment 8.1 (Mindanao Avenue Link), the first segment of the Harbor Link project, broke ground on April 2, 2009, with actual construction work beginning on April 21, 2009. Right-of-way for the road and interchange was then established throughout its construction where several houses were demolished. It was opened to the traffic on June 5, 2010. The spur road became part of the C-5 Road North Extension and is built to provide another entry point to the expressway from Metro Manila and decongest Balintawak Interchange.

On March 18, 2015, NLEX Segment 9 or the NLEX Karuhatan Link was opened, providing continuation to Segment 8.1 that runs from the other side of the Harbor Link Interchange to MacArthur Highway in Karuhatan, Valenzuela.

On February 28, 2019, the main stretch of NLEX Segment 10 or the NLEX Harbor Link, from Karuhatan to C-3 Road, was opened to traffic. On February 21, 2020, its C3–R10 Section was partially opened up to its Malabon exit ramp; the remaining section to Radial Road 10 was opened on June 15, 2020.

NLEX Segment 8.2, which would extend NLEX Segment 8.1 from Mindanao Avenue to Congressional Avenue, is also set to be constructed, but its construction was delayed due to right of way issues.

==== NLEX Connector ====
NLEX Connector is a 7.7-kilometer (4.8 mi) elevated highway serving as a connector between Harbor Link and Skyway. Section 1 was opened to the public, while Section 2, which is 59.12% complete as of December 2023, was partially opened and is planned to be finished in the fourth quarter of 2024.

=== Proposed renaming ===
The main expressway has been a subject of some legislative measures for its proposed renaming. These were filed to commemorate to the historical significance and contributions of its intended namesakes, respectively. However, none has taken effect to date, as these await a counterpart measure from the Senate before it can be signed into law by the President of the Philippines.

On May 10, 2015, the House Committee on Public Works and Highways approved House Bill No. 4820 that seeks to rename the expressway to President Corazon C. Aquino Expressway (CAEX), in honor of former President Corazon Aquino, who was regarded as an icon of democracy. It was authored by Magnolia Rosa Antonino-Nadres, the then-representative from Nueva Ecija's 4th district.

On May 13, 2019, the House of Representatives passed on third and final reading the House Bill No. 8958 that seeks to rename the expressway to the Marcelo H. del Pilar Expressway (MHDPEX), in honor of Marcelo H. del Pilar, a revolutionary writer and patriot from Bulacan. The bill is principally authored by Jose Antonio Sy-Alvarado, the then-representative from Bulacan's 1st district.

=== Flooding ===
Installation of portable flood control barriers at the expressway

Certain segments of the expressway are known to flood.

On August 2023, the San Simon segment experienced floods up to 50cm, causing standstill traffic buildup and running speeds of 5-10 kph. According to Metro Pacific Tollways president and CEO Rogelio Singson, these floods are due to the overflowing of the Pampanga River due to Typhoon Falcon. On February 2025, a 200-meter stretch of road in the area was raised by 0.7 meters and an overpass was raised by 1.5 meters.

On August 29, 2026, the San Simon segment experienced water buildup, causing up 10 km buildup on both southbound and northbound. On August 31, 2026, NLEX Corporation issued a traffic advisory stating that the portion is still not passable to Class 1 vehicles, suggesting alternative routes and opening a U-turn slot to avoid the segment. On September 1, 2026, motorists are still enduring of up to 24 hours of traffic due to the flooded segment, some with depleting food and fuel supply. On September 2, 2026, the Toll Regulatory Board has directed NLEX Corporation to explain the still-present flooding and proposed measures to avoid its recurrence, as well as to reimburse toll fees to vehicles that U-turned.

The Meycauayan segment also experienced flooding on August 29, 2026, caused by the overflow of the Meycauayan River due to the southwest monsoon, causing traffic buildup and running speeds of 1-10 kph.

== Future ==
=== NLEX Phase 3 ===
NLEX Phase 3 would be a 40-kilometer (25 mi) extension with three segments from NLEX Main, originally planned to be built from San Simon, Pampanga, to Dinalupihan, Bataan, connecting to the Subic Bay Freeport Zone via SCTEX. However, the plan was modified to instead start somewhere between Apalit and San Fernando in Pampanga, then cut across Guagua and end at Dinalupihan. Though the project will tentatively start from Apalit based on the concession, the new alignment has yet to be finalized.

=== Santo Tomas Interchange ===
On January 19, 2024, the NLEX Corporation announced its partnership with the Department of Public Works and Highways and the Toll Regulatory Board for the construction of a new interchange in Santo Tomas, Pampanga, as part of the Greater Pampanga Circumferential Road Masterplan. The interchange will connect the future Lubao–Guagua–Minalin–Santo Tomas Bypass Road and aims to alleviate congestion on Jose Abad Santos Avenue.

=== NLEX Air ===
On August 30, 2024, MPTC announced plans to construct an elevated road, named NLEX Air, extending from the Balintawak Toll Plaza to the Tambubong Interchange. With a total length of 17 kilometers (11 mi) over one of the most congested sections of the expressway, MPTC believes an elevated tollway would ease traffic buildup in the area. In November, MTC President J Luigi L Bautista announced NLEX Air will be a multi-lane free-flow (MLFF) system or barrier-free tollway, equipped with efficiency antennae, RFID sensors, ALPR and infrared, artificial intelligence, and machine learning.

=== New Manila International Airport link ===
Pillars have been built on NLEX between its Balintawak toll plaza and Skyway Stage 3's Balintawak/NLEX off-ramp to accommodate a future toll road to New Manila International Airport in Bulakan, Bulacan. The future project, to be built by San Miguel Corporation, will expand the capacity of NLEX by adding new 4–5 lanes up to Marilao, which was selected for another toll road to the future airport. After the completion of this elevated toll road, NLEX will have 11–13 lanes total (3–4 lanes per direction on NLEX + 5 lanes on the elevated segment) from Balintawak Cloverleaf to Marilao, ultimately bypassing the NLEX's open section.

The toll road project, later known as the Northern Access Link Expressway (NALEX), was approved by the Toll Regulatory Board in June 2022. It would be 19 kilometers (12 mi) long from Skyway Stage 3 to a roundabout in Meycauayan, near the airport. Another 117-kilometer (73 mi) stretch would be built beyond the NMIA roundabout, ending at the southern end of the Tarlac–Pangasinan–La Union Expressway in Tarlac City. When completed, NALEX would be 136 kilometers (85 mi) long. The NALEX project costs ₱148 billion and the first segment is targeted to be completed by 2026.

As of 2026, the expressway's first segment hasn't been completed yet.

== Tolls ==
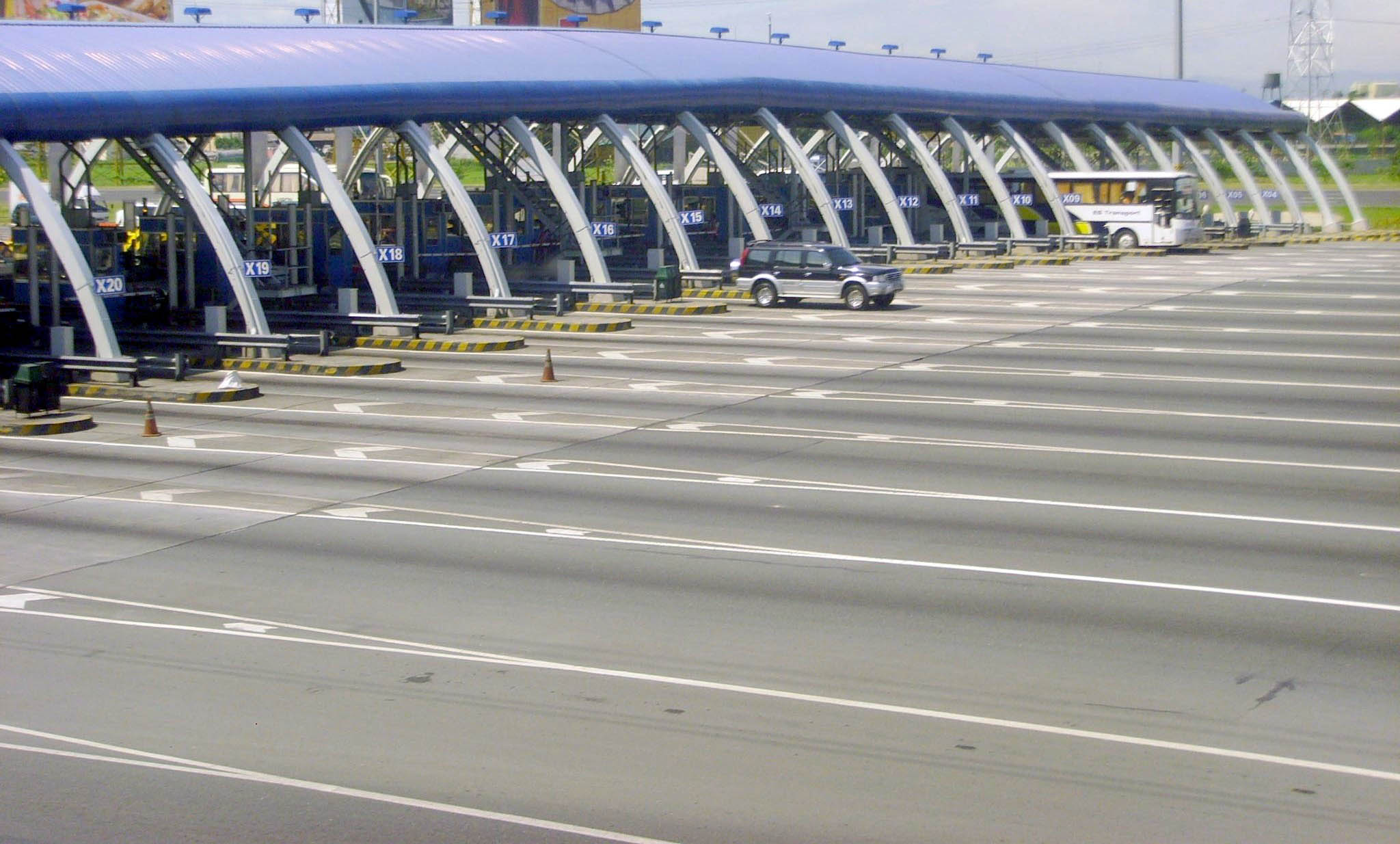
Bocaue Toll Plaza

The tollway has two sections: an open section and a closed section. The open section, which is between Bocaue Exit and Balintawak Toll Barrier and the entire NLEX Harbor Link, employs the use of a barrier toll system, which charges a flat toll based on vehicle class. It is employed to reduce the number of toll barriers (and associated bottlenecks) within Metro Manila. The closed section, which is from Bocaue Exit northwards and the northbound exit to Philippine Arena (south of Bocaue), is distance-based, charging based on the class of vehicle and distance traveled. The section south of Balintawak toll barrier is toll-free, especially to vehicles travelling between Quirino Highway and Balintawak Interchange.

When the expressway was modernized, an electronic toll collection system was set up for Class 1 vehicles while prepaid magnetic cards were assigned to Class 2 and 3 vehicles to speed up transactions at toll booths. These have since been replaced by a unified ETC system operated by Easytrip Services Corporation. In accordance with law, all toll rates include a 12% Value-Added Tax (VAT). With the movement of the northernmost toll gate to Sta. Ines, the NLEX and SCTEX toll systems have been merged into one combined system, with tolls for all enclosed destinations listed.

In 2027, the existing toll collection system will transition to a barrierless, multi-lane free flow (MLFF; open road tolling) approach, eliminating all toll barriers. Vehicles will move through smart gantries that are fitted with RFID scanners, automatic license plate recognition cameras, and sophisticated sensors that facilitate contactless, real-time toll collection — allowing drivers to maintain their speed without stopping. Once fully implemented, it will be the first expressway in the Philippines to operate without toll plazas and utilizing this method.

The toll rates, implemented since January 20, 2026, are as follows:

Class	Open system (Balintawak–Marilao)	Closed system (Bocaue–Santa Ines)
Class 1 (cars, motorcycles, SUVs, jeepneys)	₱85	₱5.46/km
Class 2 (buses, light trucks)	₱211	₱14.54/km
Class 3 (heavy trucks)	₱254	₱16.88/km

== Services ==
=== Emergency phones and parking bays ===
Emergency telephone boxes are located throughout the whole length of the expressway. Parking bays (lay-bys) are also placed on regular intervals on the expressway, for use in emergency situations.

=== Service areas ===
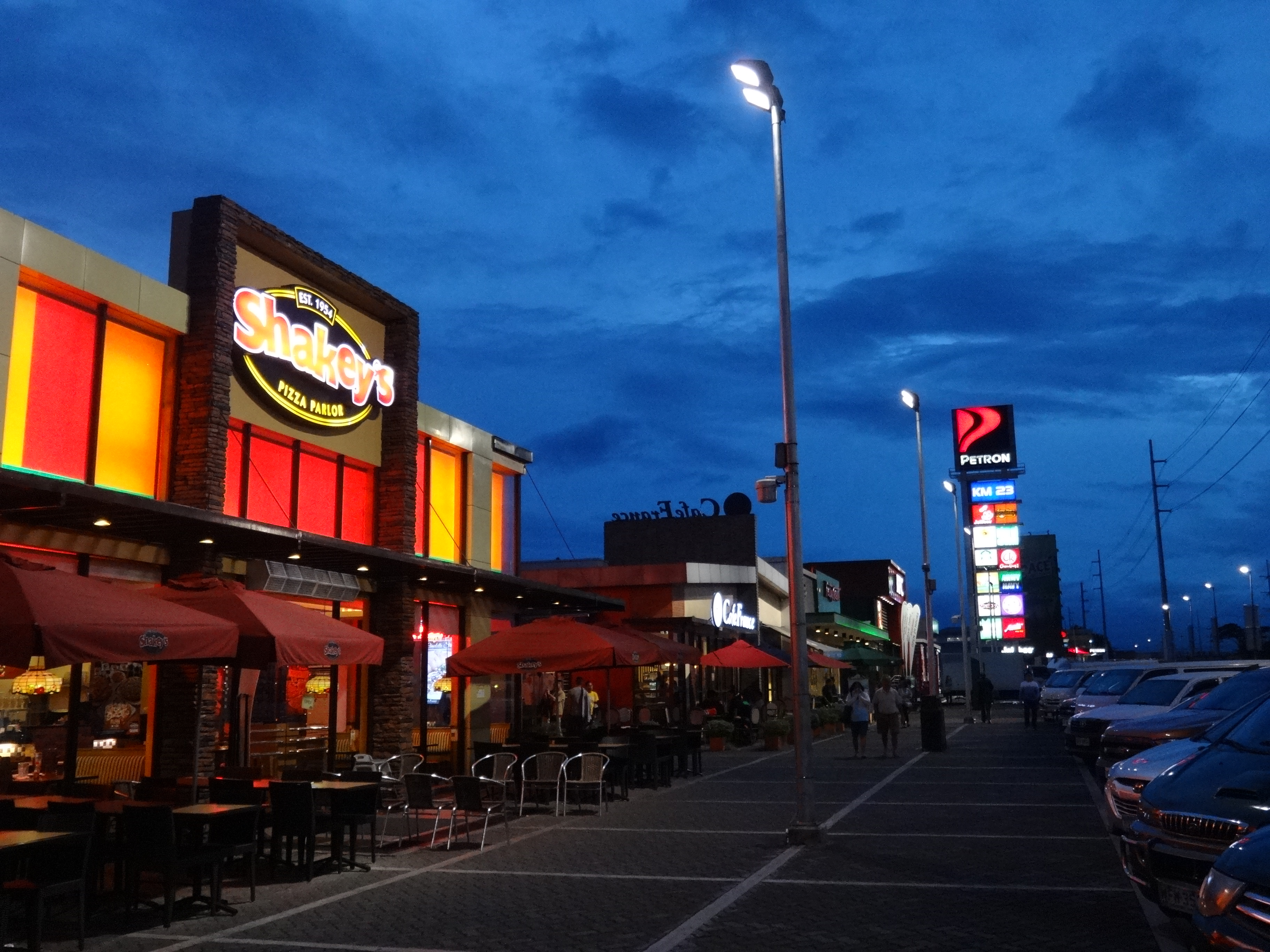
Petron Km. 23 in Marilao

North Luzon Expressway has two service areas with 5 on both northbound and southbound of the main line, mostly located on the closed toll section north of Bocaue, and one on Tabang Spur Road; one northbound service area on the main line is currently under construction. Each service station hosts a gas station, a convenience store, restrooms, car repair, and lubrication services. Most of these also have restaurants and ATMs, with some also providing ETC installation and reloading for Easytrip RFID users.

Location	Kilometer	Name	Services	Notes
Valenzuela	17	NLEX Drive&Dine	Phoenix, 7-Eleven, JT's Manukan Grille, KFC, McDonald's, Pancake House, Army Navy, Nike, Levi's, Casio Watch Outlet Store, Yellow Cab, Kenny Rogers Roasters, Empanada Nation, Banapple, Pizza Hut, Max's, Tokyo Tokyo, Subway	Southbound only. Formerly a standalone Caltex service station, which was expanded and later replaced by Phoenix Petroleum.
Marilao	22	Petron Km. 23	Petron, Jollibee, Chowking, Tapa King, SereniTea, Puma Outlet Store, Burby's, Treats, KFC, Krispy Kreme, Max's, Army Navy, Café France, Shakey's, Seafood Island, Burger King, The Coffee Bean & Tea Leaf, Pancake House, Starbucks, Kenny Rogers Roasters, Hap Chan, Mister Donut, BPI ATM, RCBC ATM, UCPB ATM	Northbound only. Expanded in 2012.
Bocaue	30	Petron Km. 31	Petron, McDonald's, Fruitas, Pancake House, Subway, Yellow Cab, Army Navy, Max's, Bibingkinitan, Chowking, KFC, Turks, Treats, Starbucks, BPI ATM, Bank of Commerce ATM	Southbound only
Balagtas	31-32	Shell NLEX Northbound	Shell, Select, Jollibee, KFC, Burger King, Kenny Rogers Roasters, Starbucks, Chowking, Cinnabon, Hen Lin, Pancake House, Bulacan Lugaw Kitchen, Mang Inasal, Krispy Kreme, Kettle Korn, Don's Original Spanish Churros, Go Mango, BPI ATM, RCBC ATM	Northbound only
Guiguinto	36	Shell Tabang NLEX	Shell, Shell Shop	Located on Tabang Spur Road. Eastbound only.
Guiguinto	36	Shell of Asia	Shell, Burger King, Adidas Outlet, Chowking, Mang Inasal, Starbucks, Puma Outlet Store, Fusion Outlet, Raptor Concept Store, Lauro's, DBP ATM, RCBC ATM, Lucky Dragon, Potato Corner	Southbound only
Plaridel	42	Petron Km. 42	Petron, Treats, McDonald's	Northbound only
Apalit	55	Total NLEX	Total, Bonjour, Mang Inasal, Burby's Grill, Max's, Pancake House, Tim Hortons, Tropical Hut, Tapa King	Northbound only
San Fernando	62	Mega Station	7-Eleven (formerly Star Mart), Aramco (under construction), Army Navy, KFC, Chowking, Jollibee, Tokyo Tokyo, Nike Factory Store, Teresa's, Kenny Rogers Roasters, Razon's of Guagua, Fashion Rack Designer Outlets, Raptor Concept Store, Café France, BPI ATM, RCBC ATM	Southbound only. Formerly Caltex Mega Station.
Mexico	71	Petron Km. 71 Lakeshore	Petron, Treats, McDonald's, Starbucks Coffee, Tapa King, Tokyo Tokyo, Kenny Roger's Roasters, BPI ATM, Bank of Commerce ATM	Northbound only
Mexico	76	Shell NLEX Southbound	Shell, Jollibee, Wendy's, Max's, Krispy Kreme, Tapa King, Hap Chan, Chowking, Select, Yellow Cab, Chatime, Pancake House, Fashion Rack Designer Outlets, BPI ATM, RCBC ATM	Southbound only
Mexico	77	Shell Mobility Mexico Haven	Shell, Jollibee, Kenny Roger's Roasters, Pepper Lunch, Starbucks Coffee, Seattle's Best Coffee	Northbound only.

== Exits ==
Exit numbers are based on kilometer post. Exits begin at 9 because the NLEX is a logical continuation of A. Bonifacio Avenue. Rizal Park in Manila is designated as Kilometer Zero.

Region	Province	City/Municipality	km	mi	Exit	Name	Destinations	Notes
Metro Manila	Quezon City		9.56	5.94		Balintawak Cloverleaf	AH26 (EDSA) – Cubao, Monumento	Southern end of AH26 concurrency and southern terminus; continues south to Manila as N160 (A. Bonifacio Avenue)
Metro Manila	Quezon City		10.01– 10.1	6.22– 6.3			N127 (Quirino Highway) – Novaliches	Half-Y interchange; northbound exit and southbound entrance; consists of the Old and New Novaliches Flyovers
Metro Manila	Caloocan–Malabon boundary		11	6.8	North end of N160 concurrency			
Metro Manila	Caloocan–Malabon boundary		11	6.8	Manila North Expressway: Balintawak toll plaza (1968–2005, demolished)			
Metro Manila	Caloocan		11	6.8			E2 (Metro Manila Skyway) – Makati, Alabang	Balintawak/NLEX Exit of Skyway; northbound entrance and southbound exit
Metro Manila	Caloocan		11	6.8		Libis Baesa	Libis Baesa, Potrero	Southbound exit only
Metro Manila	Caloocan		12	7.5	Balintawak Toll Plaza (northbound only)			
Metro Manila	Caloocan		12	7.5	Balintawak Toll Plaza expansion (northbound only; exclusively for Class 1 vehicles)			
Metro Manila	Valenzuela		13.557	8.424	13	Harbor Link Interchange	E5 (NLEX Harbor Link) – Mindanao Avenue, Port of Manila, Santa Mesa	Cloverleaf interchange
Metro Manila	Valenzuela		14	8.7		Mapulang Lupa	Mapulang Lupa, Paso de Blas, Parada	Northbound exit only; demolished
Metro Manila	Valenzuela		15.392	9.564	15	Paso de Blas (Valenzuela City)	N118 (Paso de Blas Road) – Paso de Blas, Novaliches, Fairview, VGC	Diamond interchange
Metro Manila	Valenzuela		17	11	NLEX Drive&Dine (southbound)			
Metro Manila	Valenzuela		17	11	17	Lawang Bato	Lawang Bato, Punturin	Northbound entrance and exit only; entrance exclusively for Class 1 and 2 RFID users only
Metro Manila	Valenzuela		17	11	17	Lingunan	Lingunan, Canumay, Lawang Bato	Southbound exit and southbound entrance only
Central Luzon	Bulacan	Meycauayan	19	12	19	Libtong	Libtong	Northbound exit only
Central Luzon	Bulacan	Meycauayan	20.128	12.507	20	Meycauayan	N117 (Malhacan Road) / Iba Road – Meycauayan, Obando	Folded diamond interchange
Central Luzon	Bulacan	Meycauayan	21	13	21	Pandayan	Pandayan	Southbound exit only (class 1 only)
Central Luzon	Bulacan	Meycauayan	22	14	22	F. Raymundo	F. Raymundo	Northbound exit only (class 1 only)
Central Luzon	Bulacan	Marilao	22	14	Petron KM 23 service area (northbound only)			
Central Luzon	Bulacan	Marilao	23	14	23	Marilao	Marilao	Northbound exit only; replaced by a new exit with the same name a few meters north
Central Luzon	Bulacan	Marilao	23.317	14.489	23	Marilao	M. Villarica Road / Patubig Road – Marilao, San Jose del Monte, Norzagaray	Folded diamond interchange
Central Luzon	Bulacan	Marilao	24	15		MALEX		Trumpet interchange; link to the proposed New Manila International Airport
Central Luzon	Bulacan	Bocaue	26	16	26	Ciudad de Victoria		Northbound exit only; replaced by a proper northbound-southbound exit
Central Luzon	Bulacan	Bocaue	26	16		Philippine Arena	Ciudad de Victoria, Philippine Arena, Santa Maria	Half diamond and partial cloverleaf interchange
Central Luzon	Bulacan	Bocaue				Bocaue Bypass		Southbound entry only; under construction
Central Luzon	Bulacan	Bocaue	27	17	Bocaue Toll Plaza (southbound only); North end of barrier toll system. South end of closed road toll system.			
Central Luzon	Bulacan	Bocaue	27	17	Bocaue Toll Plaza expansion (southbound only); North end of barrier toll system. South end of closed road toll system.			
Central Luzon	Bulacan	Bocaue	27.746	17.241	27	Bocaue	Fortunato Halili Avenue – Bocaue, Santa Maria	Diamond interchange
Central Luzon	Bulacan	Bocaue	28.65	17.80	28	Tambubong	Taal, Tambubong (Bocaue), Santa Maria	Northbound entrance, northbound exit, and southbound entrance only
Central Luzon	Bulacan	Bocaue	30.3	18.8	Petron KM 31 service area (southbound only)			
Central Luzon	Bulacan	Balagtas	32	20	Shell (NLEX Northbound) service area			
Central Luzon	Bulacan	Balagtas	31.9– 32.1	19.8– 19.9		Burol	Burol, Guiguinto	Northbound exit only; sections of the former exit are now used as residential road and exit point from Shell service area.
Central Luzon	Bulacan	Balagtas	32.885	20.434	32	Tabang (Guiguinto)	E1 (Tabang Spur Road) – Tabang, Guiguinto, Malolos	Half-Y interchange; northbound exit and southbound entrance; former northern terminus (1968–1977)
Central Luzon	Bulacan	Balagtas	33.36	20.73	34	Balagtas	N247 (Plaridel Bypass Road) – Balagtas, Bustos, Pandi, Angat, Doña Remedios Trinidad, San Rafael	Partial trumpet interchange; northbound exit, northbound entrance and southbound entrance
Central Luzon	Bulacan	Guiguinto	36	22		NLEX-NLEE Interchange		Links to the proposed provincial spur road of North Luzon East Expressway; interchange type not yet known
Central Luzon	Bulacan	Guiguinto	37	23	Shell of Asia service area (southbound only)			
Central Luzon	Bulacan	Guiguinto	38.51	23.93	38	Santa Rita (Guiguinto)	AH26 (Maharlika Highway / Cagayan Valley Road) – Guiguinto, Plaridel, Baliwag, Cabanatuan, Bustos, Pulilan	Folded diamond interchange; north end of AH26 concurrency
Central Luzon	Bulacan	Malolos			No major junctions			
Central Luzon	Bulacan	Plaridel	42	26	Petron KM 42 service area (northbound only)			
Central Luzon	Bulacan	Plaridel – Pulilan boundary			Angat Bridge over the Angat River			
Central Luzon	Bulacan	Pulilan	45	28	45	Pulilan	N115 (Pulilan Regional Road) – Pulilan, Baliwag, Malolos, Calumpit, Apalit, San Simon	Diamond interchange
Central Luzon	Bulacan	Pulilan	46	29	South end of Candaba Viaduct			
Central Luzon	Bulacan	Calumpit			No major junctions			
Central Luzon	Pampanga	Apalit	52	32	North end of Candaba Viaduct			
Central Luzon	Pampanga	Apalit	55	34	Total (NLEX) service area (northbound only)			
Central Luzon	Pampanga	San Simon	56.965	35.396	56	San Simon	Quezon Road – San Simon, Apalit, Minalin, Santo Tomas	Diamond interchange
Central Luzon	Pampanga	Santo Tomas	60	37		Santo Tomas	Lubao–Guagua–Minalin–Santo Tomas Bypass Road	
Central Luzon	Pampanga	San Fernando	62	39	Mega Station (southbound only)			
Central Luzon	Pampanga	San Fernando	65.825	40.902	65	San Fernando	N3 (Jose Abad Santos Avenue) – San Fernando, Bacolor, Guagua, Mexico, Subic Freeport Zone, Bataan	Half partial cloverleaf (east half), and half diamond interchange (west half)
Central Luzon	Pampanga	Mexico	71	44	Petron KM 71 Lakeshore (northbound only)			
Central Luzon	Pampanga	Mexico	72.89	45.29	72	Mexico (closed)	Mexico, Lakeshore Estate	Half partial cloverleaf interchange (demolished); replaced by the current exit few meters north
Central Luzon	Pampanga	Mexico	72	45	72	Mexico	Mexico-Calulut Road – Mexico, Dalisdis (Mexico), Panipuan (San Fernando)	Trumpet interchange
Central Luzon	Pampanga	Mexico	76	47	Shell service station (southbound only)			
Central Luzon	Pampanga	Mexico	77	48	Shell Mexico Mobility Haven service station (northbound only)			
Central Luzon	Pampanga	Angeles			Abacan Bridge over the Abacan River			
Central Luzon	Pampanga	Angeles	81.0	50.3	81	Angeles	Angeles–Magalang Road – Angeles, Magalang	Partial cloverleaf interchange (1984–2005); replaced by the current exit few meters north
Central Luzon	Pampanga	Angeles	81.342	50.544	81	Angeles	Angeles–Magalang Road/Pandan Road/Aniceto Gueco Street – Angeles, Magalang, Clark	Trumpet interchange
Central Luzon	Pampanga	Mabalacat	82	51	Dau Toll Plaza (2005–2016)			
Central Luzon	Pampanga	Mabalacat	83.352	51.793	83	Dau	N215 (Dau Access Road) – Dau, Mabalacat	Trumpet interchange; former northern terminus (1977–1989)
Central Luzon	Pampanga	Mabalacat	85.56	53.16	85	SCTEX	E1 (Clark Spur Road) – Clark Airport, Tarlac City, Baguio, Subic	Half trumpet interchange; north end of R-8 concurrency; northbound exit and southbound entrance
Central Luzon	Pampanga	Mabalacat	87	54	Sta. Ines Toll Plaza (1989–2005, 2016–present)			
Central Luzon	Pampanga	Mabalacat	88.70	55.12	88	Santa Ines	N213 (Mabalacat–Magalang Road) / (Mabalacat Bypass Road) – Clark Airport, Concepcion, Mabalacat	Northern terminus; trumpet interchange; continues north as Mabalacat Bypass Road
1.000 mi = 1.609 km; 1.000 km = 0.621 mi: Closed/former; Concurrency terminus; Incomplete access; Tolled; Unopened

=== Tabang Spur Road ===
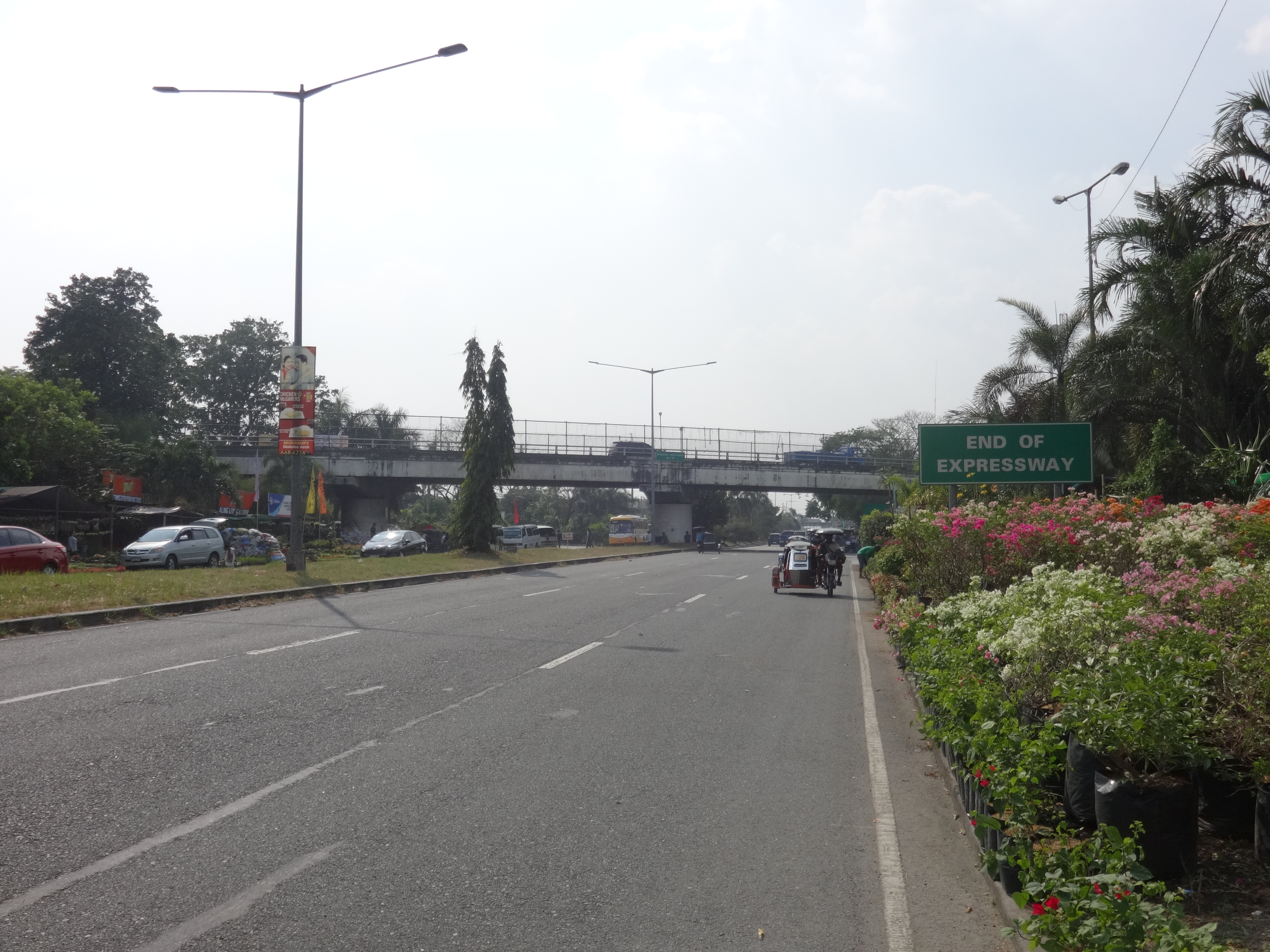
The west end of Tabang Spur Road at Guiguinto Exit

The entire route is located in Bulacan.

City/Municipality	km	mi	Exit	Name	Destinations	Notes
Guiguinto	36	22	36	Guiguinto	N1 (MacArthur Highway / Cagayan Valley Road) – Guiguinto, Malolos, Balagtas	Folded diamond interchange; western terminus; continues west as N2 (MacArthur Highway)
Guiguinto	36	22			St. Francis Street	T-intersection
Guiguinto	36	22	Shell service station (eastbound only)			
Guiguinto	36	22	Tabang Toll Plaza			
Guiguinto	34	21		Tabe	Tabe	Access for westbound motorists only
Balagtas	32	20	32		AH26 (NLEX Main) – Manila	Half-Y interchange; Eastbound exit and westbound entrance; eastern terminus
1.000 mi = 1.609 km; 1.000 km = 0.621 mi: Closed/former; Incomplete access; Tolled

== In popular culture ==
- The expressway was featured in the music video to the song "Toll Gate" by the band Hale.
- It was also featured in the film Sa North Diversion Road in 2005, based on Tony Perez's stage play of the same name. It was created by Dennis Marasigan.
- From June 6–17, 2007, On North Diversion Road, the play written by Tony Perez, was performed at The Arts House, Singapore, by young & W!LD, an actor training division of Singapore's W!LD RICE Theatre.
- Some of the stunt scenes of the 2009 Japanese film Wangan Midnight: The Movie were shot here.
- This expressway was also featured in the 1996 film Istokwa (starring Mark Anthony Fernandez and Spencer Reyes), aside from South Luzon Expressway
