= Upper Agno River Basin Resource Reserve =

Protected area in Luzon, Philippines

- IUCN category VI (protected area with sustainable use of natural resources)
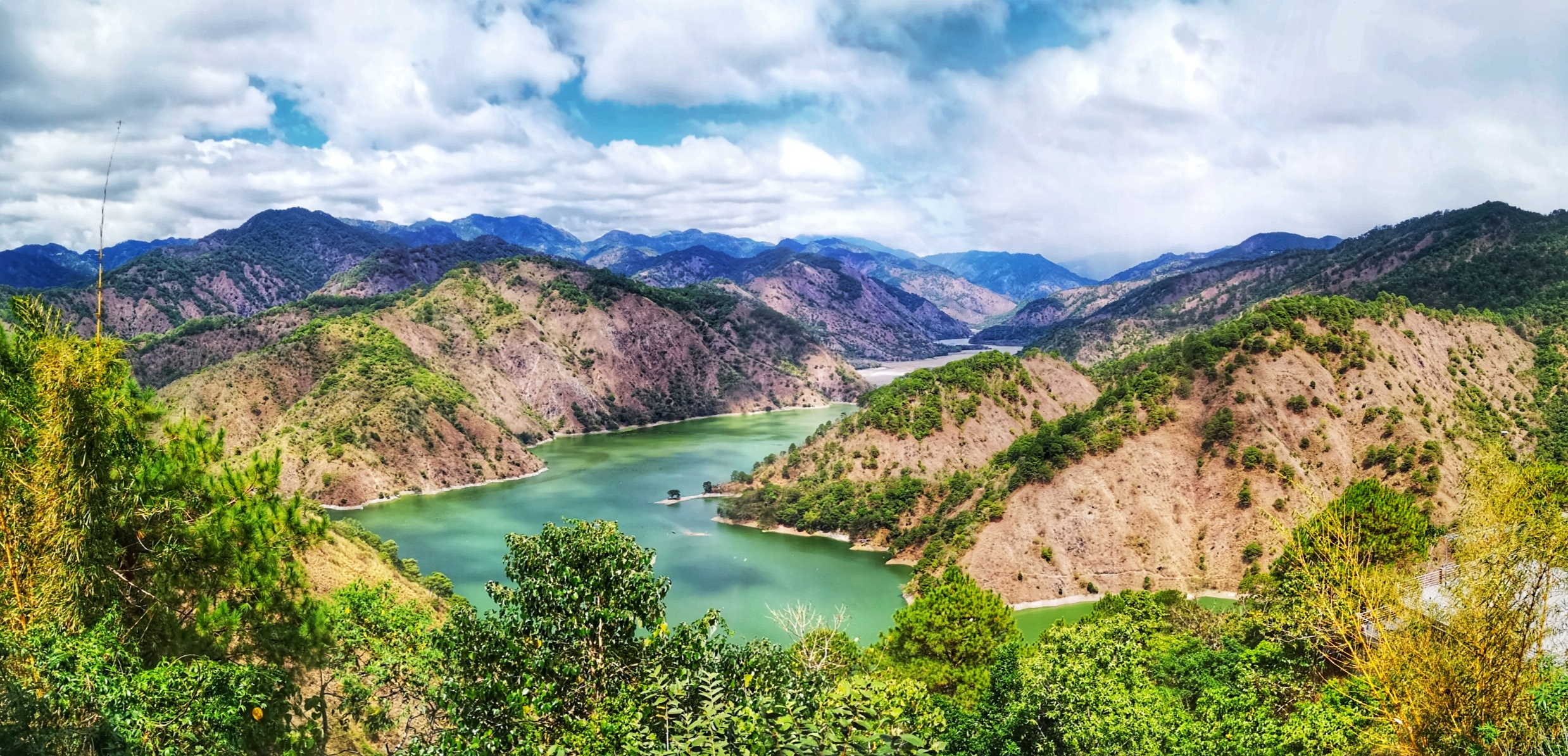
- View of the reserve surrounding the Ambuklao Dam and reservoir in Bokod

- Location within Luzon Location within Philippines
- Location: Benguet, Philippines
- Nearest city: Baguio
- Coordinates: 16°27′29″N 120°44′28″E
- Area: 77,561 hectares (191,660 acres)
- Established: November 25, 1966 (forest reserve); April 23, 2000 (resource reserve)
- Governing body: Department of Environment and Natural Resources; National Power Corporation; SN Aboitiz

The Upper Agno River Basin Resource Reserve is a protected area located on the southeast flank of the Cordillera Central in the Philippine province of Benguet along its border with Ifugao and Nueva Vizcaya. It is a resource reserve located high in the Central and Polis ranges protecting the headwaters of the Agno River. According to section 4 of the National Integrated Protected Areas System Act (R.A. 7586), a resource reserve is an extensive and relatively isolated area designated as such to preserve the natural resources of the area. The reserve comprises 77,561 hectares (191,660 acres) of the catchment area that feeds the Ambuklao and Binga dams, two of the country's oldest hydroelectric plants that supply power to the city of Baguio and entire Benguet province. Upper Agno is north of and contiguous with the Lower Agno Watershed Forest Reserve that preserves the immediate downstream of the Binga Dam where the Agno River is impounded by a third dam, the San Roque Dam, the largest in the Philippines and the main source of water, electric energy and irrigation for surrounding regions in Luzon.

== History ==
The area of the Upper Agno river basin first achieved official park protection on February 16, 1929, when Governor-General Henry L. Stimson signed Proclamation No. 217 declaring 81.8% of the entire Cordillera Central range as the Central Cordillera Forest Reserve. Through an amendment to the law made in 1932 by Governor-General Theodore Roosevelt Jr., the reserve lost 1,026.8931 hectares (2,537.508 acres) of fragmented lands to mining concessions. When President Manuel L. Quezon signed Proclamation No. 65 in 1936, a portion of the basin surrounding Mount Data was re-gazetted as part of the 2,398-hectare (5,930-acre) Baguio–Bontoc Scenic National Park. The national park was expanded to 5,512 hectares (13,620 acres) and was renamed Mount Data National Park in 1940.

In 1946, the Agno River Development Program was launched to construct six hydropower facilities along the Agno River. The Ambuklao Dam was built in 1956 while the second facility, the Binga Dam, was completed in 1960. On November 25, 1966, President Ferdinand Marcos issued Proclamation No. 120 declaring the immediate upstream and downstream of the Ambuklao Dam including a portion of the Mount Data National Park traversed by the Agno River as part of a new protected area, the 9,700-hectare (24,000-acre) Ambuklao Watershed Forest Reserve. In 1987, a portion of the forest reserve containing Luzon's highest peak, Mount Pulag, Mount Tabeyoc, Mount Panotoan and four other adjacent peaks were set aside as the Mount Pulag National Park.

On April 23, 2000, through the issuance of Proclamation No. 268, the reserve was consolidated as a resource reserve and was significantly expanded to 77,561 hectares (191,660 acres) to cover the entire upper Agno river basin bordering the Mount Data and Mount Pulag national parks.

== Geography ==
The Upper Agno reserve protects the northernmost 45.94 km (28.55 mi) section of the Agno River from the Mount Data National Park in Buguias to Binga Dam in Itogon. It is located to the east and north of the city of Baguio in the southern Cordillera Central mountains and covers the catchment area between the ridges of the Central and Polis ranges. The majority of the reserve is in Benguet shared by the municipalities of Atok, Bokod, Buguias, Itogon, Kabayan, Kibungan, La Trinidad and Tublay. It also has a sizeable area in Ifugao split between the towns of Hungduan and Kiangan and a small part in Nueva Vizcaya in the town of Kayapa.

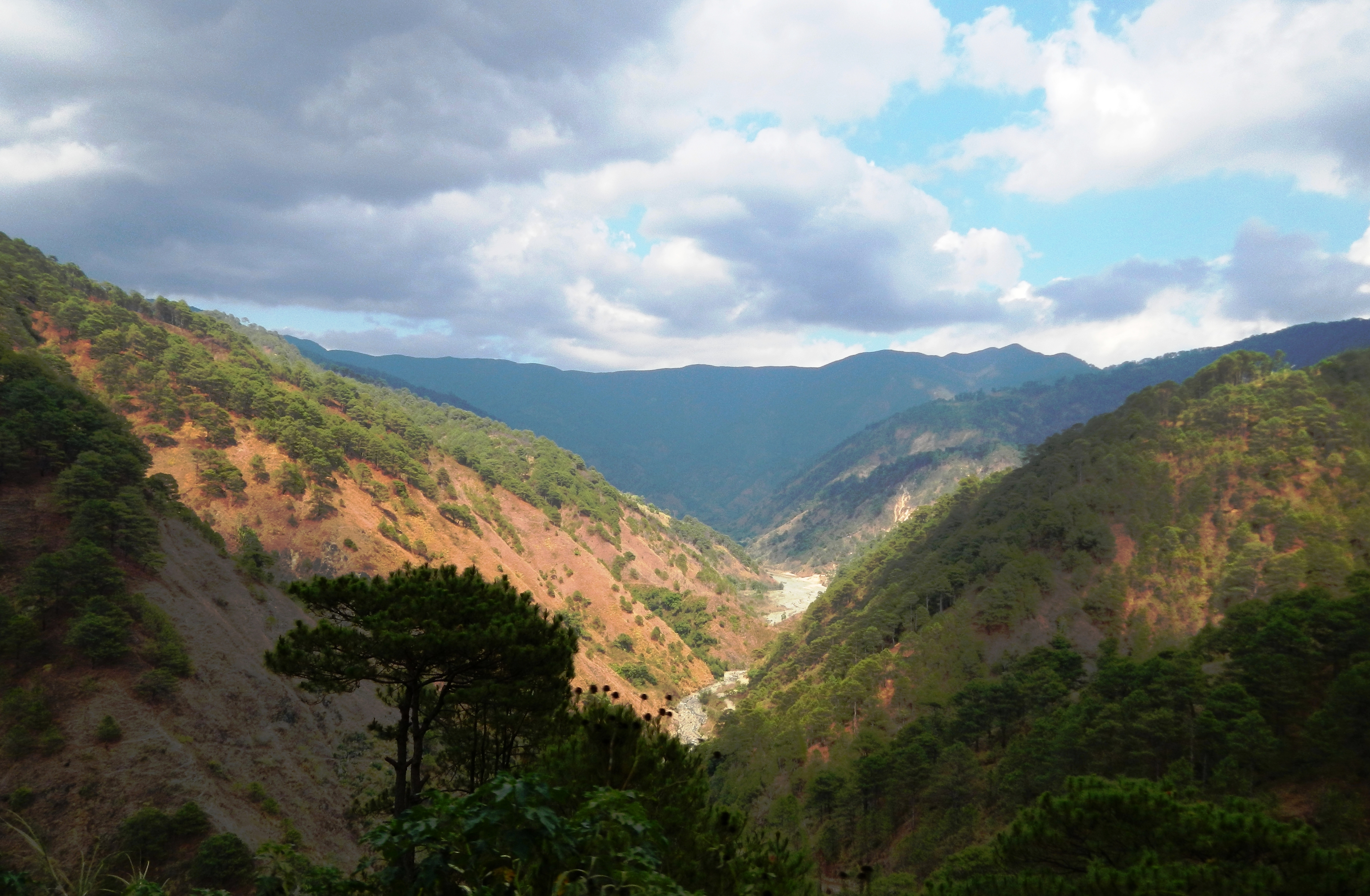
Bokod River in Karao, a tributary of the Upper Agno River

The Upper Agno River Basin is the third largest sub-catchment in the entire Agno River Basin that spans three regions in northern Luzon. Its main tributaries are the 110 km (68 mi) long Bokod River which empties into it at the Ambuklao reservoir from the east, the Benneng River which flows 121 km (75 mi) on the east side between the Ambuklao and Binga dams, and the 47 km (29 mi) long Bantay River located upstream of Ambuklao Dam. The reserve is also fed by several other smaller streams including Karao River in Bokod, and Eddet and Adaoay rivers in Kabayan.

Upper Agno is one of the highest protected areas in the country. It has an average elevation of 1,604.97 metres (5,265.6 ft), the highest among the nineteen Agno river sub-basins. Mount Mongawto (Mongoto) is the highest point in the reserve at 2,720 m (8,920 ft) situated in the Central range within the municipality of Atok. Halsema Highway (Baguio–Bontoc Road), the country's highest paved national road, runs through the reserve's western boundaries. Nine other mountain peaks over 7,000 feet (2,100 m) high provide scenic vistas, including Mount Nangaoto (8,386 ft (2,556 m), Mount Singakalsa (8,104 ft (2,470 m), Mount Aki (7,723 ft (2,354 m), Mount Ambubungan (7,405 ft (2,257 m), Mount Palugloko (7,359 ft (2,243 m), Mount Toyangan (7,238 ft (2,206 m), Mount Bayoyo (7,185 ft (2,190 m) and Mount Palansa (7,119 ft (2,170 m). This area experiences regular hailstorms and some of the coolest weather in the Philippines.

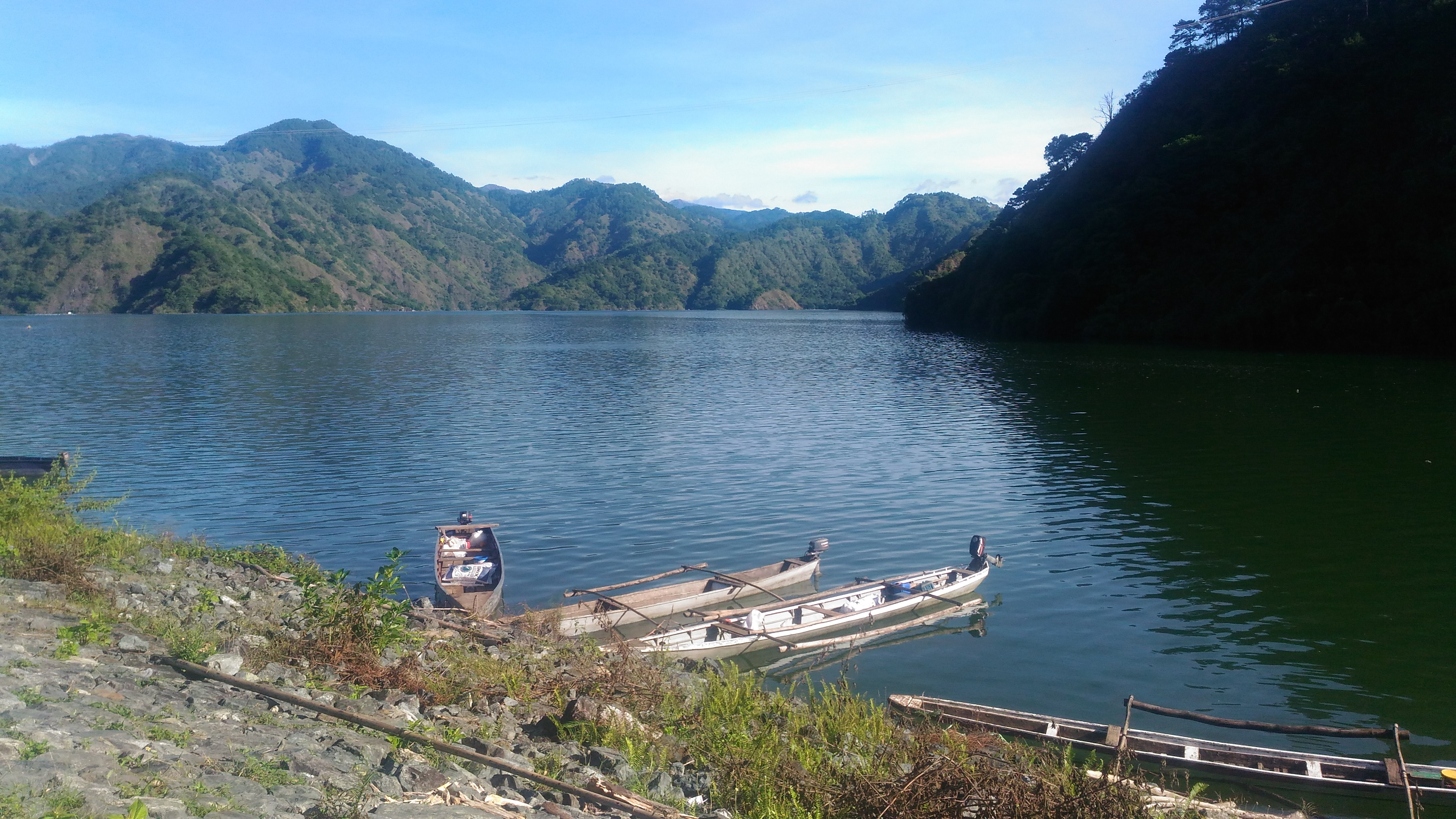
Ambuklao Lake

The focal point of the reserve is the Ambuklao Dam and reservoir situated on the confluence of the Agno and Bokod rivers in the southern portion of the reserve. It is the oldest hydropower dam in the country built in 1956 with a reservoir capacity of 329,000,000 cubic metres (1.16×10^{10} cu ft) that supplied 75 megawatts (increased to 105 MW when it was rehabilitated in 2011) to the Luzon grid. Located 19 km (12 mi) downstream of Ambuklao at the southern edge of the reserve is the Binga Dam and reservoir built in 1960 that has a capacity of 87,000,000 cubic metres (3.1×10^{9} cu ft) and maximum output of 100 megawatts.

== Ecology ==
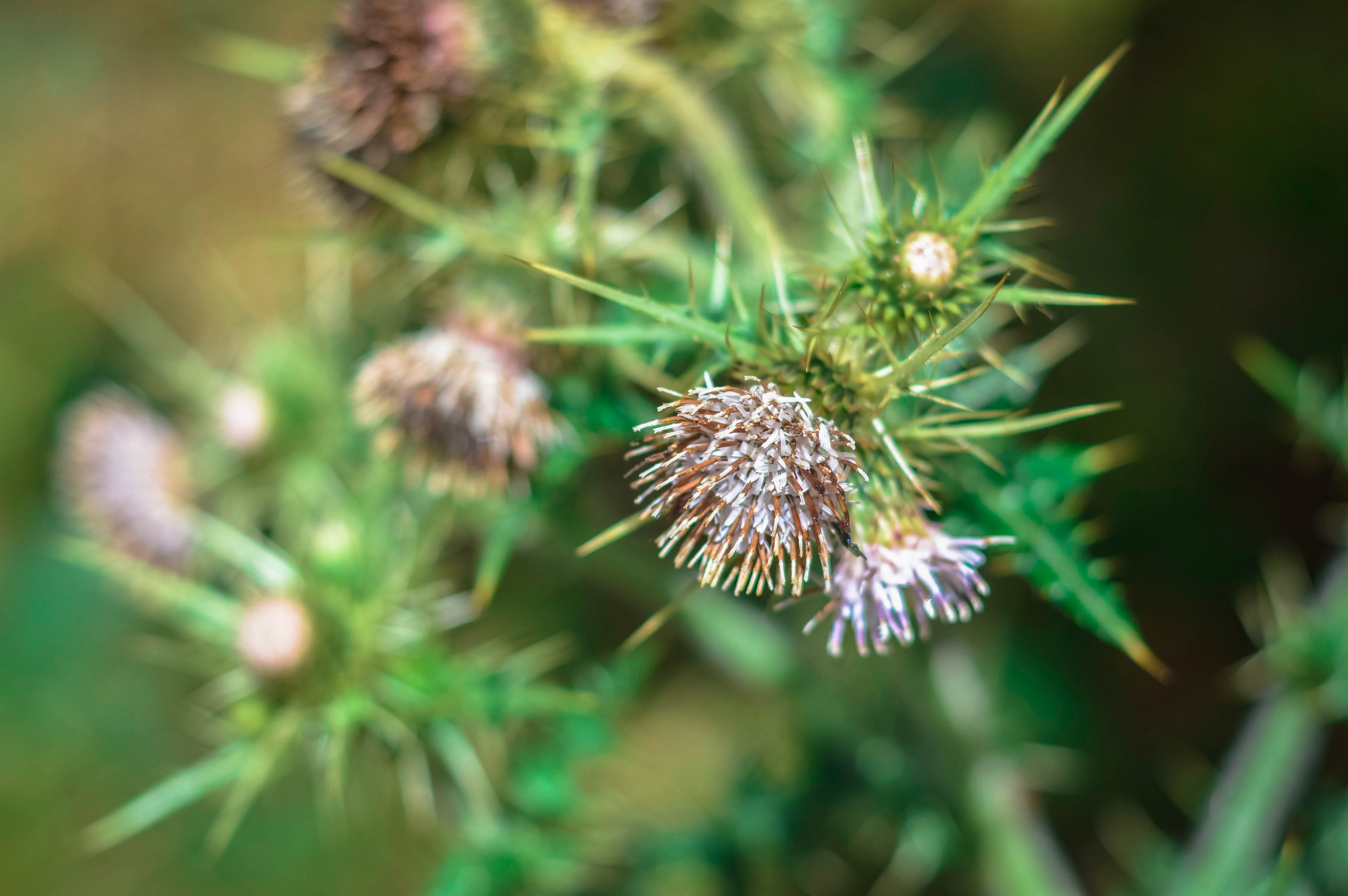
Philippine thistle (Cirsium luzoniense), an endemic ornamental plant found in the mossy forests of Bokod

The ecology of the Upper Agno reserve varies from lower montane forests, upper montane forests to grassland summits. The most dominant vegetation in the lower montane forests are the Benguet pine (Pinus kesiya), evergreen shrubs (Gaultheria borneensis) and makole flowering plants (Coprosma granadensis). In slopes above 2,000 m (6,600 ft), the mossy forests primarily contain woody plants belonging to the Ericaceae family such as Rhododendron taxifolium, Rhododendron subsessile, Vaccinium myrtoides and Vaccinium indutum. Above the upper montane forests that cover the summits of the highest peaks are grasslands dominated by dwarf bamboo (Yushania niitikayamensis) as well as heathgrass (Danthonia oreoboloides), reedgrass (Deyeuxia suizanensis), Pulag St. Johnswort (Hypericum pulogense) and (Trichophorum subcapitatum). An endemic ornamental begonia, Begonia merrittii, is also known to occur in high elevation habitats of Upper Agno. A new species of endemic orchids, Dendrochilum ignisiflorum, has also been documented in the mossy forest around the summit of the 2,300-metre (7,500 ft) high Mount Komkompol in Bokod in 2020.

At least 70 bird species have been sighted or recorded within the protected area, 46 of which are endemic to the Philippines, including the scale-feathered malkoha, mountain shrike, indigo-banded kingfisher, bicolored flowerpecker, balicassiao, flame-breasted fruit dove, Philippine coucal, Philippine scops owl, white-browed jungle flycatcher, blue-headed fantail, lovely sunbird, Luzon striped babbler, Northern Luzon dark-throated oriole and whiskered pitta. Its mammalian wildlife species include the Asian palm civet, Malayan civet, Philippine long-tailed macaque, Northern Luzon giant cloud rat, Mount Data shrew-rat, Luzon shrew, large flying fox, Philippine warty pig and Philippine deer.

The Upper Agno river and its tributaries have the highest fish diversity among the five river systems in Benguet. Fish species found in these rivers include Java fat-nose goby, mangrove flathead goby, giant mottled eel, pond loach and mosquitofish. The Ambuklao reservoir is stocked abundantly with introduced fish species, namely silver perch, Celebes goby, common carp, silver carp, bighead carp and tilapia. It also has commercially abundant freshwater shrimp and Asiatic clam. The Ambuklao reservoir also supports aquaculture and has at least 83 fish cage operators harvesting crimson snapper, tilapia and silver carp within the permitted 6.8-hectare (17-acre) fishing zone of the more than 400 ha (990-acre) artificial lake since 1994.

== Recreation ==
Nestled between Mount Pulag and Mount Ugo just east of the Ambuklao lake in Bokod is an ecologically significant hiking mountain circuit destination with peaks rising above 2,000 m (6,600 ft). The Mount Purgatory (Mangisi) Ecotourism Circuit is made up of seven mountain peaks, the highest of which are Mount Komkompol and Mount Pack, which are accessible by a 10.5 km (6.5 mi) and 15.5 km (9.6 mi) designated foot trails through long stretches of dense mossy forests, pine trees and grasslands.

== Gallery ==
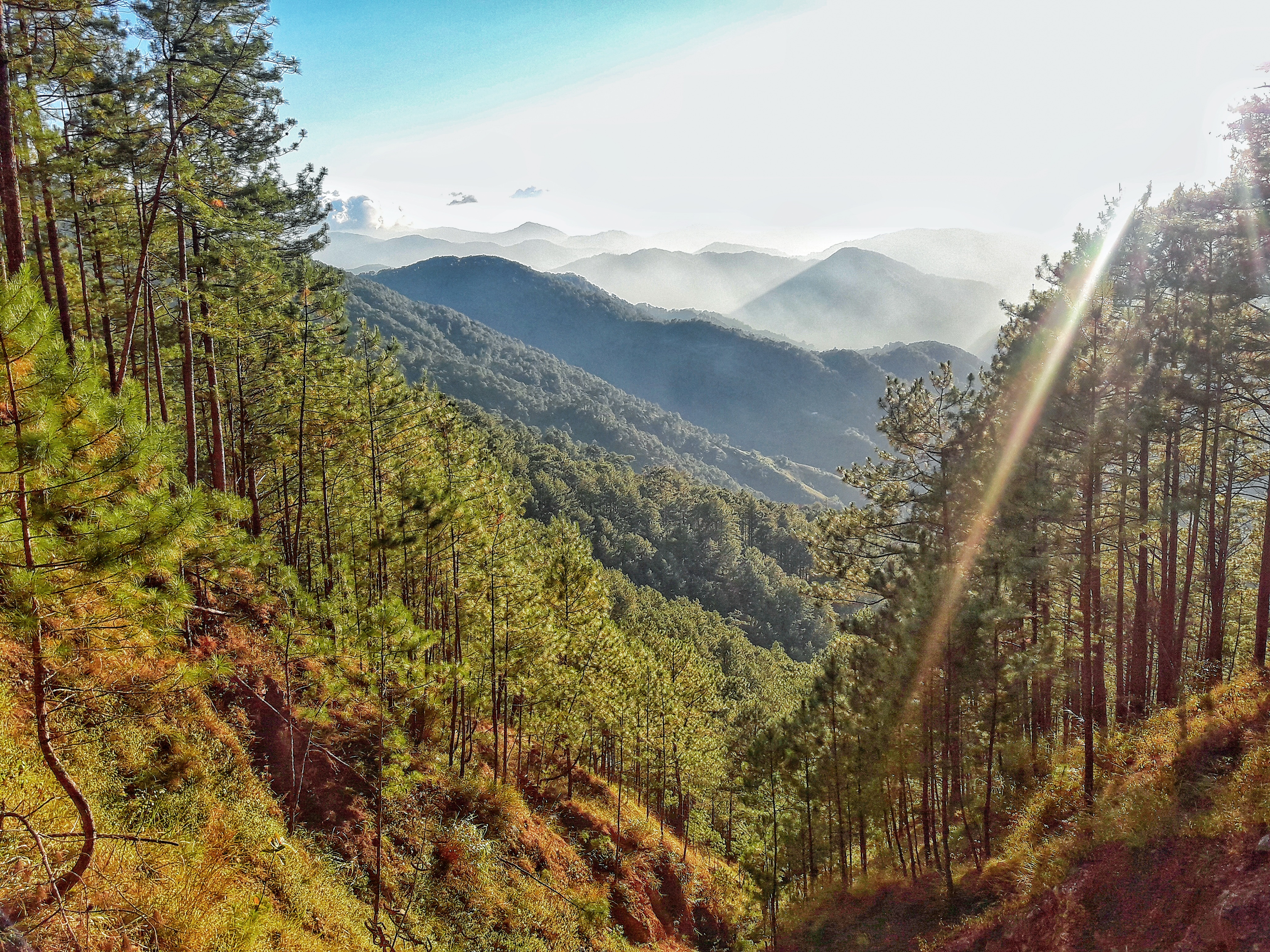
View of the pine-forested mountain landscape from Mount Purgatory/Mangisi

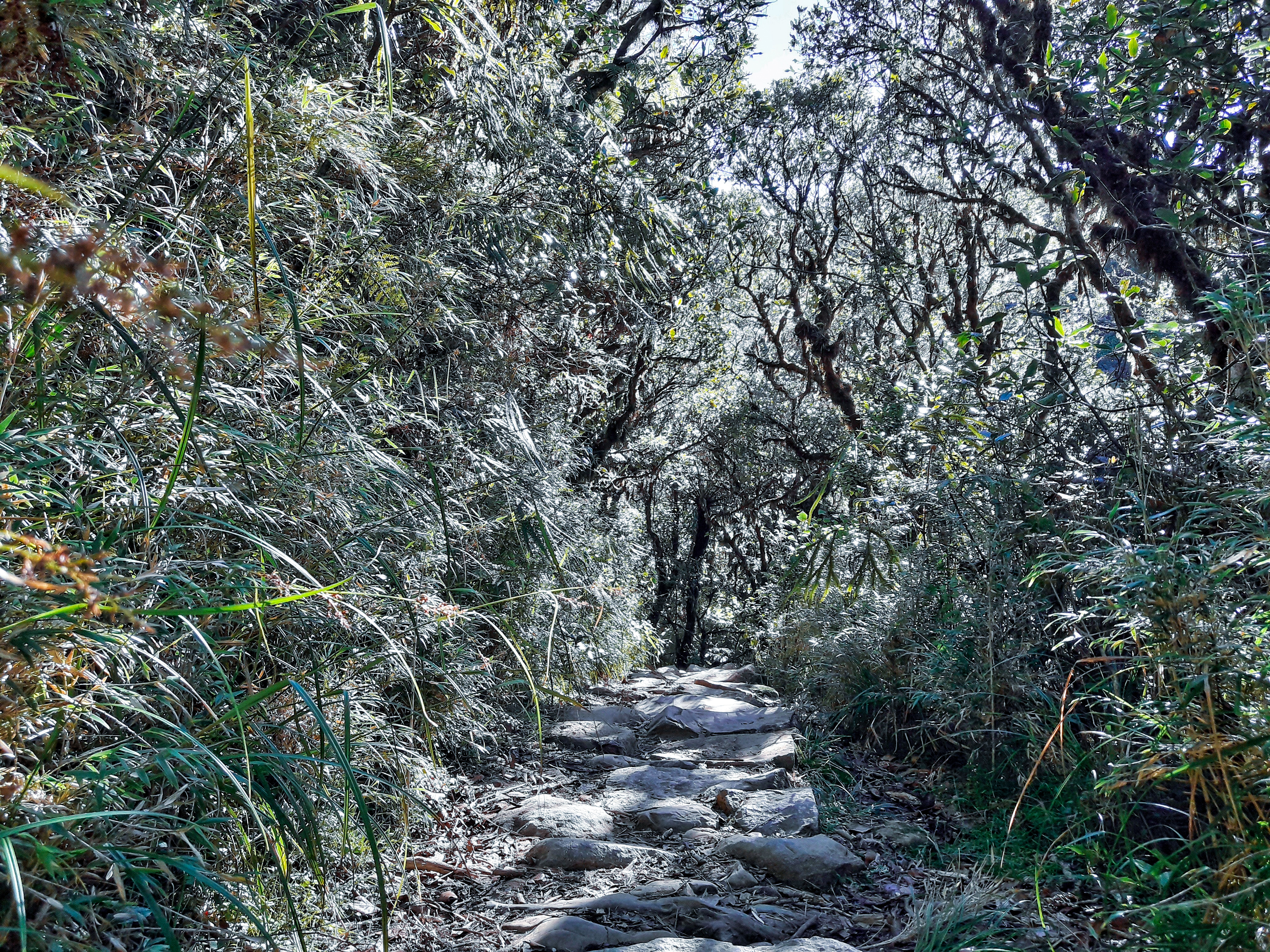
A trail inside the Purgatory/Mangisi traverse
