= Agno River =

River in Luzon, Philippines

Agno River Rio Grande de Pangasinan
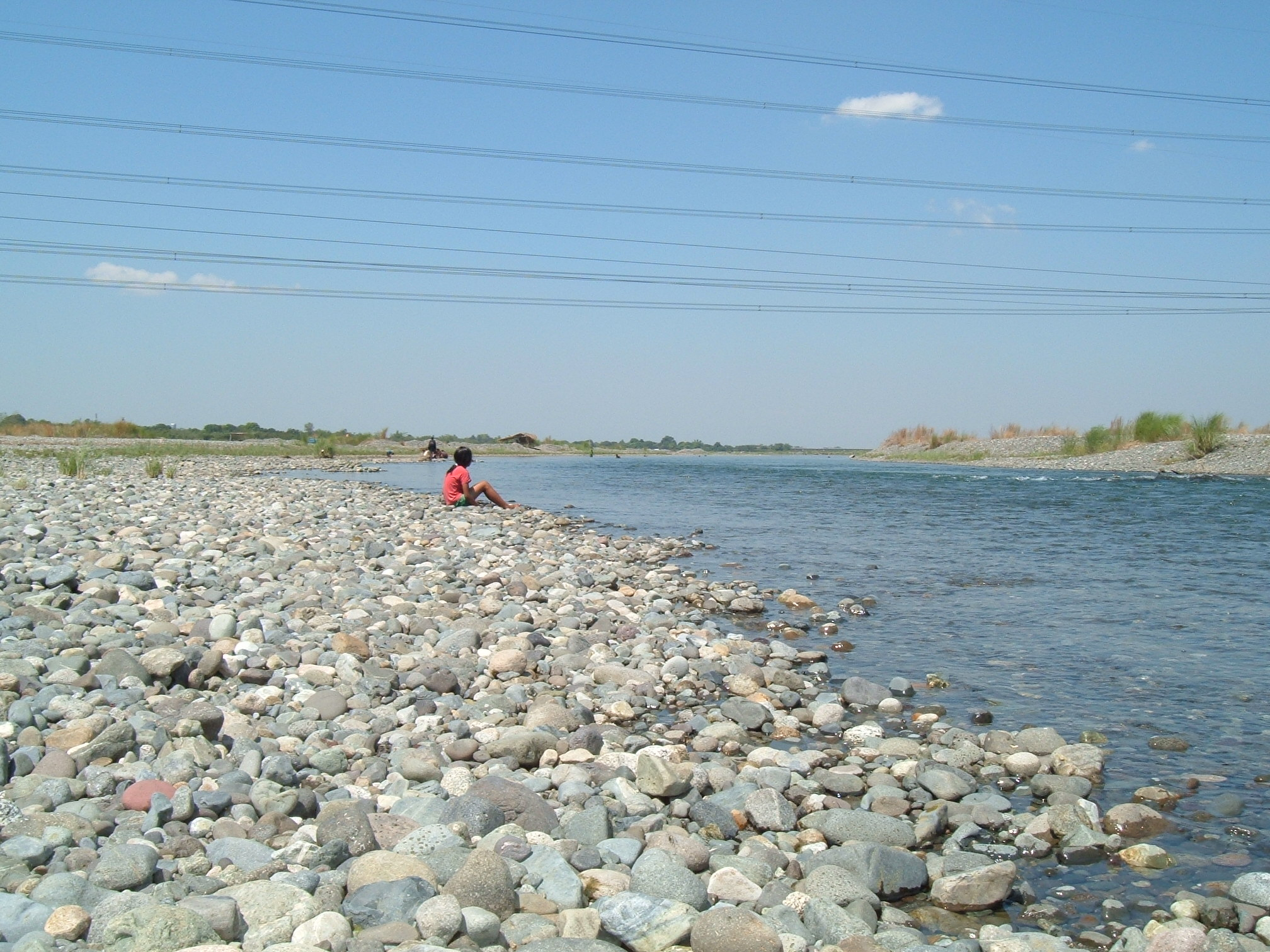
- The river in between Asingan and Santa Maria, after flowing down the San Roque Dam

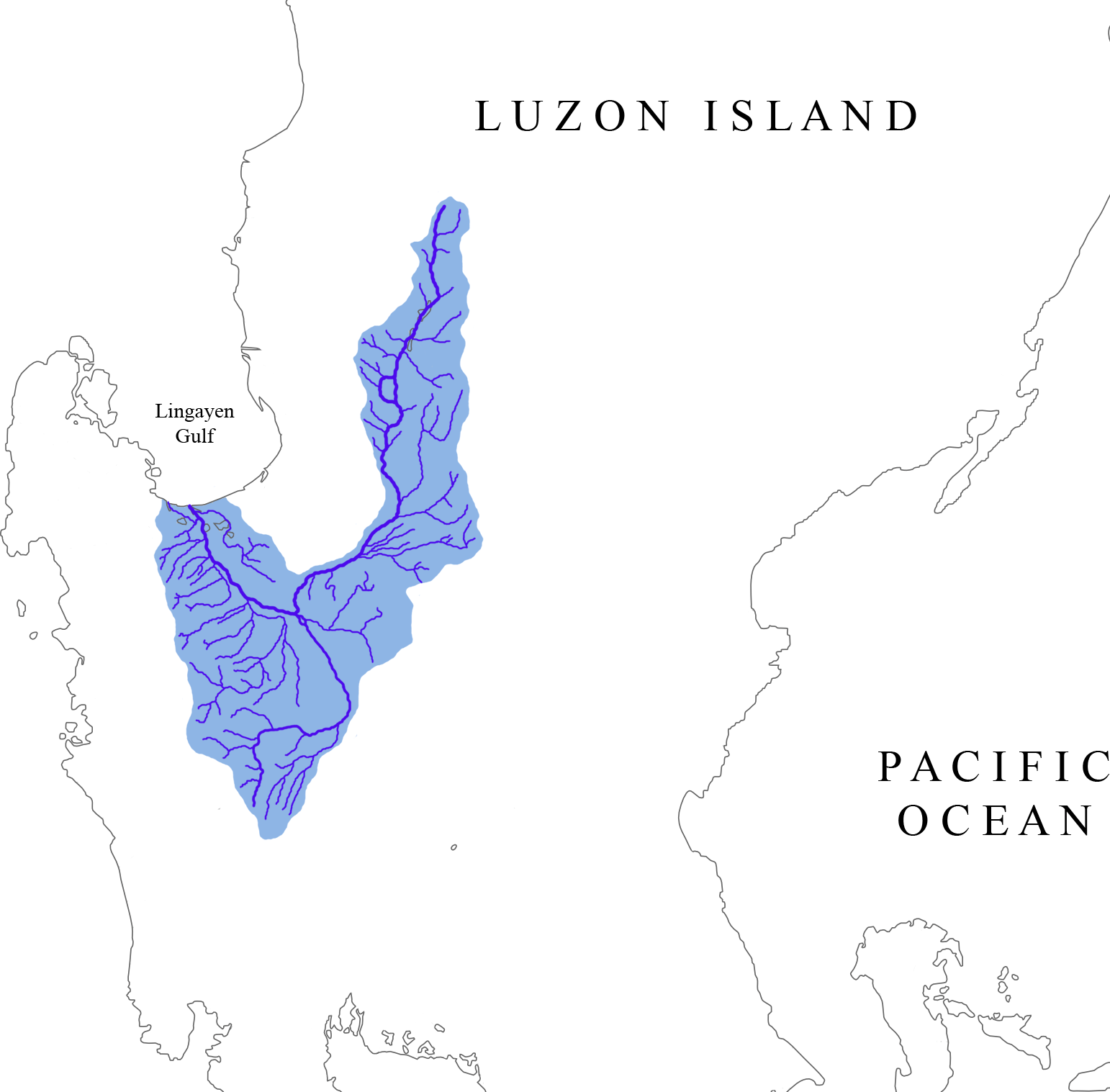
- Agno River watershed

- Agno River mouth Agno River (Philippines)

Location
- Country: Philippines
- Regions: Central Luzon; Cordillera Administrative Region; Ilocos Region
- Provinces: Benguet; Pangasinan; Tarlac
- Cities/municipality: Buguias; Kabayan; Bokod; Itogon; San Manuel; San Nicolas; Santa Maria; Asingan; Villasis; Rosales; Santo Tomas; Alcala; Bayambang; Bautista; Camiling; Urbiztondo; Mangatarem; San Carlos; Aguilar; Bugallon; Lingayen

Physical characteristics
- Source: Mount Data
  - location: Benguet, Cordillera mountains
  - coordinates: 16°49′34″N 120°53′17″E
  - elevation: 2,090 m (6,860 ft)
- Mouth: Lingayen Gulf
  - location: Lingayen, Pangasinan, Ilocos Region
  - coordinates: 16°02′17″N 120°12′00″E
  - elevation: 0 m (0 ft)
- Length: 248 km (154 mi)
- Basin size: 5,952 km^{2} (2,298 sq mi)

Basin features
- Tributaries
  - left: Tarlac River

The Agno River, also known as the Pangasinan River, is a river on the island of Luzon in the Philippines. Traversing the provinces of Benguet, Pangasinan, and Tarlac, it is one of the largest river systems in the country, with a drainage area of 5,952 square kilometres (2,298 sq mi).

The river originates in the Cordillera Mountains and empties into the South China Sea via Lingayen Gulf. The river is 248 kilometres (154 mi) long, making it the sixth longest river in the country. Roughly two million people live in the Agno River Valley, making it one of Philippines' larger population clusters.

The river is dammed by three hydroelectric power plants: the Ambuklao Dam in Bokod, the Binga Dam in Itogon, and the San Roque Dam in San Manuel.

== Geography ==
The Agno River is the main drainage system of the area and has a catchment area of 5,952 square kilometres (2,298 sq mi). It is the third largest river in Luzon (next to Cagayan River and Pampanga River) and the fifth largest river in the Philippines.

The Agno is the largest Philippine river in terms of water discharge, draining around 6.6 cubic kilometers of fresh water into Lingayen Gulf, or almost 70% of the total fresh water input into the gulf.

The headwaters of Agno River are at the slopes of Mount Data in the Cordillera Mountains at an elevation of 2,090 metres (6,860 ft), where it drains Cretaceous to Paleocene igneous basement rocks, and marine siliciclastic and carbonate rocks. Of its total length, about 90 kilometres (56 mi) runs through mountainous terrain and canyons.

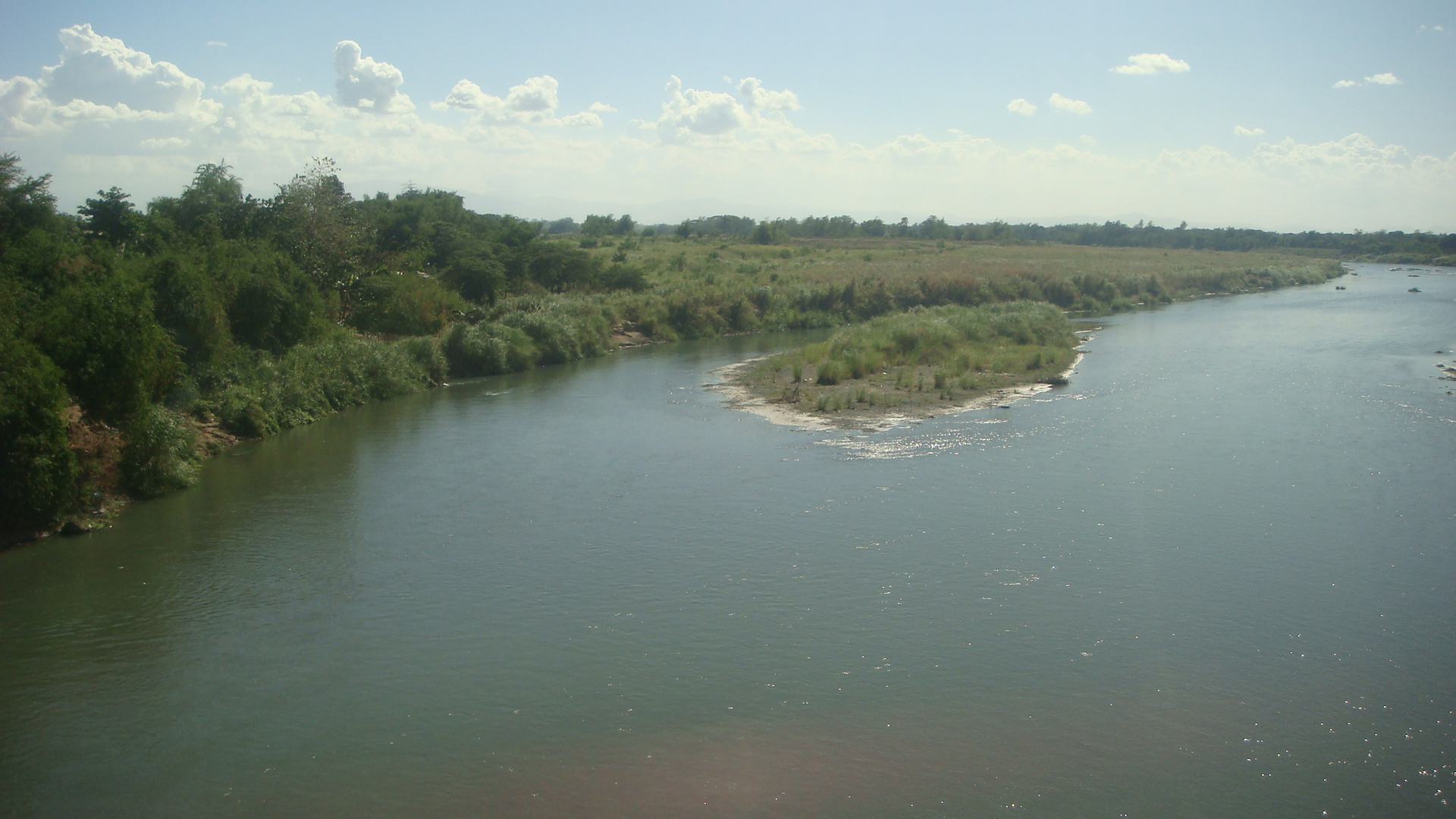
Agno River (view from Rosales, Pangasinan bridge)

As the river descends following a southerly course, it exhibits a braided channel pattern. It then transforms into a southwest-directed meandering river as it crosses the Central Luzon Plain. From its confluence with the Tarlac River emanating from the south, the Agno River then veers northward while draining the eastern flanks of the Zambales Mountains.

The Agno's principal tributaries include the Pila, Camiling, Tarlac and Ambayoan Rivers. The main branch of the Agno River is Tarlac River which originates from Mount Pinatubo (elevation 1,745 metres (5,725 ft)) in Tarlac and joins the Agno River at Poponto Swamp near Bayambang. The swamp has an area of about 25 square kilometres (9.7 sq mi) and temporarily retains flood waters from Tarlac River.

After passing through mountains at an average elevation of some 2,000 feet (610 m) ASL, the Agno River forms a vast alluvial fan and delta called the Pangasinan Plain, a historically vital economic hub on Luzon Island.

A number of faults of local and regional significance cut across the river. Joint systems are also found in the area. These faults and joints reduce the rock strength and rock coherence through which water could pass or slippage could occur.

The Philippine Fault System, including the Digdig Fault, which has been assessed as the causative fault of the July 16, 1990 Luzon earthquake, and the San Manuel Fault, Bulangit Fault and the San Roque Fault are some of the major fault lines crossing the river.

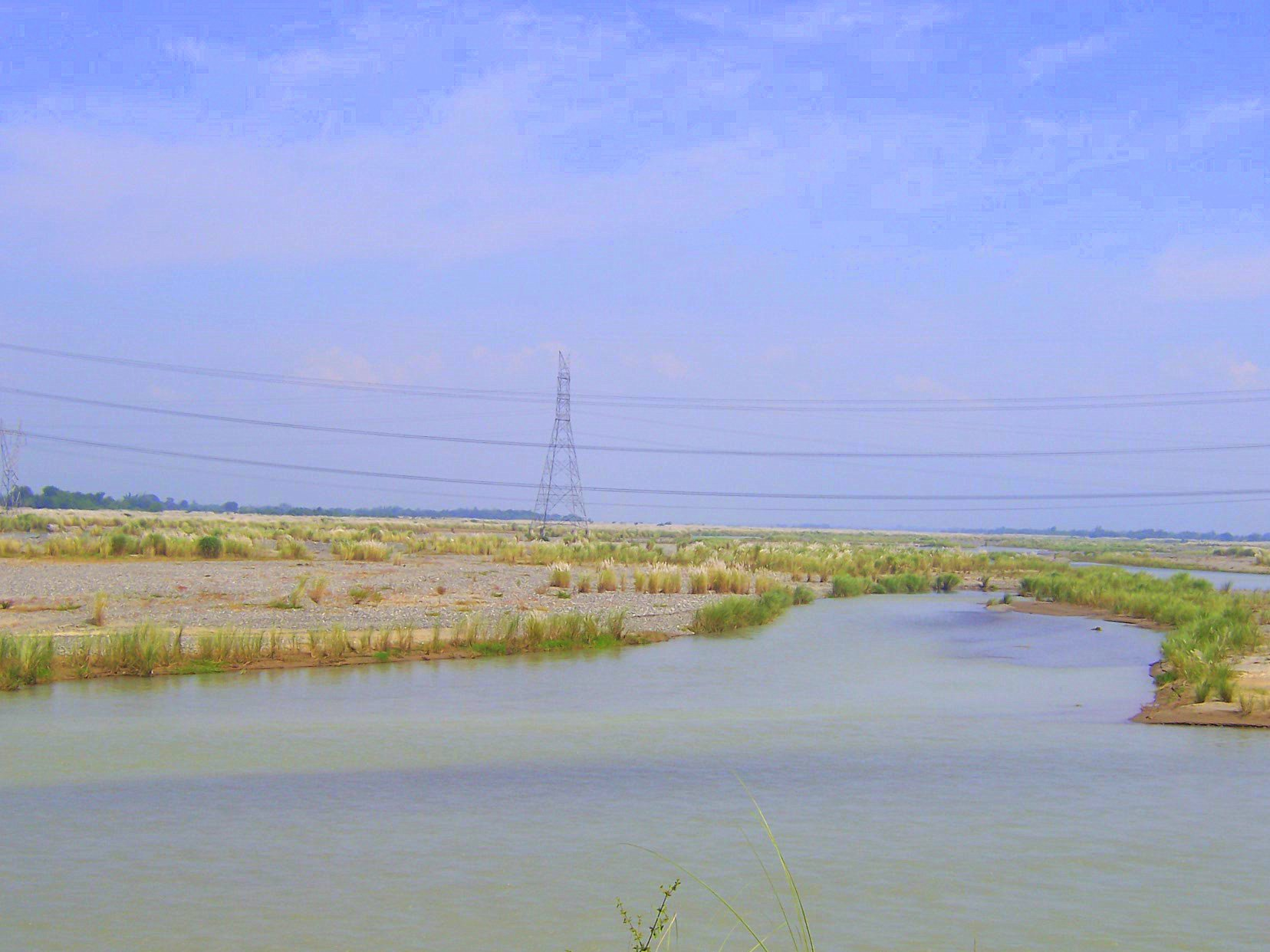
Agno River in Pangasinan

The river's headwaters and upstream basin in the Cordillera Central range are designated conservation areas that lie within the Mount Data National Park, the Upper Agno River Basin Resource Reserve and the Lower Agno Watershed Forest Reserve.

== Flora and fauna ==
Spanish explorers who documented the catchment area of the river in the 16th century say the mouth of the Agno was an extensive marshland with rich alluvial soil. It was thickly covered with mangrove and nipa palm trees which served as habitat to many marshland wildlife species.

But the catchment area is now severely deforested. Primary forest has almost completely disappeared apart from a few areas above 800 metres (2,600 ft) ASL. The forests have been replaced by grassland and riceland.

== Flooding ==
Since the Agno River basin is characterized by mountainous topography, the Ambuklao water reservoir was built to keep it from gushing down and causing devastating effects on the lower levels of the river, the flood runoff estimated annually at about 6,654 million cubic meters reaches the plain in several hours in the river mouth in about a day. Average annual rainfall varies from 2,000 millimetres (79 in) in the neighborhood of Tarlac to 4,000 millimetres (160 in) in the upper reaches of the Agno River.

The Pangasinan Plain suffers from recurrent and destructive floods. The catastrophic floods of July–August 1972, May 1976, and September 2009 inundated the entire Pangasinan Plain, including the floodplains of the Tarlac River.

The PAGASA, the national weather bureau, has established a flood monitoring and warning center in Pangasinan.

== People ==
The Agno traverses several towns in Benguet province where some 35,000 indigenous Ibaloi, Kankanaey and Kalanguya people live. The Ibaloi people of Benguet regard the river as sacred because it gives life.

Barangay Dalupirip, Itogon in Benguet province is held sacred by its people. Portions of the land serve as the burial grounds of their ancestors. The place holds great historical value and is considered one of the remaining seats of Ibaloi culture.

Archaeological sites were discovered at Sitio Camanggaan, Barangay San Roque in San Manuel, Pangasinan and in surrounding areas. Yields consisted of tradeware and earthenware shards and Palaeolithic and Neolithic stone tools.

== Economic importance ==
Gold panning was common along the river, with gold found along the river from Kabayan, Benguet, to San Manuel, Pangasinan, and along its tributaries in Tublay, Benguet, and Bokod, Benguet.

The river has three hydroelectric plants: Binga Dam in Itogon, Benguet (29 kilometres (18 mi) upstream); Ambuklao Dam in Bokod, Benguet (37 kilometres (23 mi) upstream) and the San Roque Dam in San Manuel, Pangasinan. Binga has been operational since 1960 and Ambuklao since 1956.

There are several mining concessions in the upper reaches of the river.

The government has also established the Agno River irrigation system to provide irrigation water to some 60 to 100 square kilometers of ricelands in Pangasinan.

== Crossings ==
This is listed from mouth to source.

1. Domalandan Bridge (Lingayen–Labrador Road, Lingayen)
2. Bugallon Bridge ( N55 (Romulo Highway), Bugallon)
3. Bocboc Bridge (Gallego Street, Aguilar–San Carlos boundary)
4. Mangatarem–Urbiztondo Road (Mangatarem, Pangasinan–Urbiztondo, Pangasinan boundary)
5. President Carlos P. Romulo Bridge (Camiling–Malasiqui–Santa Barbara Rd, Bayambang–Camiling, Tarlac boundary)
6. Calvo Bridge (Alcala–Bayambang Road, Bayambang–Bautista boundary)
7. Teofilo Sison Bridge ( N2 (MacArthur Highway), Rosales–Villasis boundary)
8. Tomana Underpass ( E1 (Tarlac–Pangasinan–La Union Expressway), Rosales–Villasis boundary)
9. Narciso Ramos Bridge (Santa Maria–Binalonan Road, Asingan, Pangasinan)
10. Ambuklao By-pass Bridge ( N110 (Benguet–Nueva Vizcaya Road), Bokod)
11. Liboong Hanging Bridge (Bokod)
12. Bokod–Kabayan–Buguias–Abatan Road (Buguias, Benguet)

== Cities and municipalities ==
The following list shows the cities and towns traversed by the Agno River, ordered upstream going downstream:

- Buguias, Benguet (location of Mount Data)
- Kabayan, Benguet
- Bokod, Benguet (drains into the Ambuklao Dam)
- Itogon, Benguet (drains into the Binga Dam)
- San Manuel, Pangasinan (drains into the San Roque Dam)
- San Nicolas, Pangasinan
- Santa Maria, Pangasinan
- Asingan, Pangasinan
- Villasis, Pangasinan
- Rosales, Pangasinan
- Santo Tomas, Pangasinan
- Alcala, Pangasinan
- Bayambang, Pangasinan
- Bautista, Pangasinan
- Camiling, Tarlac
- Urbiztondo, Pangasinan
- Mangatarem, Pangasinan
- San Carlos City, Pangasinan
- Aguilar, Pangasinan
- Bugallon, Pangasinan
- Lingayen, Pangasinan (location of river mouth)
- Labrador, Pangasinan
