= Lower Agno Watershed Forest Reserve =

Protected area in Luzon, Philippines

- IUCN category V (protected landscape/seascape)
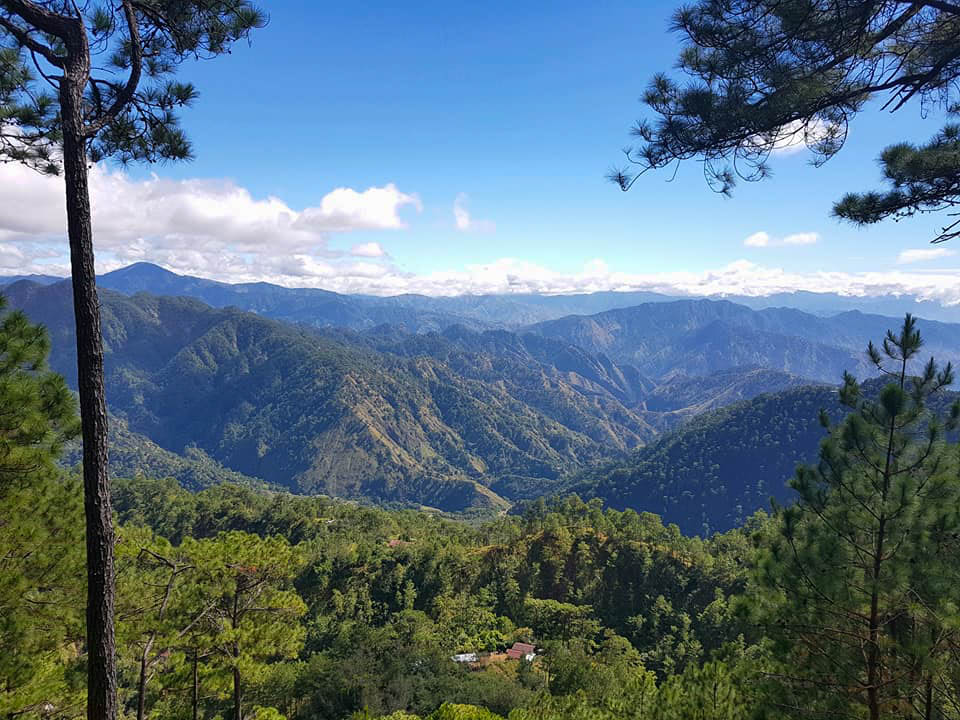
- Forest reserve in Ampucao, Itogon from the summit of Mount Ulap

- Location within Luzon Location within Philippines
- Location: Benguet and Pangasinan, Philippines
- Nearest city: Baguio
- Coordinates: 16°16′23″N 120°44′51″E
- Area: 39,304 hectares (97,120 acres)
- Established: November 22, 1983
- Governing body: Department of Environment and Natural Resources; National Power Corporation; San Roque Power Corporation; National Irrigation Administration

The Lower Agno Watershed Forest Reserve is a Philippine protected area that straddles the Cordillera and Ilocos regions encompassing land from the provinces of Benguet and Pangasinan. Operated by the Lower Agno WFR Protected Area Management Board under the Department of Environment and Natural Resources, Lower Agno follows the Agno River corridor from the northern villages of Itogon to just north of the municipalities of San Manuel and San Nicolas. The reserve also known as the San Roque Watershed protects the mid-Agno River basin with its meandering river and short tributaries in a pine-forested mountainous terrain at the southern end of the Cordillera Central, around 30 kilometres (19 mi) southeast of Baguio. It is located in an important mining district and includes the reservoir of the San Roque Dam, the largest dam in the country and the prime source of water, hydropower and irrigation for surrounding regions in Luzon.

== History ==
Lower Agno was initially part of the 699,206.09-hectare (1,727,775.9-acre) Central Cordillera Forest Reserve established on February 16, 1929 through Proclamation No. 217 issued by Governor-General Henry L. Stimson, which declared 81.8% of the entire Igorot minority lands in the Cordilleras as protected area. In a 1932 amendment, several parcels of land with an aggregate area of 1,026.8931 hectares (2,537.508 acres) were excluded from the forest reserve and converted into mining areas after 146 mineral claims were approved by Governor Theodore Roosevelt Jr. More areas at the resource-rich forests of the Central Cordillera in Itogon and Tuba were opened up to mining in succeeding years by President Manuel L. Quezon, including 177.1203 hectares (437.674 acres) in the Itogon barrio of Talnag in 1938, 596.8853 hectares (1,474.936 acres) in Tuba and Itogon in 1939, and 17.5547 hectares (43.379 acres) in the barrios of Acupan, Antamok, Chalecno, Gumatdang and Virac in 1941.

The Agno River Development Program was conceived in 1946 as part of the Philippine Power Program under President Manuel Roxas. The program involved the construction of six hydropower facilities along the river, with the first two, the Ambuklao (Agno I) and Binga (Agno II) dams, having been completed in 1956 and 1960 respectively. The Ambuklao-Binga sub-basin was then declared a separate forest reserve in 1966.

The Lower Agno reservation was established on November 22, 1983 as part of the creation of the third dam, the San Roque Dam (Agno V). An initial 39,304 hectares (97,120 acres) of the Cordillera Central Forest Reserve was set aside for water resource protection and conservation by the Ministry of Natural Resources–Bureau of Forest Development, with 9,550 hectares (23,600 acres) reserved for the multi-purpose dam project of the National Power Corporation approved by President Ferdinand Marcos on May 5, 1981. The San Roque Dam eventually began construction in 1998 and was completed on May 1, 2003.

== Geography ==
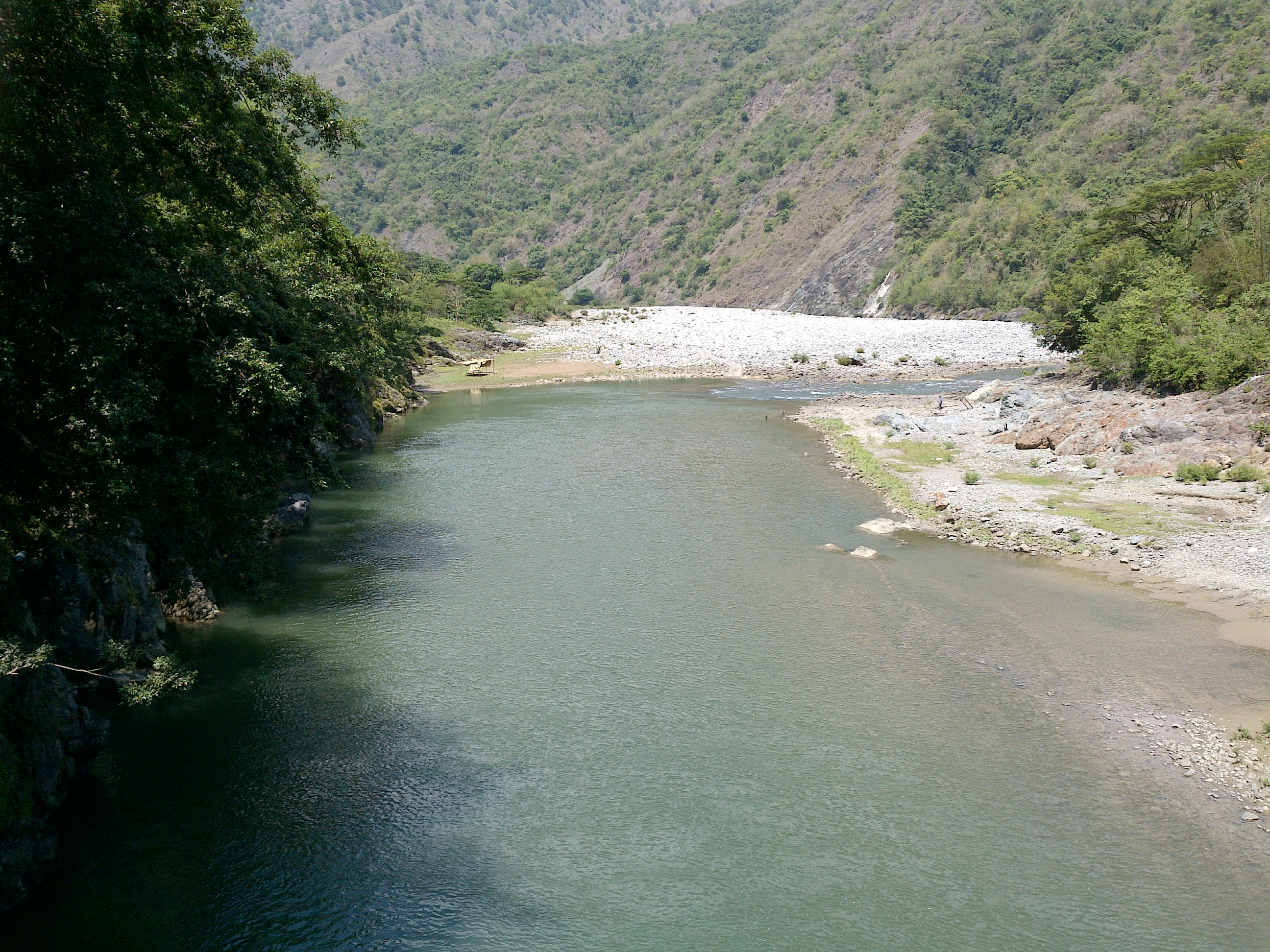
Dalupirip section of Agno River within the forest reserve in Itogon

The Lower Agno reserve protects a 34.59-kilometre (21.49 mi)-long valley along the Agno River from just downstream of Binga Dam in the mountain village of Tinongdan to the foothills and alluvial plains of San Roque in San Manuel immediately below the San Roque dam and reservoir. The 39,304-hectare (97,120-acre) reservation is located primarily in Itogon in the southern Cordillera Central, with small areas extending westward into Baguio and Tuba and southward into San Roque village, San Manuel and San Felipe East in San Nicolas. About 90 percent of the total land area of Itogon lies within the reservation.

The protected area has a mean elevation of 889.33 metres (2,917.7 ft) with peaks rising to 2,164.60 metres (7,101.7 ft) above sea level. Its highest point is Mount Ugo situated at its northeastern end. To the west, the valley is flanked by a sub-chain of the Cordillera Central that includes the 1,829-metre (6,001 ft) high Mount Ulap and the 1,334-metre (4,377 ft) high Mount Kotkot that separate it from the Bued River basin of Tuba. Other prominent peaks in the reserve include the 1,328 metres (4,357 ft) Mount Pigingan, Mount Ave Maria (Bidawan) and Mount Marikit. Its lowest point is the San Roque Dam site at 100 metres (330 ft).

The reserve is one of six protected areas located in the 623,318.69-hectare (1,540,254.0-acre) Agno River Basin, the third largest river system in Luzon and the Philippines' fifth largest. It is a sub-catchment of the Agno River which drains into Lingayen Gulf from its headwaters at Mount Data further north. Its main tributary within the reservation is Twin River at its northern portion which has its source in the peaks around Baguio and which splits into several streams in the Gumatdang mining village, including the Ambalanga River, Liang Creek and Batuang Creek. The central and southern sections of the reserve are fed by other branches of the Agno River, namely the Laboy and Ambayoan rivers as well as several streams in the Padcal mining area of Ampucao and Dalupirip villages including Balog River, Albian Creek, Manaa and Salangan Creek.

The geology of Lower Agno WFR is characterized as predominantly mountain type dominated by undifferentiated and igneous intrusive rocks from the Miocene and Pliocene periods with minor outcrops of sedimentary and metamorphic rocks. It has pockets of silt, sandy and clay loam near its reservoir in Pangasinan.

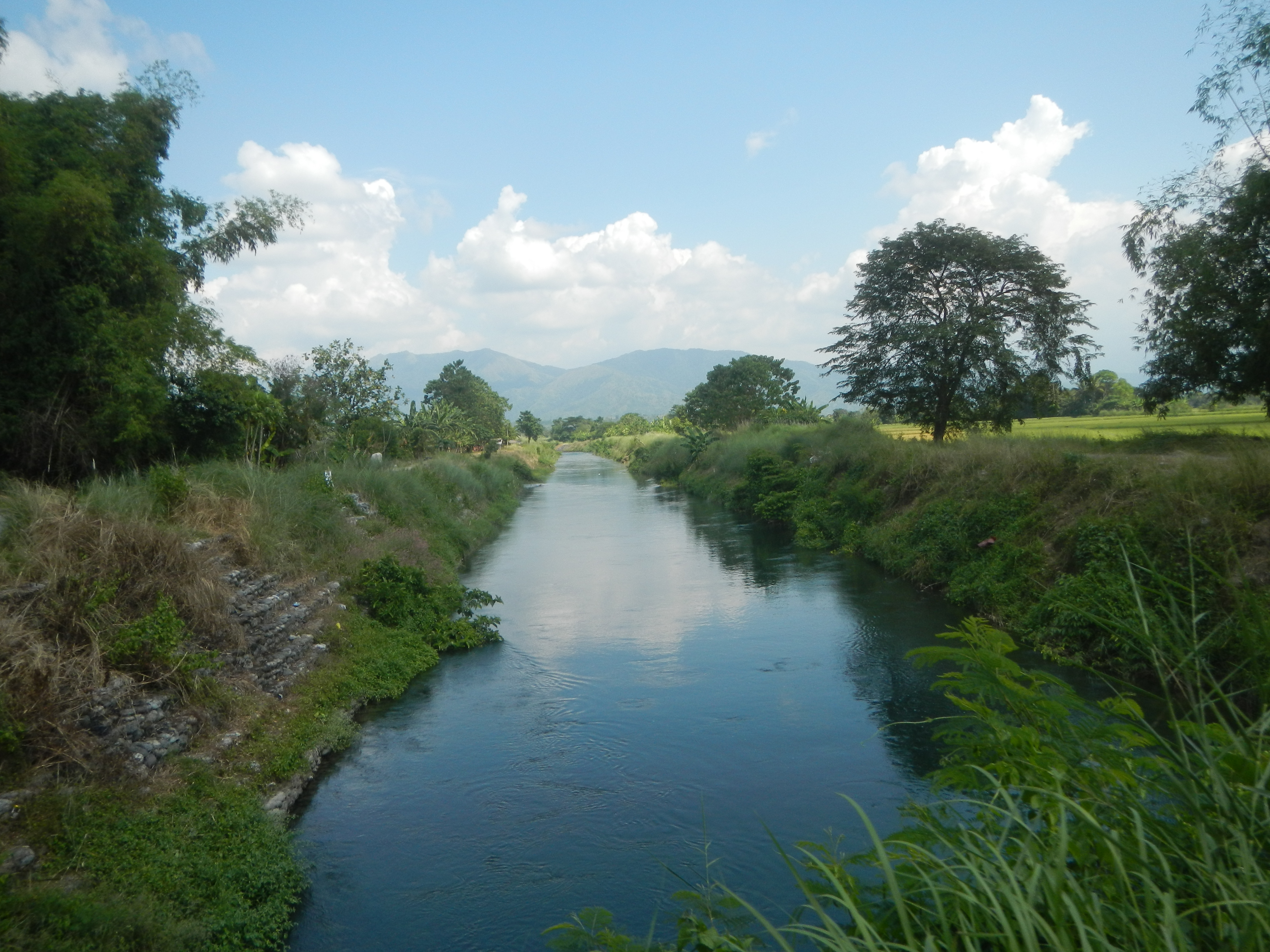
An irrigation canal just below the San Roque Dam in Narra, San Manuel

Lower Agno is bounded to the west by both operating and abandoned gold and copper mining areas. Mining activities have been conducted in the area since 1906 with the opening of Benguet Corp.'s Acupan Mine. The gold mining company also operates the Antamok, Baco and Kelly sites along the Ambalanga River just east of Baguio and the Balatoc Mill. The Agno tributary of Ambalanga is also the site of the Itogon Mine of Itogon-Suyoc company which opened in 1926. South of these gold mines along the Albian and Manaa creeks are the Santo Tomas (Padcal) copper mines of Philex Mining Corp. which began operations in 1958.

The reservation is in the ancestral domain of the Kalanguya, Ibaloy and Iwaak minorities.

== Ecology ==
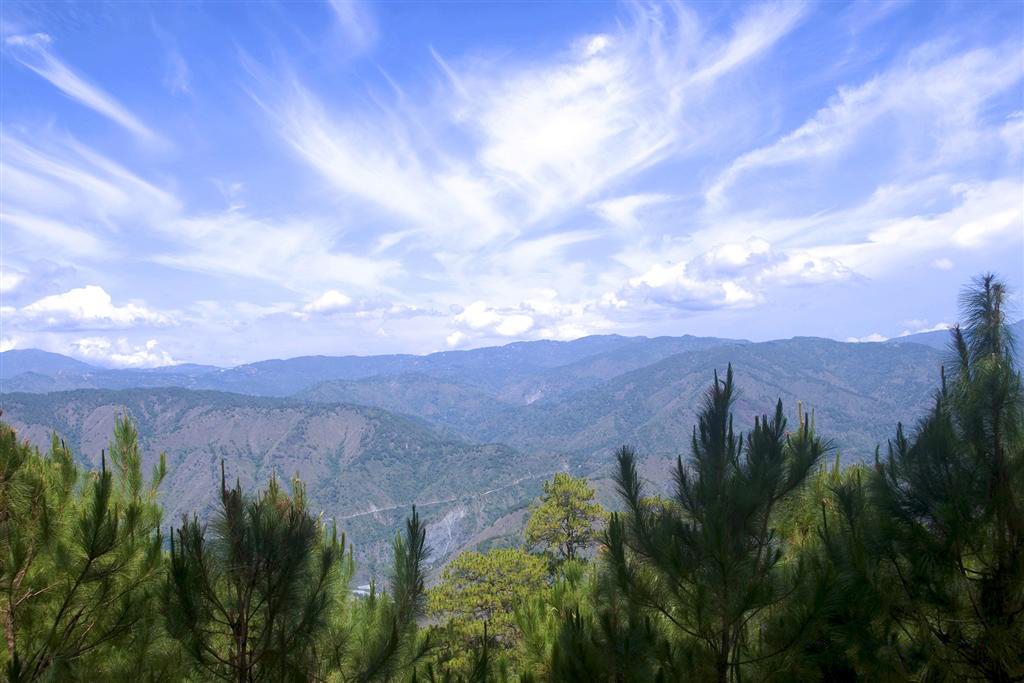
Pinus kesiya foliage at Mount Ugo

Lower Agno is part of the Central Cordillera Terrestrial Biogeographic Region and contains mossy and tropical subalpine forests, second-growth tropical lower montane forests, grasslands and agricultural lands in lower elevations. The Pinus kesiya (Benguet pine) is the most dominant vegetation in the tropical subalpine forests of the reserve.

Lower Agno is a habitat of the Philippine deer, Philippine long-tailed macaque, Philippine warty pig, Northern Luzon giant cloud rat, Philippine cobra, monitor lizard and Malayan civet. At least eleven raptors have been documented in the reserve, including the Philippine hawk-eagle, eastern osprey, brahminy kite, Philippine serpent eagle, white-bellied sea eagle, rufous-bellied eagle, black-shouldered kite, crested honey buzzard, barred honey buzzard and Philippine falconet.

== Gallery ==
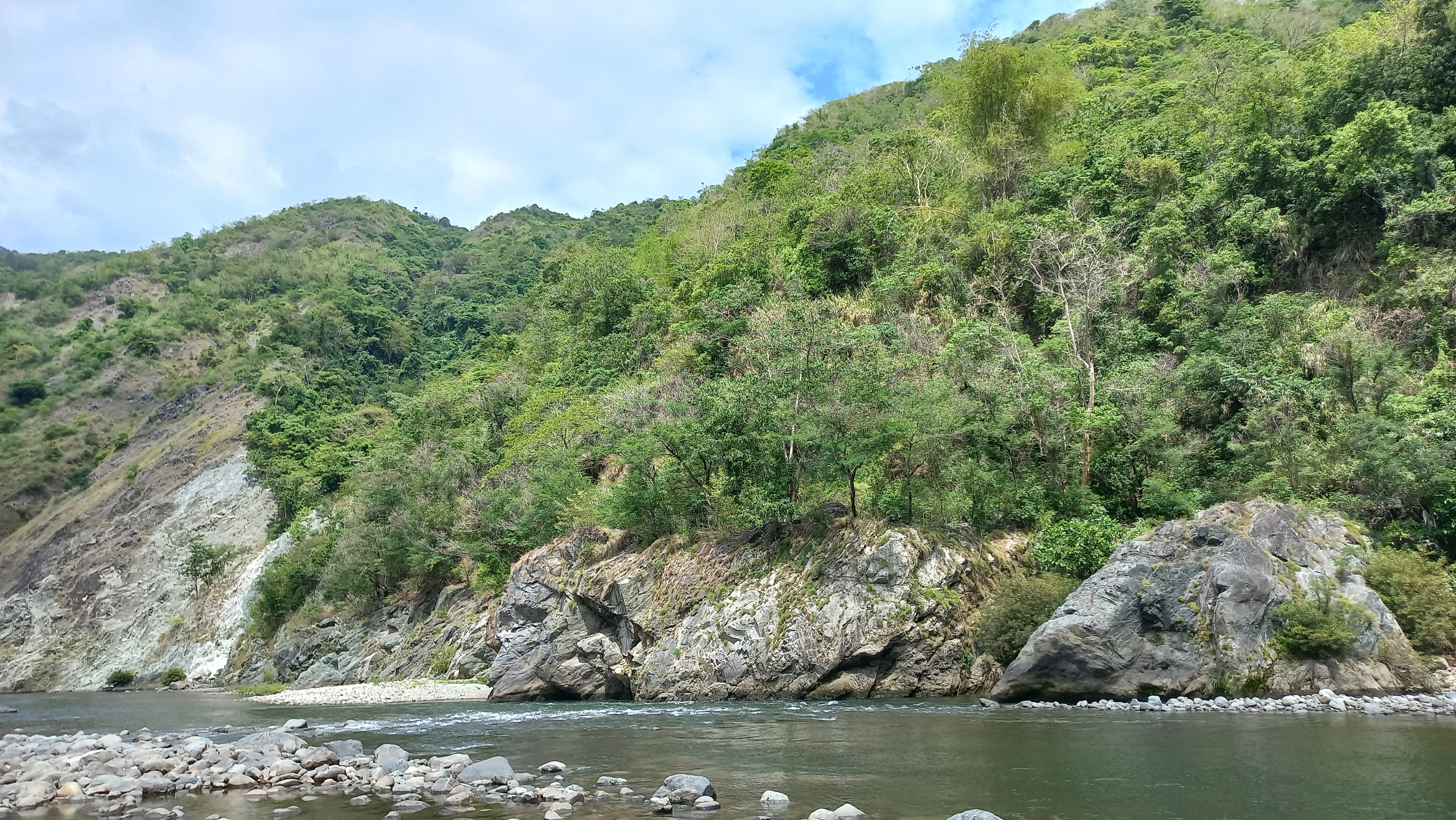
An outcrop of the Dalupirip schist covered with vegetation, exposed along the Agno riverside, Dalupirip, Itogon, Benguet.

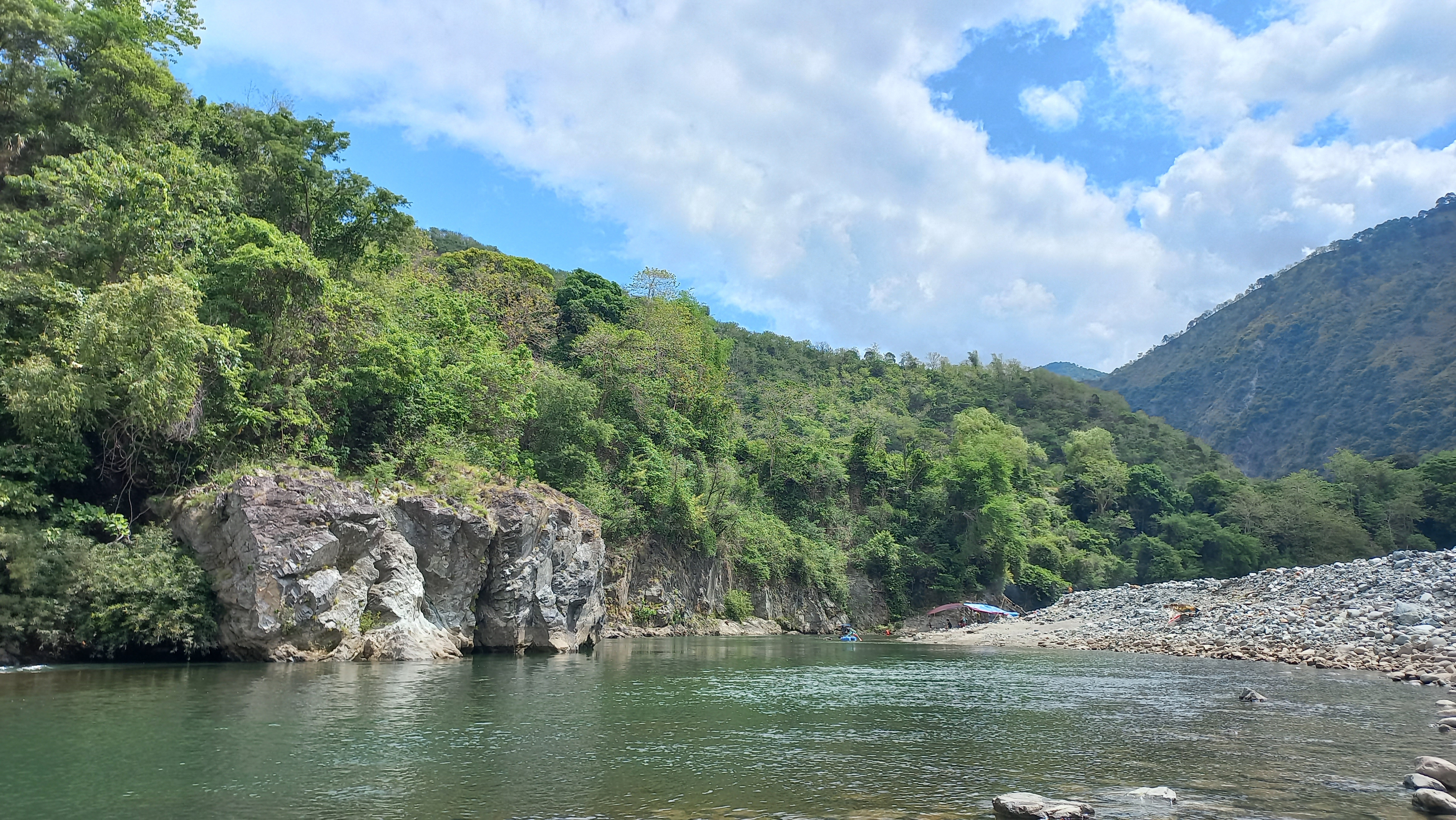
An outcrop of the Dalupirip schist covered with vegetation, exposed along the Agno riverside, Dalupirip, Itogon, Benguet. A jutted outcrop shows distinct deformation in the schist.

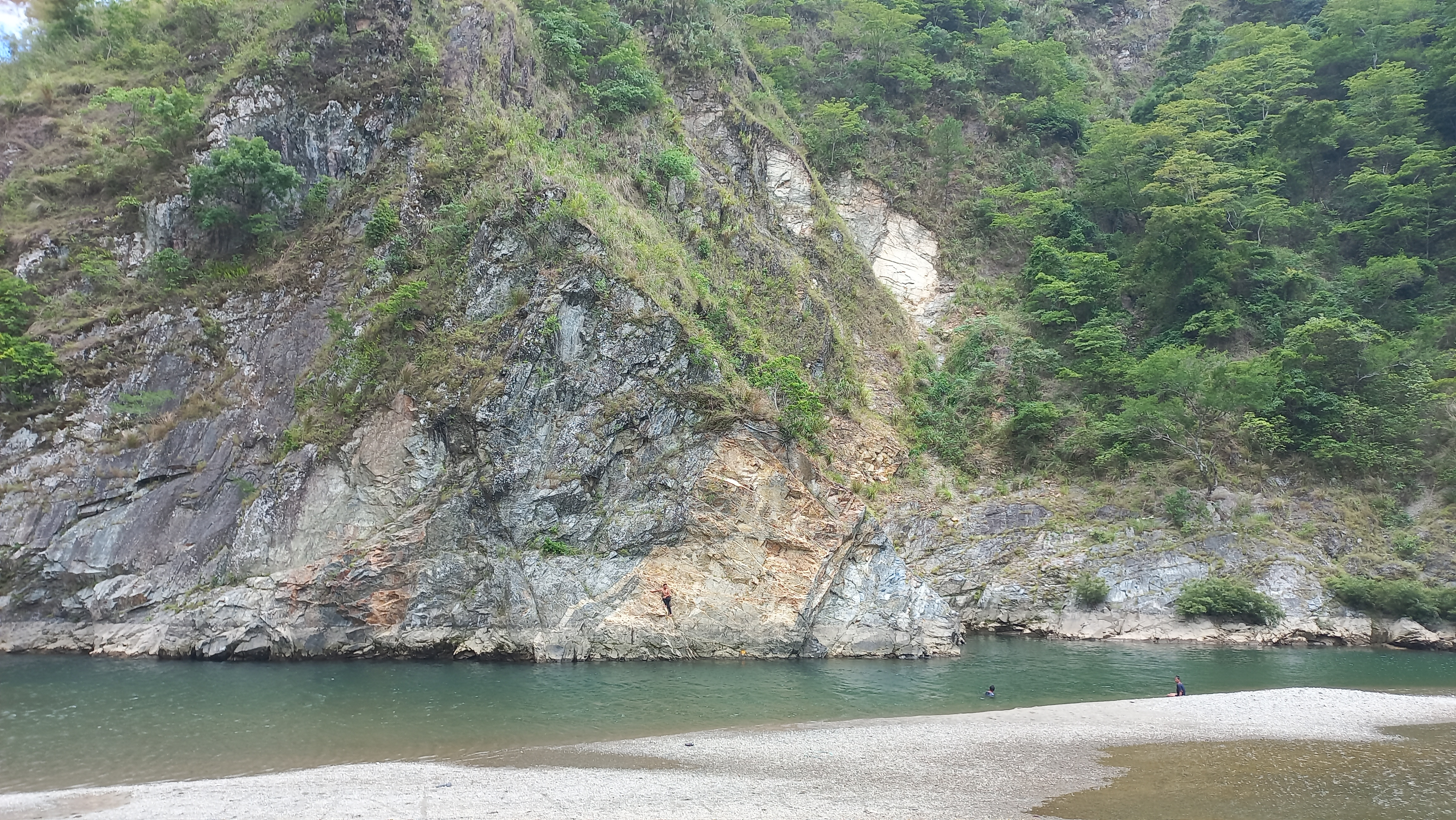
Diorite dike intruding outcrop of the Dalupirip schist exposed somewhere in the Dalupirip segment of the Agno River.
