= Binga Dam =

Dam in Benguet, Philippines

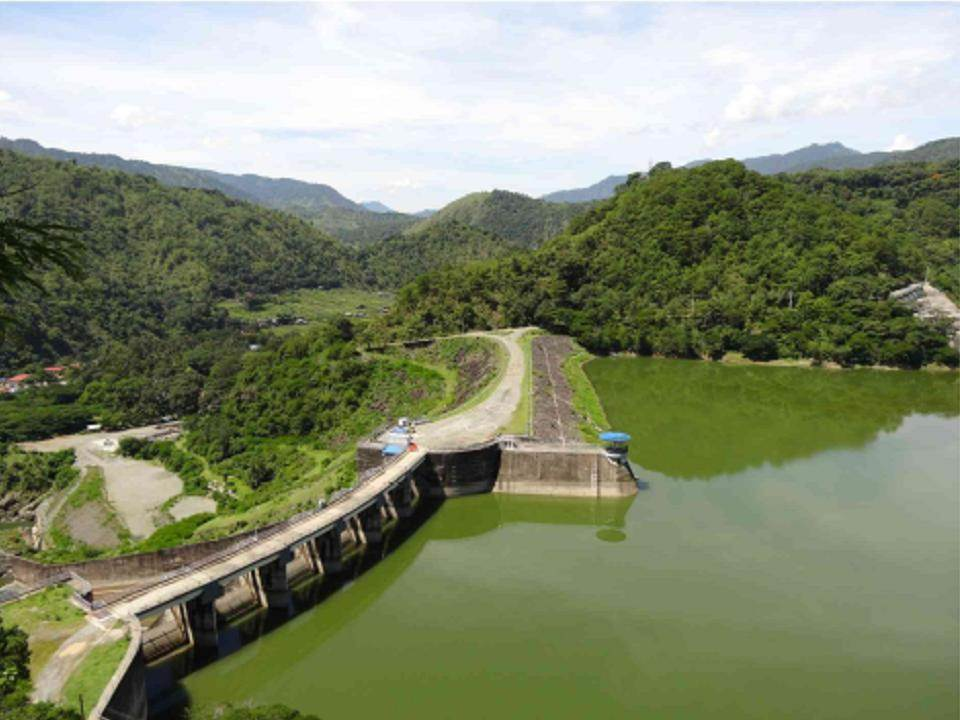

- Location in Luzon Location in the Philippines
- Official name: Binga Hydroelectric Power Plant
- Location: Brgy. Tinongdan, Itogon, Benguet
- Coordinates: 16°24′00″N 120°43′30″E
- Construction began: August 1956
- Opening date: May 1960
- Construction cost: $ 18.50 Million (at current price)
- Owners: National Power Corporation; SN Aboitiz Power‑Benguet, Inc.

Dam and spillways
- Type of dam: Storage, Earth and Rock fill
- Impounds: Agno River
- Height: 107.37 metres (352.3 ft)
- Length: 215 metres (705 ft)
- Spillway type: Tainter radial Gates, motor driven Hoist, Chain lift Type

Reservoir
- Total capacity: 87.44 million cubic meters
- Maximum water depth: 193 metres (633 ft)

Power Station
- Turbines: 4 units, Francis Vertical Shaft
- Installed capacity: 140 MW

Binga Dam is a dam in Agno River connected to a hydroelectric power plant situated at Barrio Binga, Barangay Tinongdan in the municipality of Itogon in Benguet province of the Philippines.

The dam was constructed in August 1956 and opened in May 1960 under the government-owned National Power Corporation (NAPOCOR), three years after its sister facility, the Ambuklao Dam. It is located 31 kilometres (19 mi) southeast of Baguio and 19 kilometres (12 mi) downstream of Ambuklao Dam within the Upper Agno River Basin Resource Reserve. Improvement of the dam is ongoing, after it received heavy damage during the 1990 Luzon earthquake, and its installed capacity of 100 MW is being upgraded to 140MW.

The Binga facility was constructed in 1956 for power generation and flood control. The dam and other non-power components are owned by the government through the National Power Corporation.

== Binga Hydro ==
On November 28, 2007, SNAP-Benguet won the public bid for Binga hydro and its neighboring power facility Ambuklao, which were sold as a package under the power sector privatization program of the Philippine government. It took over operations on July 10, 2008. Only the power components were privatized while the dams remain government-owned.

SNAP-Benguet is a joint venture between SN Power of Norway and Aboitiz Power Corporation of the Philippines.

In 2010, Binga underwent refurbishment to increase its capacity from 100 MW to 125 MW. The project was completed in July 2013. In 2014, Binga underwent uprating work and increased its capacity to 140 MW.

Binga hydro operates as a peaking plant and is also capable of providing ancillary services needed to stabilize the grid.

== See also ==
- Water supply and sanitation in the Philippines
- Energy in the Philippines
