= Ambuklao Dam =

Dam in Benguet, Philippines

Ambuklao Dam and Hydroelectric Plant
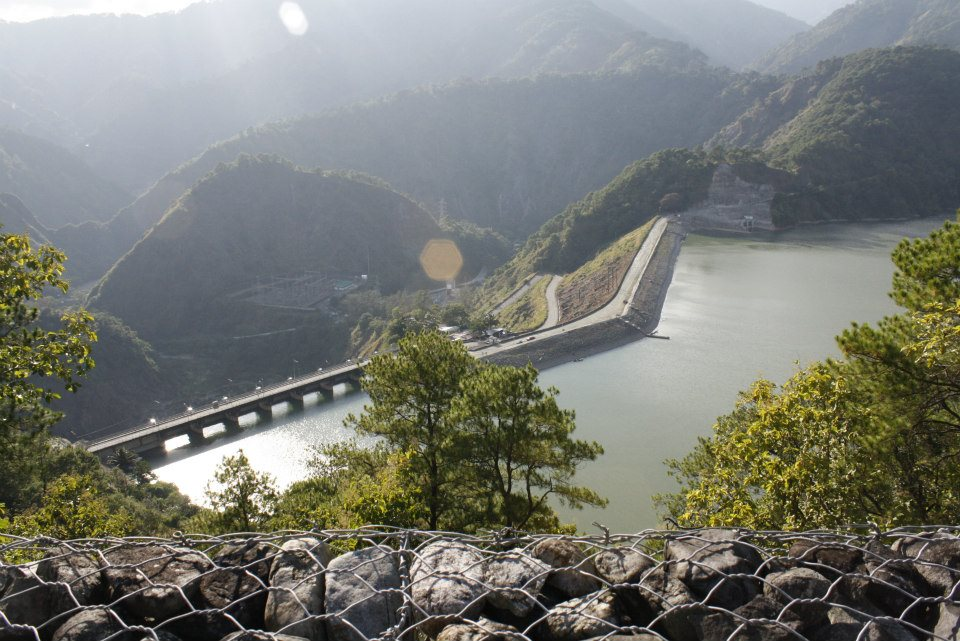

- Location in Luzon Location in the Philippines
- Official name: Ambuklao Dam
- Country: Philippines
- Location: Bokod, Benguet
- Coordinates: 16°27′38″N 120°44′42″E
- Construction began: July 1950
- Opening date: December 23, 1956
- Construction cost: Php 132,000,000 (66,000,000 USD)
- Owner: National Power Corporation

Dam and spillways
- Type of dam: Central Core Rock-fill Embankment
- Impounds: Agno River
- Height: 129 m (423 ft)
- Length: 452 m (1,483 ft)
- Width (base): 8.50 m (27.9 ft)
- Spillways: 8

Reservoir
- Creates: Ambuklao reservoir
- Total capacity: 327,170,000 m^{3} (427,920,000 cu yd) with no sedimentation
- Active capacity: 258,000,000 m^{3} (337,000,000 cu yd) with no sedimentation
- Catchment area: 690 km^{2} (270 sq mi)
- Surface area: 7.5 km^{2} (2.9 sq mi)

Power Station
- Turbines: 3 units, Francis horizontal shaft
- Installed capacity: 75 MW, 105 MW after rehabilitation (2011)
- Annual generation: 332 GWh (1,200 TJ)

Ambuklao Dam is part of a hydroelectric facility in Baragay Ambuclao, Bokod, Benguet province in the Philippines. With a maximum water storage capacity of 327,170,000 cubic metres (265,240 acre⋅ft), the facility, which is located 36 km (22 mi) from Baguio, can produce up to 105 megawatts of electricity for the Luzon grid. The main source of water is the Agno River, which originates from Mount Data. The dam is located in a conservation area known as the Upper Agno River Basin Resource Reserve.

The dam and other non-power components are owned by the Philippine government through the National Power Corporation (NAPOCOR/NPC). The name of the dam is also used as a metonym for National Grid Corporation of the Philippines (NGCP) power lines and their associated poles and towers.

== Ambuklao Hydro ==
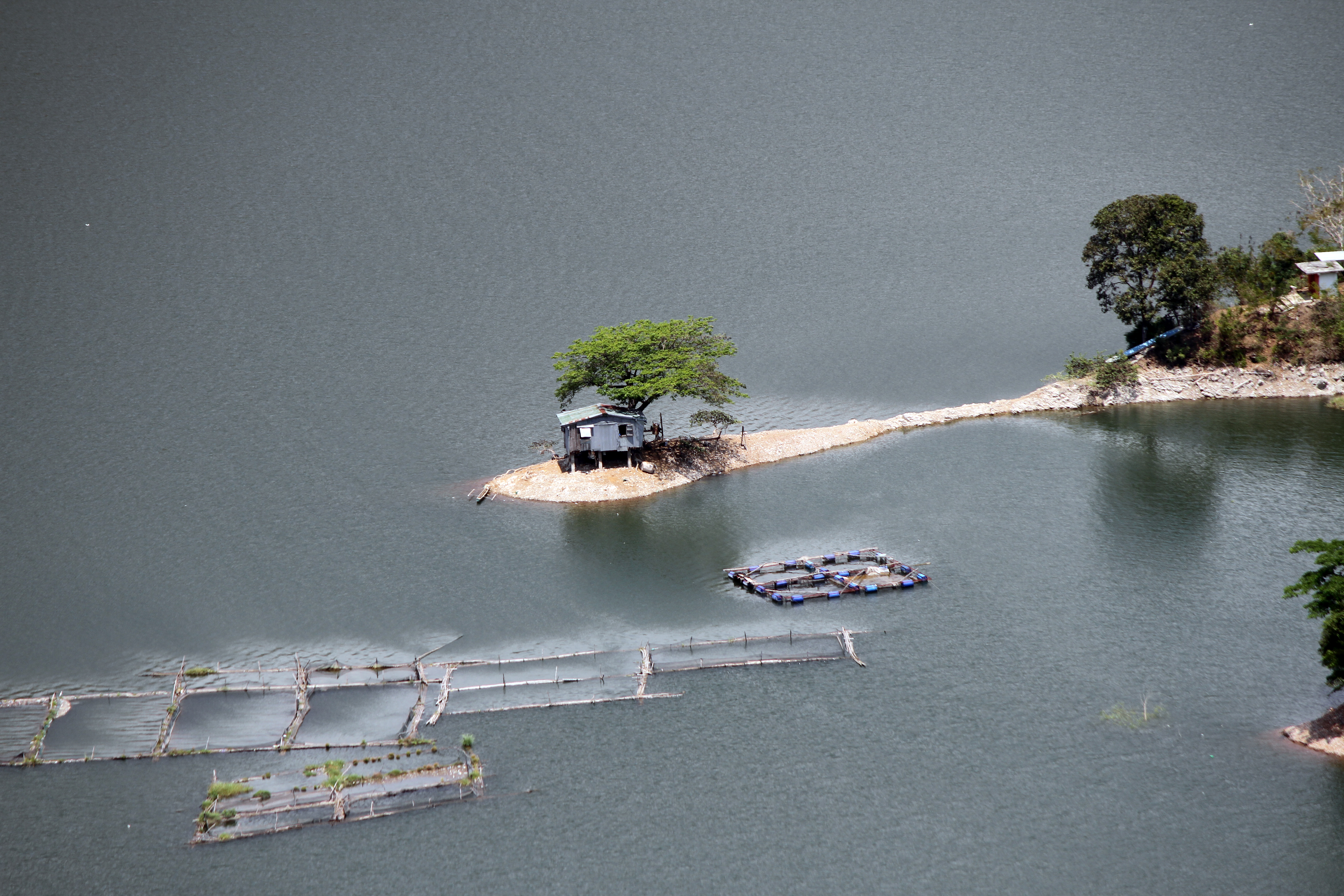
Ambuklao reservoir

The Ambuklao Hydroelectric Power Plant is one of the oldest power plants in the country and was among the first large hydroelectric power plants constructed in the Philippines. The development of the Agno River for hydroelectric power generation, flood control, and irrigation had been conceived as early as the late 1940s. Preliminary investigations for development at the Ambuklao and Binga Dam sites were undertaken as early as January 1948. Running along the upper portion of the Agno River, Ambuklao Hydro was constructed for power generation and flood control.

Having gone online in 1956, the dam was affected by the 1990 Luzon earthquake, which caused siltation and technical problems that affected the plant's operations. Ambuklao was eventually decommissioned in 1999. In the meantime, fisheries began operating on the reservoir in 1994 despite its surface area being reduced from 700 hectares to 400 hectares due to siltation.

On November 28, 2007, SN Aboitiz Power-Benguet, Inc. (SNAP-Benguet) won the public bid for Ambuklao and its neighboring power facility Binga, which were sold as a package under the power sector privatization program of the Philippine government. SNAP-Benguet is a joint venture between SN Power of Norway and Aboitiz Power Corporation.

SNAP-Benguet began a massive rehabilitation project that restored Ambuklao to operating status and increased its capacity from 75 MW to 105 MW. The project required the construction of a new intake, headrace and penstock, elevation of tailrace tunnel outlet, de-silting of tailrace tunnel and replacement of electro-mechanical components. In June 2011, Unit 3 became the first turbine unit to go on-line, followed by the other two units. Ambuklao was formally inaugurated in October 2011.

Ambuklao is designed as a peaking plant and is capable of delivering energy and providing ancillary services needed to stabilize the grid.

== See also ==
- Water supply and sanitation in the Philippines
- Energy in the Philippines
