= Bokod, Benguet =

Municipality in Benguet, Philippines

Bokod
- Municipality
- Municipality of Bokod
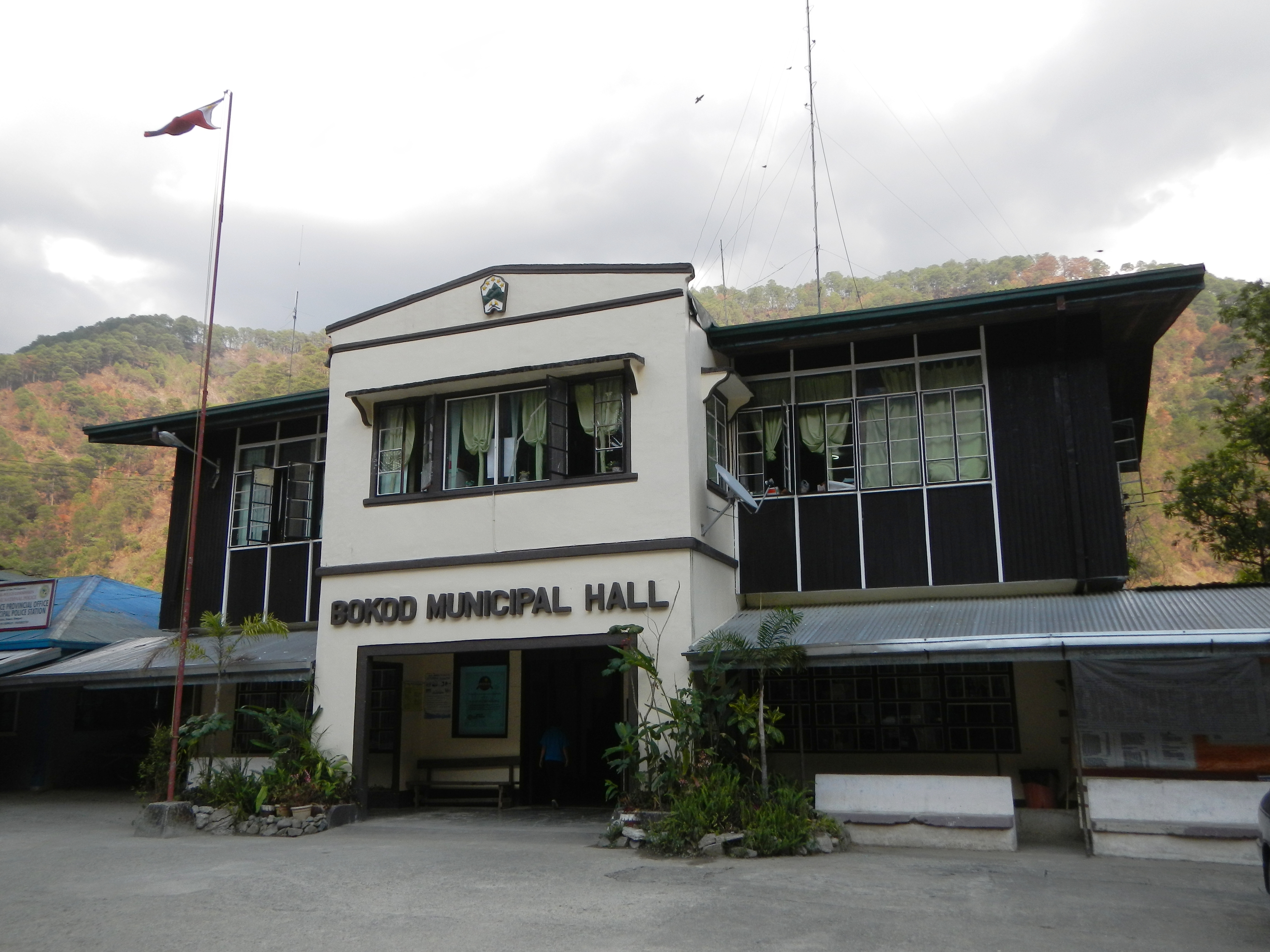
- Municipal hall

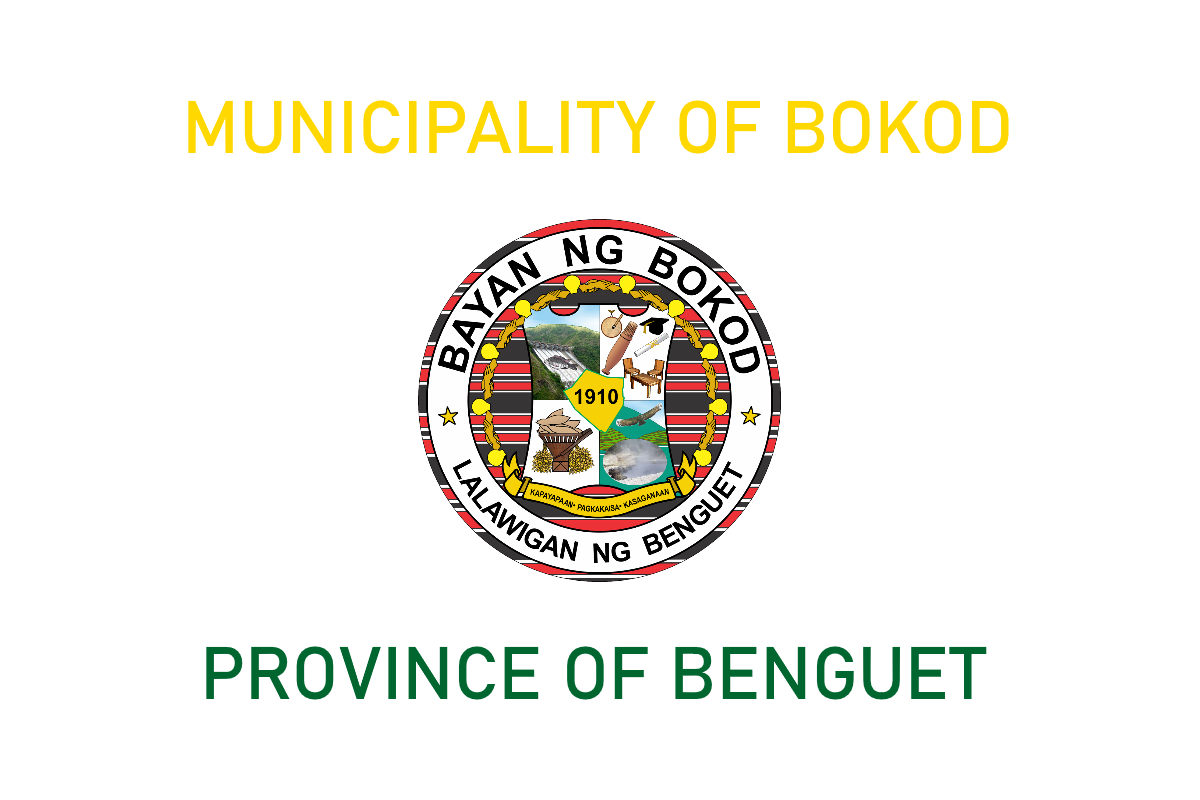
- Flag Seal

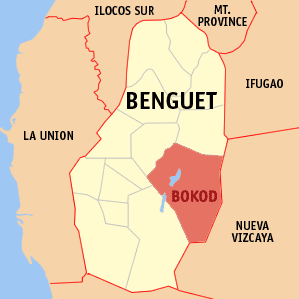
- Map of Benguet with Bokod highlighted
- Interactive map of Bokod
- Location within the Philippines
- Coordinates: 16°29′29″N 120°49′48″E
- Country: Philippines
- Region: Cordillera Administrative Region
- Province: Benguet
- District: Lone district
- Founded: 1910
- Barangays: 10 (see Barangays)

Government
  - Type: Sangguniang Bayan
  - Mayor: Atty. Erik Donn Ignacio
  - Vice Mayor: Doroteo S. Beray
  - Representative: Eric Go Yap
  - Municipal Council: Members: Luis A. Acong; Marian D. Calawen; Miguel G. Cosalan Jr.; Pedro P. Anton; Gerardo E. Beray; Sonny E. Olas; Edward C. Albin; Alexander S. Piok
  - Electorate: 10,621 voters (2025)

Area
  - Total: 274.96 km^{2} (106.16 sq mi)
- Elevation: 1,274 m (4,180 ft)
- Highest elevation: 2,205 m (7,234 ft)
- Lowest elevation: 776 m (2,546 ft)

Population (2024 census)
  - Total: 16,071
  - Density: 58.449/km^{2} (151.38/sq mi)
  - Households: 3,429

Economy
  - Income class: 2nd municipal income class
  - Poverty incidence: 11.83% (2023)
  - Revenue: ₱ 195.9 million (2024)
  - Assets: ₱ 905.8 million (2024)
  - Expenditure: ₱ 220 million (2024)
  - Liabilities: ₱ 81.38 million (2024)

Service provider
  - Electricity: Benguet Electric Cooperative (BENECO)
- Time zone: UTC+8 (PST)
- ZIP code: 2605
- PSGC: 1401104000
- IDD : area code: +63 (0)74
- Native languages: Karaw; Kankanaey; Ibaloi; Kallahan; Ilocano; Tagalog
- Feast date: Christian

Bokod, officially the Municipality of Bokod, (Ilocano: Ili ti Bokod; Tagalog: Bayan ng Bokod), is a municipality in the province of Benguet, Philippines. According to the 2024 census, it has a population of 16,071 people.

== History ==
=== Pre-colonial and Spanish periods ===
According to folklore, Bokod, once a heavily forested village, got its name from a man named Ebokot (or Ekbot), who introduced agricultural development to the area. Ebokot's name was associated with the village and was registered as a pueblo during the Spanish Regime.

=== American period ===
Bokod was established as one of the 19 townships of Benguet during the American Rule with the enactment of Act No. 48 on November 22, 1900.

On August 13, 1908, Benguet was established as a sub-province of the newly created Mountain Province with the enactment of Act No. 1876. As a result, six townships of Benguet were abolished, among them were Ambuklao and Daclan which were integrated into the township of Bokod.

Executive Order No. 24 dated March 23, 1910, signed by William Cameron Forbes created the township of Bokod.

=== Post-war era ===
One of the principal infrastructure in Bokod is the Ambuklao Dam. Built in 1950 and opened in 1956, it is one of the most important hydroelectric facilities in Luzon.

On June 25, 1963, President Diosdado Macapagal issued Executive Order No. 42 converting eight of the 13 towns (designated as municipal districts) of Benguet sub-province into regular municipalities. Bokod was among them.

On June 18, 1966, the sub-province of Benguet was separated from the old Mountain Province and was converted into a regular province. Bokod remained to be a component municipality of the newly established province.

== Geography ==
The Municipality of Bokod is located at 16°29′29″N 120°49′48″E. It is bounded by Kabayan on the north-east, Atok on the north-west, Tublay on the mid-west, Itogon on the south-west, and Kayapa on the east.

According to the Philippine Statistics Authority, the municipality has a land area of 274.96 square kilometres (106.16 sq mi) constituting 9.93% of the 2,769.08-square-kilometre- (1,069.15 sq mi) total area of Benguet.

Bokod is situated 48.98 kilometres (30.43 mi) from the provincial capital La Trinidad, and 299.88 kilometres (186.34 mi) from the country's capital city of Manila.

=== Barangays ===
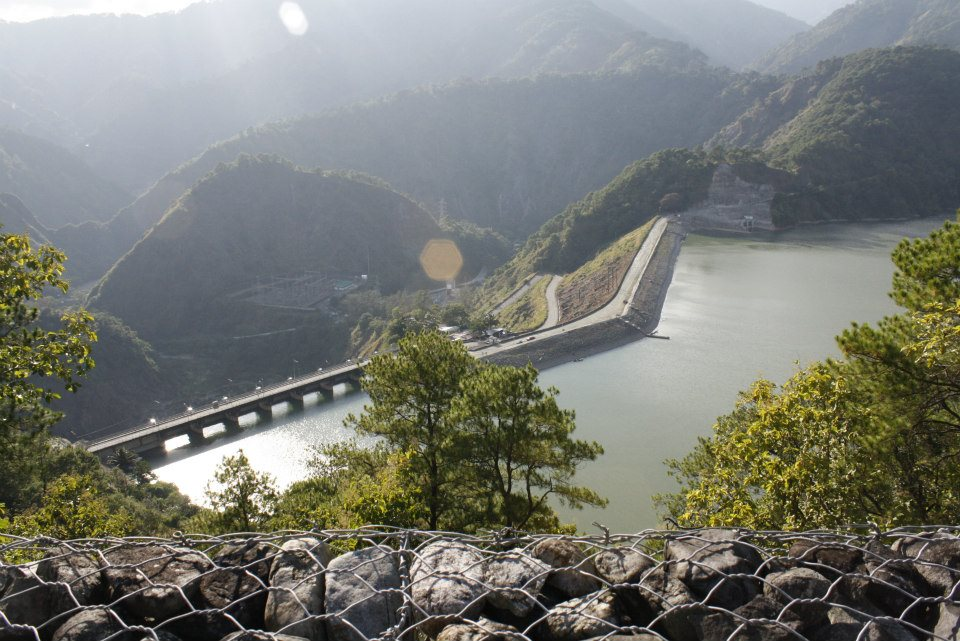
Ambuklao Dam

Bokod is politically subdivided into 10 barangays. Each barangay consists of puroks and some have sitios.

PSGC	Barangay	Population			±% p.a.	
		2024		2010		
141104001	Ambuklao	20.5%	3,301	3,013	▴	0.63%
141104002	Bila	9.2%	1,484	991	▴	2.82%
141104003	Bobok‑Bisal	7.8%	1,246	1,086	▴	0.95%
141104004	Daklan	10.9%	1,748	1,748	Steady	0.00%
141104005	Ekip	6.0%	962	806	▴	1.23%
141104006	Karao	6.9%	1,111	958	▴	1.03%
141104007	Nawal	3.8%	605	743	▾	−1.41%
141104008	Pito	6.6%	1,065	838	▴	1.67%
141104009	Poblacion	14.4%	2,314	1,964	▴	1.14%
141104010	Tikey	3.7%	599	501	▴	1.24%
	Total		16,071	14,435	▴	0.74%

=== Climate ===
Climate data for Bokod, Benguet
Month	Jan	Feb	Mar	Apr	May	Jun	Jul	Aug	Sep	Oct	Nov	Dec	Year
Mean daily maximum °C (°F)	23 (73)	24 (75)	26 (79)	27 (81)	27 (81)	26 (79)	25 (77)	24 (75)	25 (77)	25 (77)	25 (77)	23 (73)	25 (77)
Mean daily minimum °C (°F)	14 (57)	15 (59)	16 (61)	18 (64)	20 (68)	20 (68)	20 (68)	20 (68)	19 (66)	18 (64)	16 (61)	15 (59)	18 (64)
Average precipitation mm (inches)	21 (0.8)	28 (1.1)	34 (1.3)	58 (2.3)	160 (6.3)	179 (7.0)	226 (8.9)	225 (8.9)	215 (8.5)	168 (6.6)	59 (2.3)	32 (1.3)	1,405 (55.3)
Average rainy days	7.5	8.5	10.9	14.9	23.9	25.7	26.7	25.3	24.9	18.9	11.8	8.9	207.9
Source: Meteoblue

== Demographics ==
Population census of Bokod
Year	Pop.	±% p.a.
1903	31	—
1918	4,268	+38.86%
1939	6,082	+1.70%
1948	5,503	−1.11%
1960	8,946	+4.13%
1970	10,161	+1.28%
1975	10,404	+0.48%
1980	11,899	+2.72%
1990	11,474	−0.36%
1995	10,526	−1.60%
2000	11,705	+2.30%
2007	12,913	+1.36%
2010	12,648	−0.75%
2015	13,756	+1.61%
2020	14,435	+1.02%
2024	16,071	+2.61%
Source: Philippine Statistics Authority

In the 2024 census, Bokod had a population of 16,071 people. The population density was 58 inhabitants per square kilometre (150/sq mi).

== Economy ==
Poverty incidence of Bokod (%)

Source: Philippine Statistics Authority

The primary sources of agriculture in Bokod are vegetables, fruits, and cattle. Bokod is home to the Ambuklao Hydroelectric Plant that supplies power to the Luzon grid.

== Government ==
=== Local government ===
Bokod, belonging to the lone congressional district of the province of Benguet, is governed by a mayor designated as its local chief executive and by a municipal council as its legislative body in accordance with the Local Government Code. The mayor, vice mayor, and the councilors are elected directly by the people through an election which is being held every three years.

=== Elected officials ===
Members of the Municipal Council (2025-2028)
Position	Name
Congressman	Eric Go Yap
Mayor	Erik Donn Ignacio
Vice-Mayor	Doroteo S. Beray
Councilors	Luis A. Acong
Councilors	Marian D. Calawen
Councilors	Miguel G. Cosalan Jr.
Councilors	Pedro P. Anton
Councilors	Gerardo E. Beray
Councilors	Sonny E. Olas
Councilors	Edward C. Albin
Councilors	Alexander S. Piok

== Attractions ==
- Ambuklao Dam
- Mount Amalkatan
- Badekbek Sulfur Springs
- Palansa Panoramic View
- Bila Mountain Saddle
- Ekip Mossy Forest
- Palpalan Waterfalls
- Adwagan River
- Bobbok Second Growth Pine Forests
- Mount Pulag
- Mount Purgatory
- Mount Patoktok

== Education ==
The Bokod Schools District Office governs all educational institutions within the municipality. It oversees the management and operations of all private and public, from primary to secondary schools.

=== Public schools ===
As of 2014, Bokod has 37 public elementary schools and 3 public secondary schools.

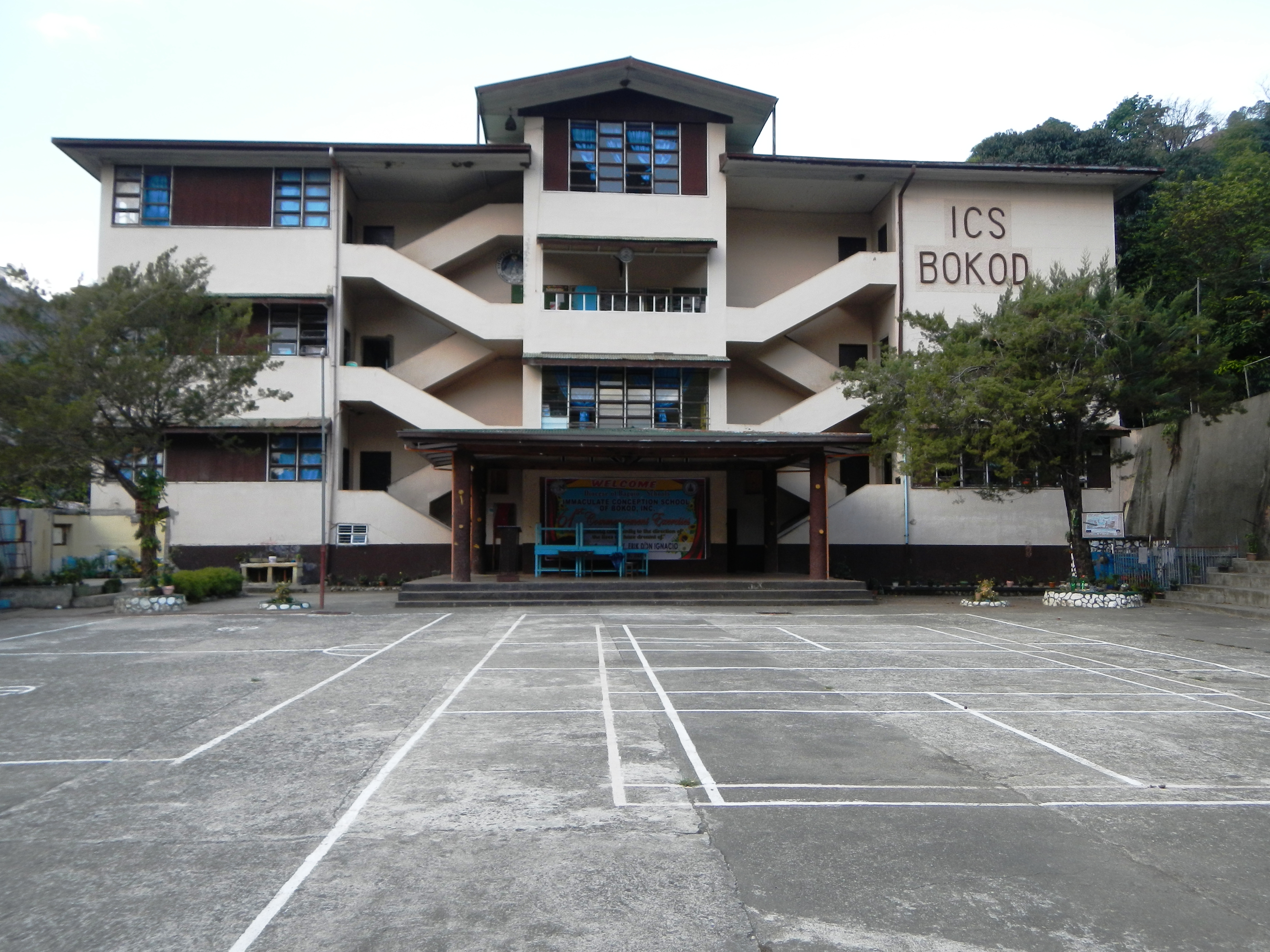
Immaculate Conception School of Bokod compound

Elementary (2013-2014)
School	Barangay
Adonot Primary School	Ambuklao
Akbot Alicnas Primary School	Pito
Alberto Cuilan Memorial School	Bila
Ambangeg Elementary School	Daklan
Ambayec Primary School	Poblacion
Ambuklao Elementary School	Ambuklao
Banao Elementary School	Ambuklao
Bangao Community School	Ambuklao
Bangen Elementary School	Ambuklao
Bantas Suanding Elementary School	Poblacion
Bawempeta Primary School	Nawal
Bila Elementary School	Bila
Bisal Elementary School	Bobok-Bisal
Bokod Central School	Poblacion
Bulo Elementary School	Poblacion
Bunagan Primary School	(Bunagan)
Camanggaan Elementary School	Tikey
Daklan Elementary School	Daklan
Ekip Elementary School	Ekip
Galsa Primary School	Pito
Karao Elementary School	Karao
Karao Tribe Primary School	Karao
Kawal Elementary School	Bobok-Bisal
Kiweng Primary School	Ambuklao
Lebeng Elementary School	Ambuklao
Liboong Primary School	Tikey
Line 10 Primary School - Palpalan	
Naswak Elementary School	Ekip
Nawal Elementary School	Nawal
Otbong Primary School	Bobok-Bisal
Palansa Elementary School	Bila
Pidile Primary School	Daklan
Pigingan-Diseb Primary School	Karao
Pilpiok Elementary School	Pito
Poodan Primary School	Ekip
Tikey Primary School	Tikey
Wakal Elementary School	Nawal

Secondary (2013-2014)
School	Barangay
Bokod National High School - Main	Pito
Bokod National High School - Daklan Extension	Daklan
Ambuklao National High School	Ambuklao

==== Universities ====
- Benguet State University Bokod Campus (BSAT) (Ambangeg)

=== Private schools ===
- Immaculate Conception School of Bokod, Inc. (Poblacion)

== Gallery ==
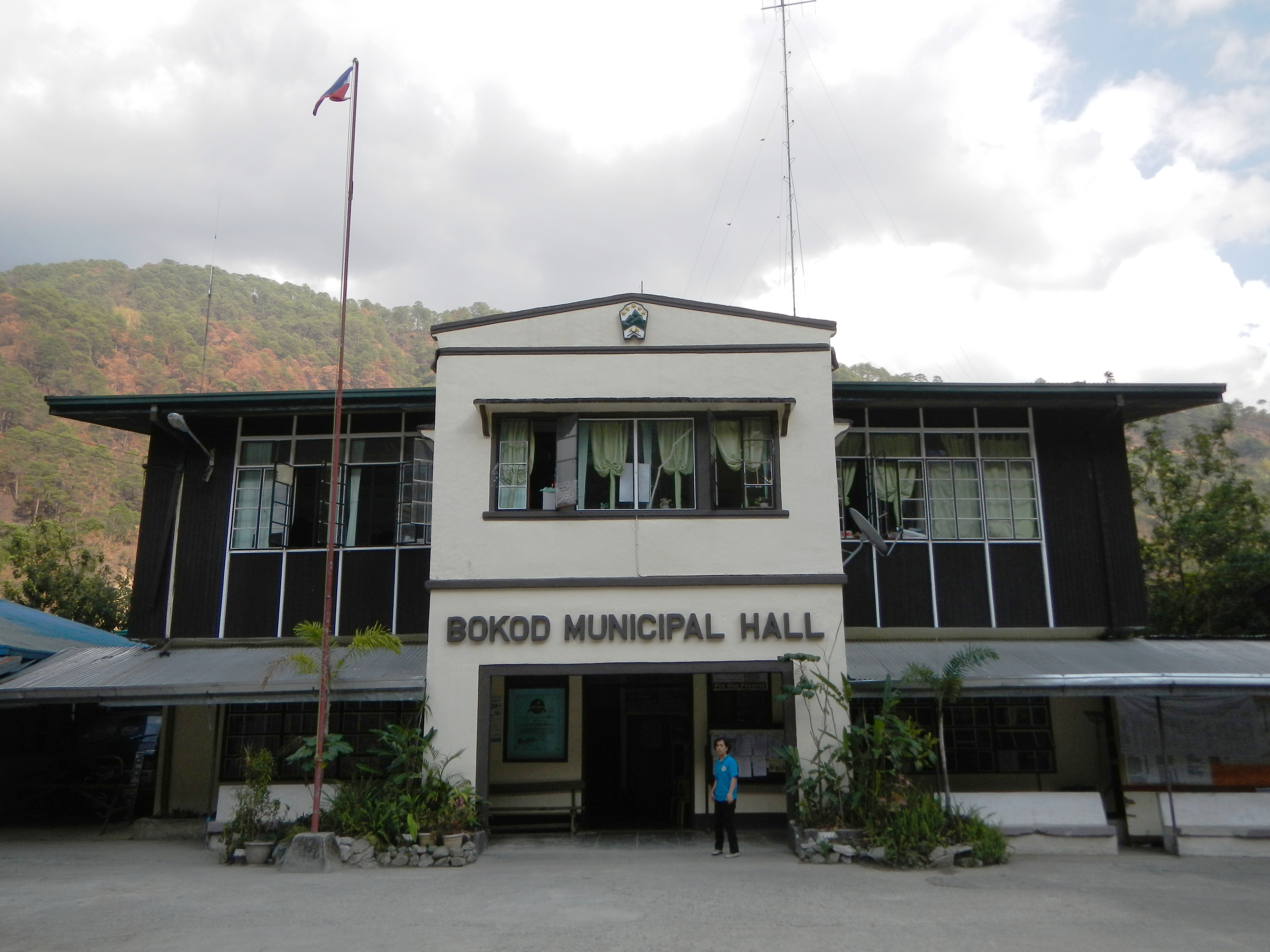
Municipal hall

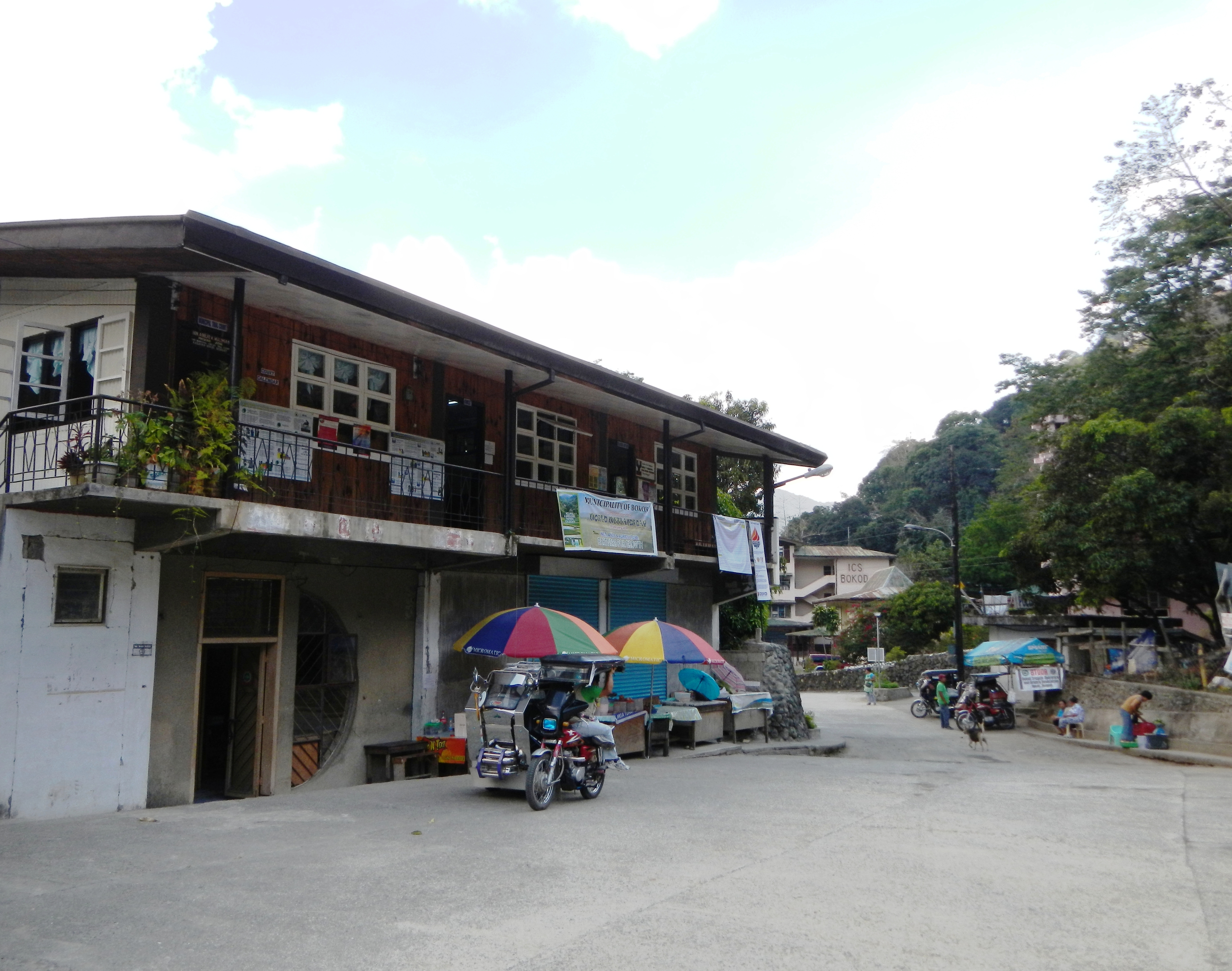
Downtown Bokod

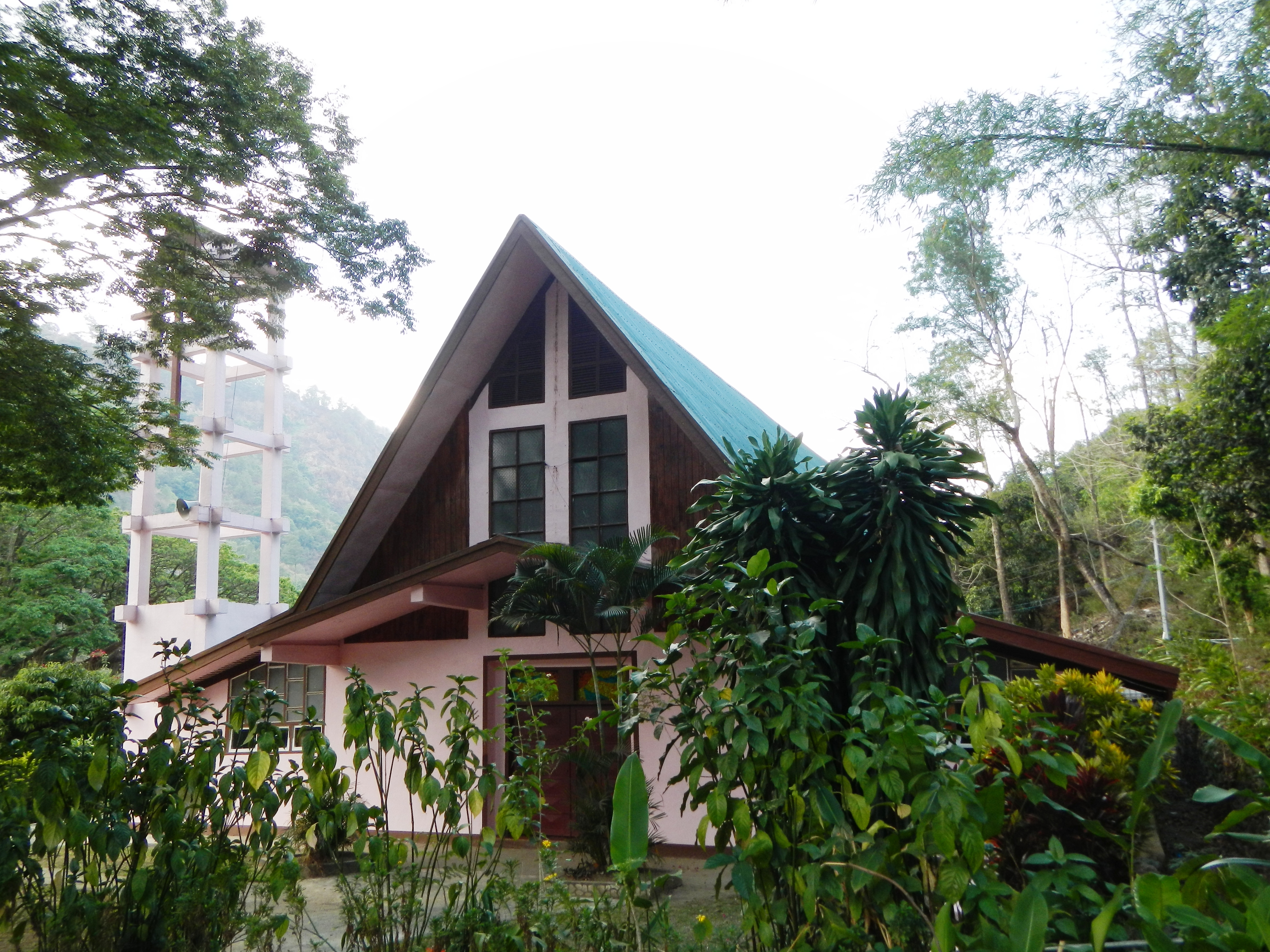
Immaculate Conception Parish Church

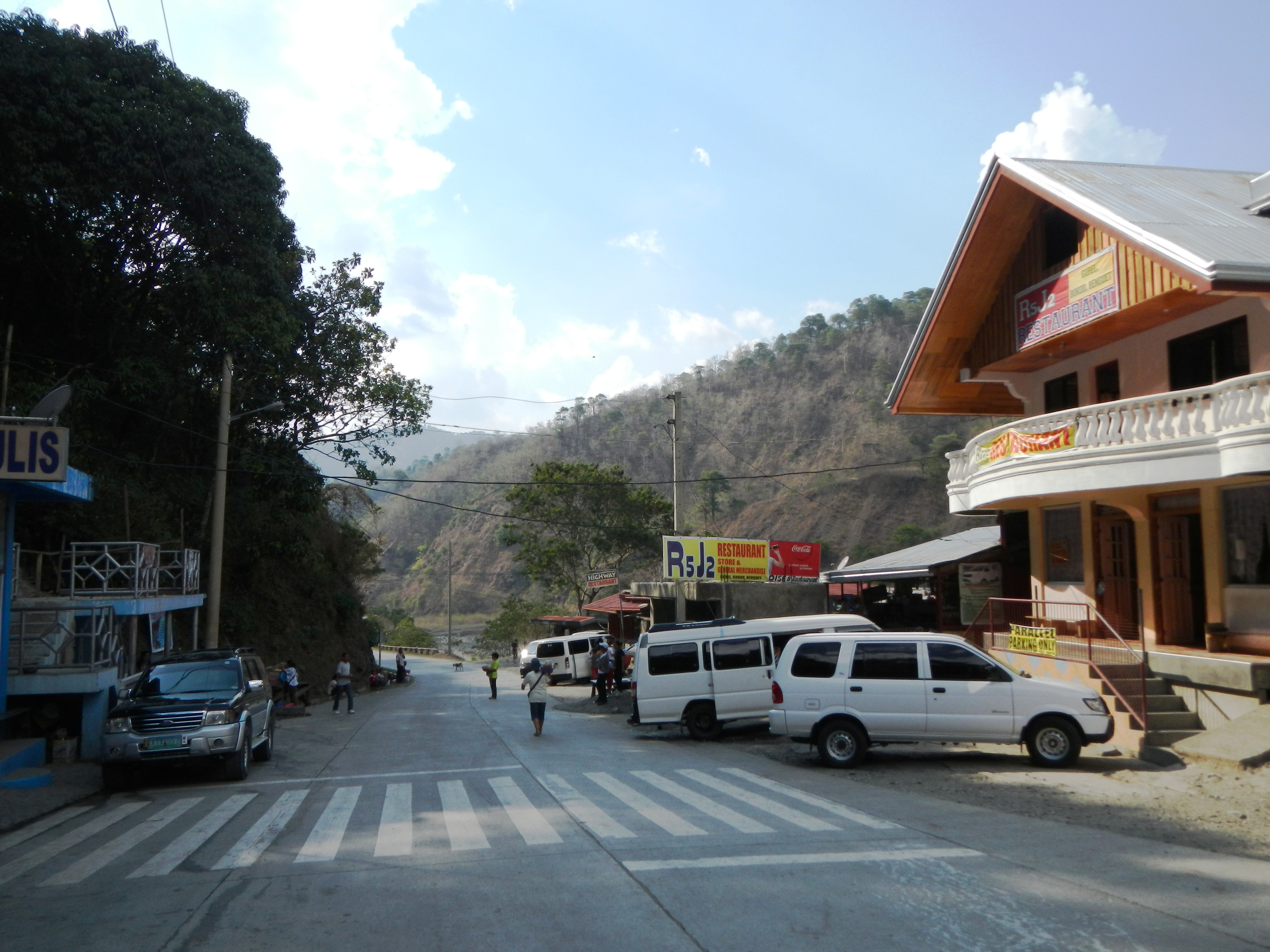
A road in town

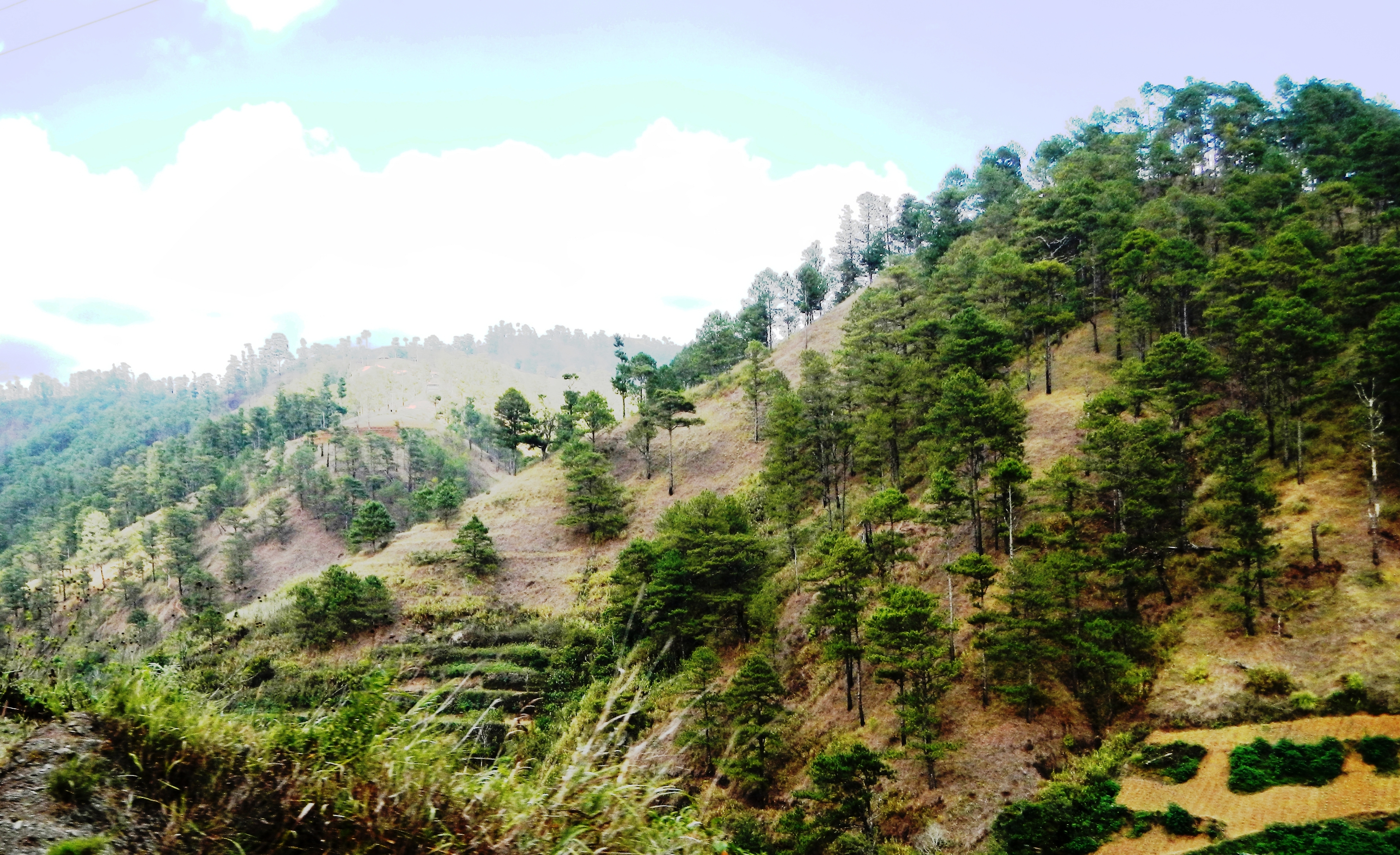
Pine forests in Bokod
