= Energy in the Philippines =

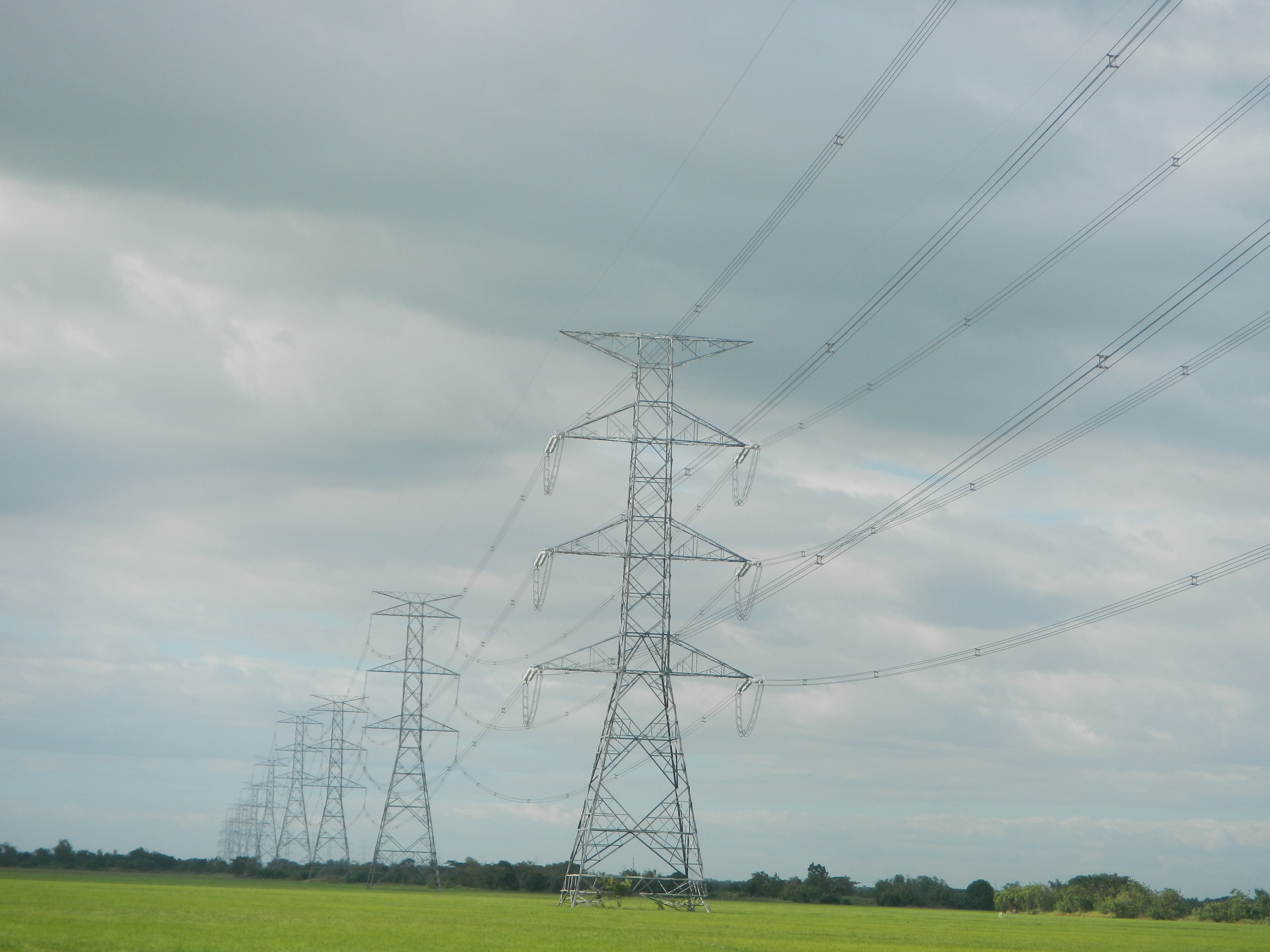
Transmission towers in San Miguel, Bulacan

Energy consumption by source, Philippines

The Philippines relies on a mix of fossil fuels and renewable resources for its energy needs. Electricity demand is driven by population growth, urbanisation and industry. Energy policy and planning are overseen by the Department of Energy. Usage patterns vary across Luzon, the Visayas and Mindanao, reflecting differences in generation assets, grid interconnections and local demand.

The population of the Philippines is over 101 million people, and as a rapidly developing nation, has seen a rapid increase in GDP, averaging 6.1% from 2011 to 2015. Energy-intensive manufacturing and retail industries are the driving factors of the Philippines' economic growth. Given its large population and rapidly growing economy, the country's energy needs are growing rapidly. According to the Philippines Department of Energy, the Philippines consumed 75,266 gigawatt-hours (GWh) of electricity in 2013. Of this, 27.39% went to powering residential areas, 24.31% to commercial establishments and 27.46% to the industrial sector. With 72.84% of electrical energy being consumed by Luzon, 14.75% by Visayas, and 12.41% by Mindanao in 2013.

== Electricity ==
Percentage of electricity used by major islands
1. Luzon (72.8%)
2. Visayas (14.8%)
3. Mindanao (12.4%)
Percentage of electricity used by different sectors
1. Commercial (24.3%)
2. Industrial (27.5%)
3. Residential (27.4%)
4. Other (20.8%)

The Philippines’ demand for electrical energy in 2013 represents a 42.17% increase from 2012, when the demand for energy was at 52,941 GWh.

The Philippines’ current energy mix highly favors fossil fuels, with coal, natural gas, and oil, accounting for 73.56% of the country's total electrical energy needs, primarily due to their low cost.

Coal is a major fuel in the country’s power mix. In 2013, 32,081 GWh—about 42.62% of the Philippines’ 75,266 GWh electricity demand—came from coal. As of March 2016, there were 32 coal-fired generation facilities connected to the grid, listed by the Department of Energy for Luzon, the Visayas and Mindanao. These plants are spread across the country, with many in Luzon and the Visayas. A 2016 report noted plans for about 25 additional coal-fired plants by 2030 to meet projected demand. By 2019, coal supplied roughly half of electricity generation, and in 2020 the government said it would follow a mixed energy strategy and announced a ban on new coal power plants.

Besides coal, the Philippines relies on natural gas. The Philippines produced 18,791 GWh of electricity from natural gas in 2013. This corresponded to 24.97% of the Philippines’ electrical energy needs during this period. As of March 2016, there were a total of 13 natural gas generation facilities connected to the energy grid, 12 of which are in Luzon and one of which is in Cebu on Visayas.

The Philippines also generates a significant amount of electrical energy from oil, albeit to a lesser degree than compared to coal and natural gas. In 2013, the Philippines sourced 5.97% of its energy from oil-based sources. As of March 2016, there were a total of 212 gas and diesel-powered facilities in the Philippines. The large number of oil-powered power plants is a result of a lower per plant output compared to coal and natural gas. Oil-powered power plants can be found dispersed across several provinces in Luzon, Visayas, and Mindanao.

Since 1998, the Leyte–Luzon HVDC interconnection has allowed transfer of surplus power from Visayas geothermal fields to Luzon. In July 2023, the Mindanao–Visayas Interconnection Project (MVIP) began operation, linking the three main island grids. These interconnections enable sharing of surplus electricity and provide contingency support when one island experiences shortfalls. The Leyte–Luzon 350 kV HVDC scheme has a transfer capability of up to 440 MW; upgrading the existing monopole to a bipole is planned to increase capacity, with full sharing targeted for 2035.

== Renewable energy ==
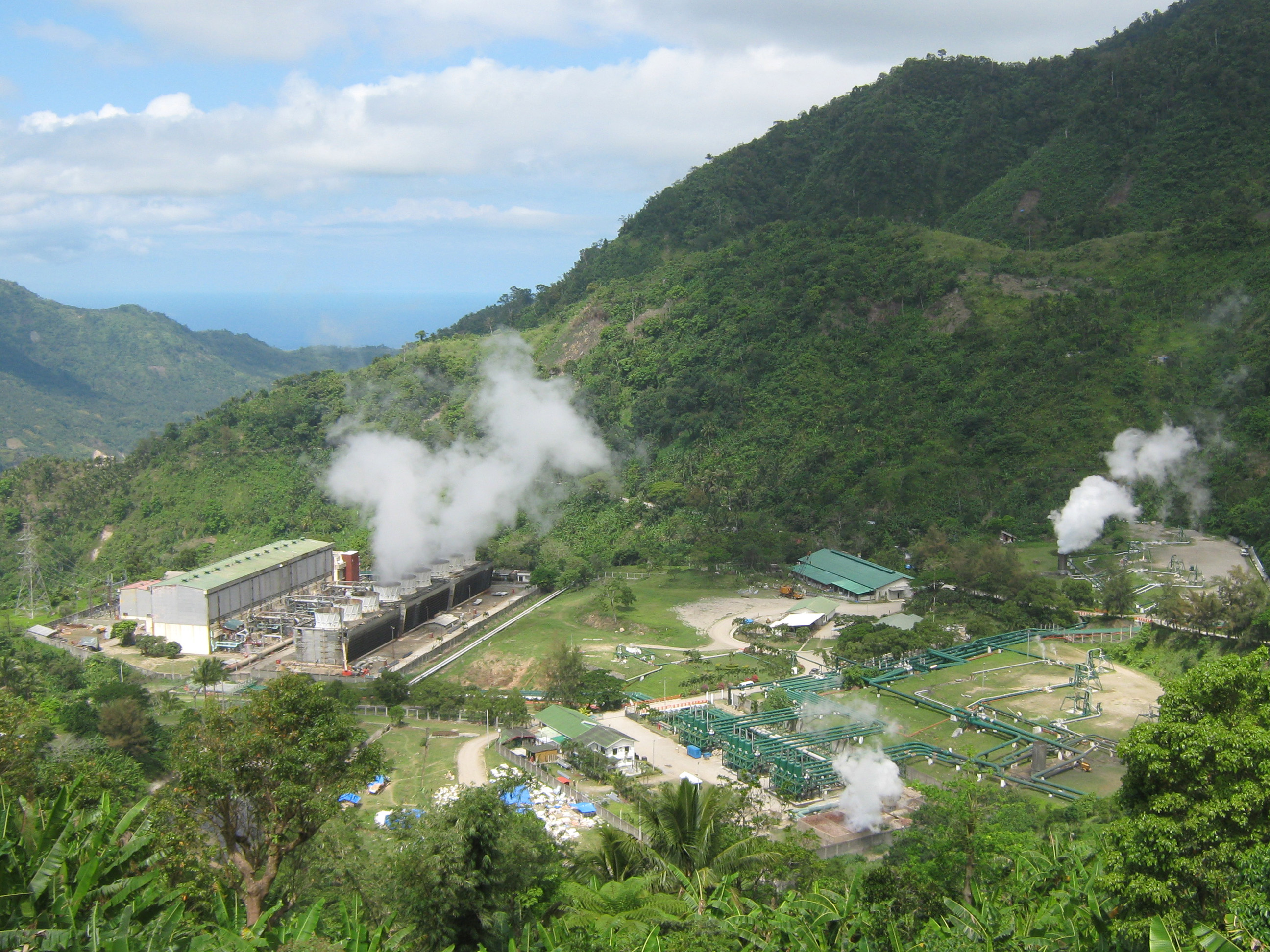
Palinpinon Geothermal power plant in Negros Oriental

The Government of the Philippines has introduced various policies to foster renewable energy. Some of the policies provide an income tax holiday up to seven years, duty-free import of equipment for renewable energy technologies, etc. In 2012, the government launched the new feed-in tariff (FIT).

== Regulatory bodies ==
In 2019, the Philippine government enacted the Energy Efficiency and Conservation Act (Republic Act No. 11285), which institutionalized policies on energy efficiency and conservation nationwide. The law designates the Department of Energy (DOE) as the lead implementing agency responsible for planning, development, enforcement, and monitoring of energy efficiency and conservation programs, including the formulation of the National Energy Efficiency and Conservation Plan and the setting of minimum energy performance standards. It also establishes an Inter‑Agency Energy Efficiency and Conservation Committee (IAEECC) to coordinate government energy efficiency projects and strategic direction. Under the Act, multiple government agencies and local government units are assigned roles to promote energy efficiency in their respective sectors and functions, reinforcing the regulatory framework for energy use in the Philippines. The Philippines passed the Philippine National Nuclear Energy Safety Act on 18 September 2025, creating an independent regulatory body to oversee all sources of ionizing radiation and support potential nuclear power programs.

== See also ==
- Environmental issues in the Philippines
- Climate change in the Philippines
