= Binalonan =

Municipality in Pangasinan, Philippines

- Municipality
- Municipality of Binalonan
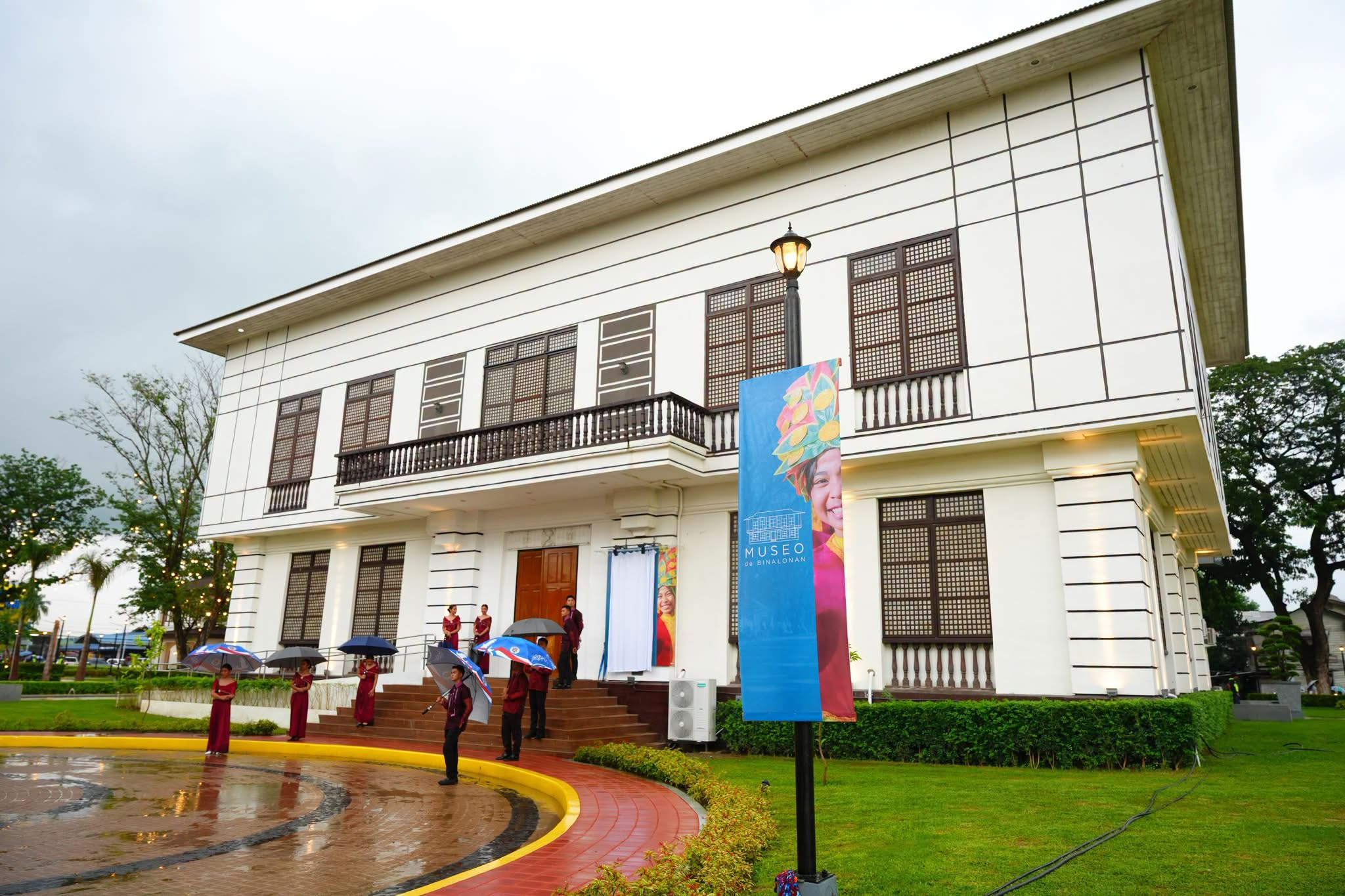
- Museo de Binalonan

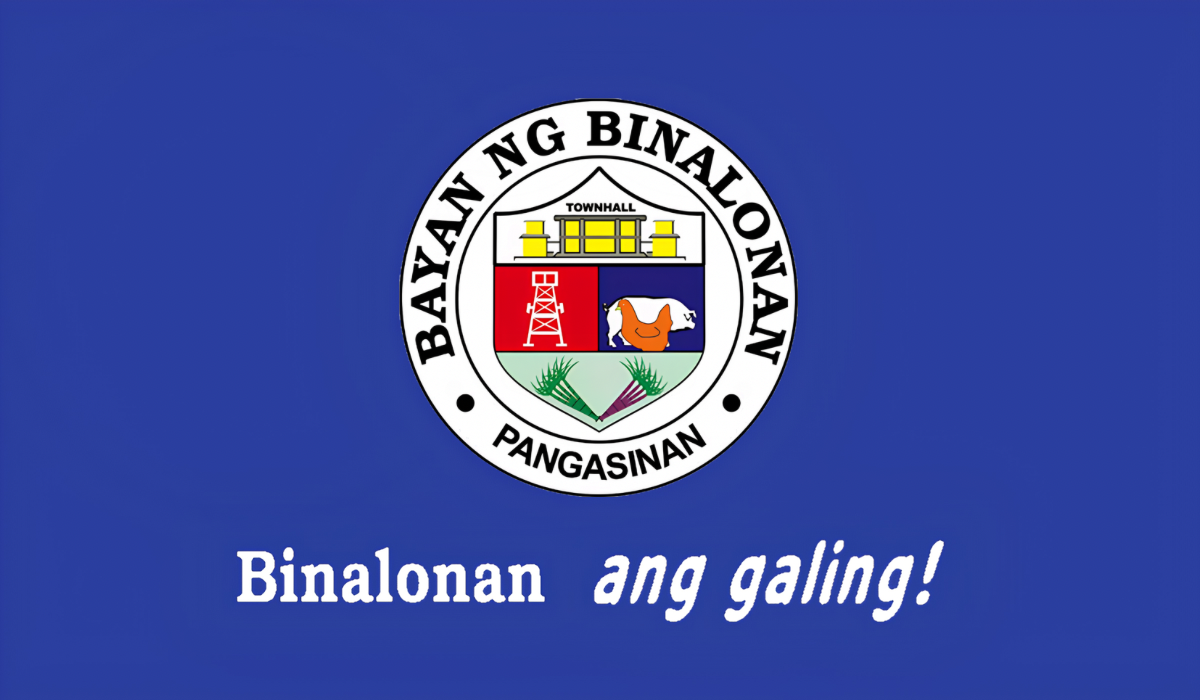
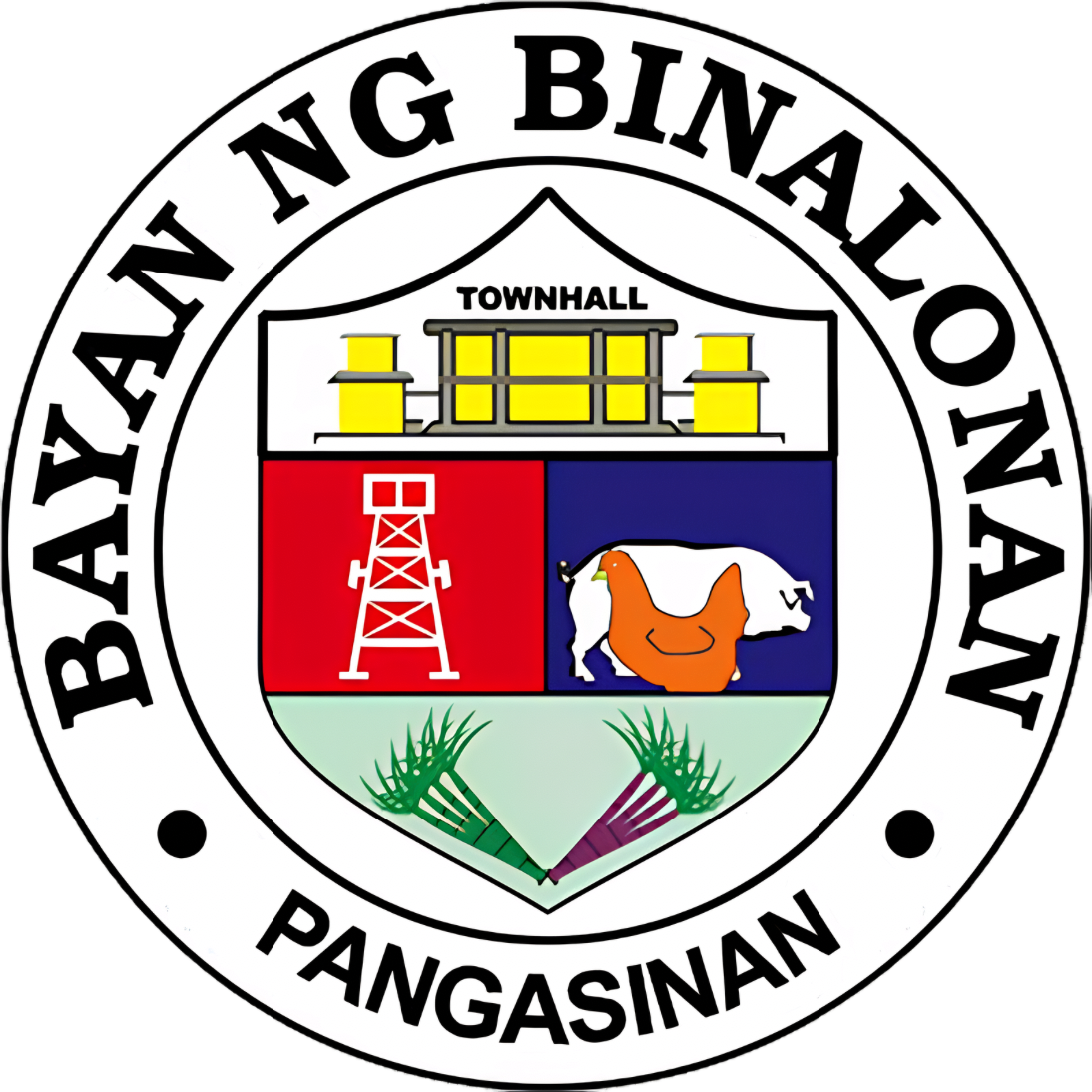
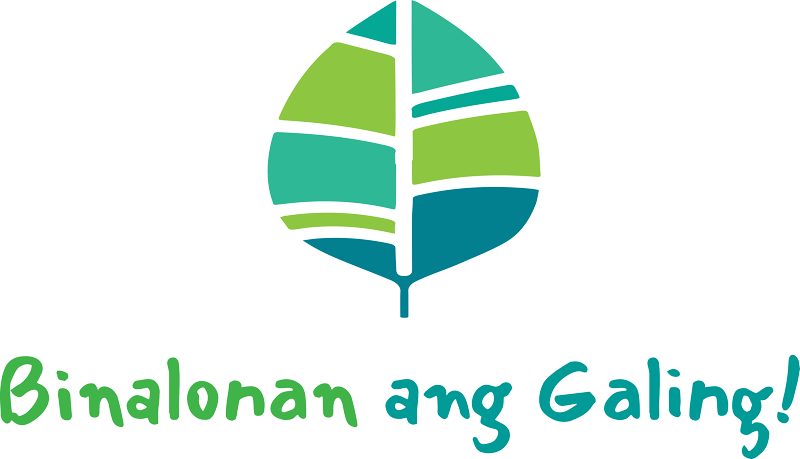
- Flag Seal Wordmark
- Etymology: Bin-na-lon-an, lit. “where prepared food to take along is given”
- Motto: Binalonan ang Galing!
- Anthem: Binalonan Hymn (Binalonan ang Galing!)
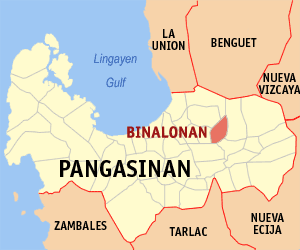
- Map of Pangasinan with Binalonan highlighted
- Interactive map of Binalonan
- Location within the Philippines
- Coordinates: 16°03′N 120°36′E
- Country: Philippines
- Region: Ilocos Region
- Province: Pangasinan
- District: 5th district
- Founded: February 18, 1872
- Barangays: 24 (see Barangays)

Government
  - Type: Sangguniang Bayan
  - Mayor: Ramon Ronald V. Guico IV
  - Vice Mayor: Bryan Louie Ramirez Balangue
  - Representative: Ramon Guico Jr.
  - Municipal Council: Members: William U. Aradanas; Renato E. Legaspi; Glory Jovelyn G. Manaois; Brenda G. Paderes; Carl Joseph A. Patawaran; Juan Z. Delos Santos; Arturo V. Romua; Marie Ann R. Baybayan
  - Electorate: 38,564 voters (2025)

Area
  - Total: 47.57 km^{2} (18.37 sq mi)
- Elevation: 40 m (130 ft)
- Highest elevation: 149 m (489 ft)
- Lowest elevation: 23 m (75 ft)

Population (2024 census)
  - Total: 56,560
  - Density: 1,189/km^{2} (3,079/sq mi)
  - Households: 14,457

Economy
  - Income class: 1st municipal income class
  - Poverty incidence: 10.25% (2023)
  - Revenue: ₱ 532.5 million (2024)
  - Assets: ₱ 1,693 million (2024)
  - Expenditure: ₱ 298.3 million (2024)
  - Liabilities: ₱ 382.7 million (2024)

Service provider
  - Electricity: Pangasinan 3 Electric Cooperative (PANELCO 3)
- Time zone: UTC+8 (PST)
- ZIP code: 2436
- PSGC: 0105512000
- IDD : area code: +63 (0)75
- Native languages: Pangasinan; Ilocano; Tagalog
- Website: www.binalonan.gov.ph

Binalonan, officially the Municipality of Binalonan (Pangasinan: Baley na Binalonan; Ilocano: Ili ti Binalonan; Tagalog: Bayan ng Binalonan), is a municipality in the province of Pangasinan, Philippines. According to the 2024 census, it has a population of 56,560 people.

One of Binalonan's natives is the Filipino-American writer Carlos Bulosan, who wrote brief descriptions of the town's history and people in his semi-autobiographical novel entitled America Is in the Heart. The town has a memorial and street named after him just north of the municipal hall and town market.

It is also the hometown of Evangelina Guico Macaraeg Macapagal, spouse of 9th President Diosdado Macapagal, and mother of 14th President Gloria Macapagal Arroyo.

== History ==
According to historians, the town's name is an evolution of the Pangasinense term balon, which means "packed lunch"; or in Tagalog, baon.

In a traditional story which now plays an important role in the town's history, the area was originally owned by a Spaniard named Don Salvador. It was told that he instructed his men to put up crude wooden fences along the property to establish his ownership. During the course of their work, Don Salvador's men used to have their lunch and rest under Camachile trees located in the center of the land mainly due to its breezy shades.

Don Salvador offered his pastureland to several immigrants from Ilocos. When they asked Don Salvador how they were going to find the said land, the owner answered: "It is the place where people bring their balon to eat". Hence the term Binnalonan, which in Ilocano and Pangasinan means "a place where people bring and eat their baon", was born. At present, the town is called Binalonan while its people are known as Binalonians.

In 1838, Ilocano herdsmen and laborers constituted the first town in San Felipe. Later on, this was transferred to Santa Catalina, then returned to its previous site where the town still stands to this day. The town was the site of a World War II battle during the Japanese invasion of the Philippines.

== Geography ==
The Municipality of Binalonan is located in the eastern part of the province of Pangasinan. The Municipality is bordered on the north by the municipalities of Pozorrubio and Sison, on the south by Urdaneta, on the east by San Manuel and Asingan and on the west by Laoac.

Binalonan is situated 51.27 kilometres (31.86 mi) from the provincial capital Lingayen, and 190.80 kilometres (118.56 mi) from the country's capital city of Manila.

=== Barangays ===
Binalonan is subdivided into 24 barangays. Each barangay consists of puroks and some have sitios.

- Balangobong
- Bued
- Bugayong
- Camangaan
- Canarvacanan
- Capas
- Cili
- Dumayat
- Linmansangan
- Mangcasuy
- Moreno
- Pasileng Norte
- Pasileng Sur
- Poblacion
- San Felipe Central
- San Felipe Sur
- San Pablo
- Sta. Catalina
- Sta. Maria Norte
- Santiago
- Sto. Niño
- Sumabnit
- Tabuyoc
- Vacante

=== Climate ===
Climate data for Binalonan, Pangasinan
Month	Jan	Feb	Mar	Apr	May	Jun	Jul	Aug	Sep	Oct	Nov	Dec	Year
Mean daily maximum °C (°F)	31 (88)	31 (88)	32 (90)	34 (93)	35 (95)	34 (93)	32 (90)	32 (90)	32 (90)	32 (90)	32 (90)	31 (88)	32 (90)
Mean daily minimum °C (°F)	22 (72)	22 (72)	22 (72)	24 (75)	24 (75)	24 (75)	24 (75)	24 (75)	24 (75)	23 (73)	23 (73)	22 (72)	23 (74)
Average precipitation mm (inches)	13.6 (0.54)	10.4 (0.41)	18.2 (0.72)	15.7 (0.62)	178.4 (7.02)	227.9 (8.97)	368 (14.5)	306.6 (12.07)	310.6 (12.23)	215.7 (8.49)	70.3 (2.77)	31.1 (1.22)	1,766.5 (69.56)
Average rainy days	3	2	2	4	14	16	23	21	24	15	10	6	140
Source: World Weather Online

=== Land classification ===
The municipality's total land area, estimated at 8,400 hectares (84 km^{2}), is classified as alienable and disposable land.

=== Rivers ===
Binalonan has two major rivers:

- Aloragat River
- Tagamusing River

It also has minor rivers, including the San Pablo Creek, Tuboy River, Palma Creek, the Camambogan Creek and Balisa Creek.

=== Soil type ===
There are five types of soil which can be found in Binalonan: the San Manuel fine sandy loam, San Manuel loam, San Manuel sandy loam, San Manuel clay, and Umingan sandy loam.

== Demographics ==
Population census of Binalonan

Year	Pop.	±% p.a.
1903	14,603	—
1918	17,392	+1.17%
1939	19,736	+0.60%
1948	23,361	+1.89%
1960	25,651	+0.78%
1970	32,441	+2.37%
1975	34,726	+1.37%
1980	35,574	+0.48%

Year	Pop.	±% p.a.
1990	43,839	+2.11%
1995	44,490	+0.28%
2000	48,967	+2.08%
2007	52,722	+1.02%
2010	52,832	+0.08%
2015	54,555	+0.61%
2020	56,382	+0.70%
2024	56,560	+0.08%

Source: Philippine Statistics Authority

The urban population is recorded at 7,634 while the rural population is at 45,088. The urban-rural population ratio is estimated at 15/100. The male-to-female ratio is 1.029.

=== Religion ===
Roman Catholic, Iglesia Ni Cristo (3 locale chapels at Binalonan Crossing, at San Felipe Central, Sitio Riverside at Brgy. Sumabnit, one at Moreno, San Pablo and Sto.Nino), Aglipayan Church, and Other Protestant denominations.

== Economy ==
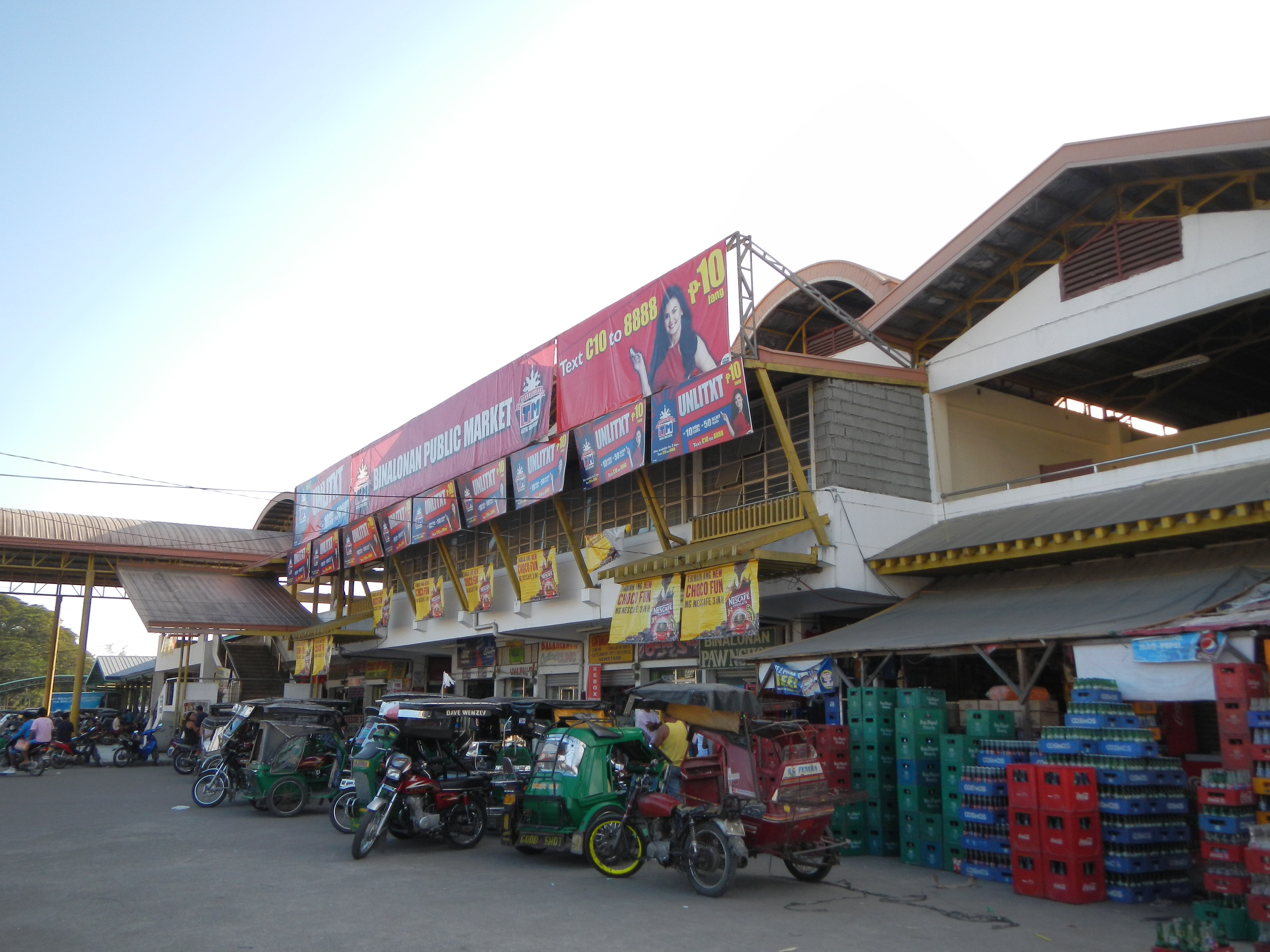
Public Market

Poverty incidence of Binalonan (%)

Source: Philippine Statistics Authority

== Government ==
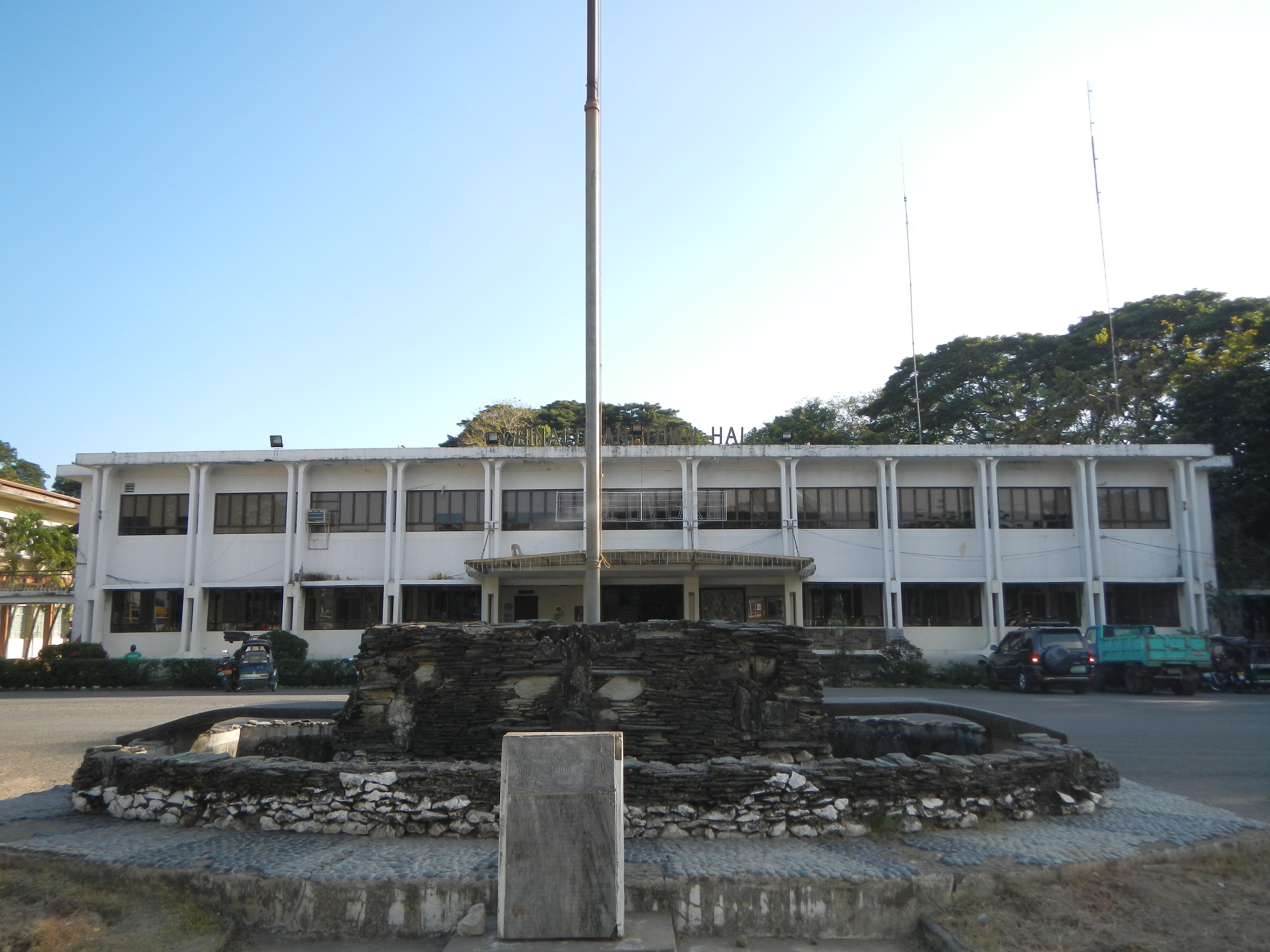
Binalonan Town Hall

=== Local government ===
Binalonan, belonging to the fifth congressional district of the province of Pangasinan, is governed by a mayor designated as its local chief executive and by a municipal council as its legislative body in accordance with the Local Government Code. The mayor, vice mayor, and the councilors are elected directly by the people through an election which is being held every three years.

=== Municipal seal ===
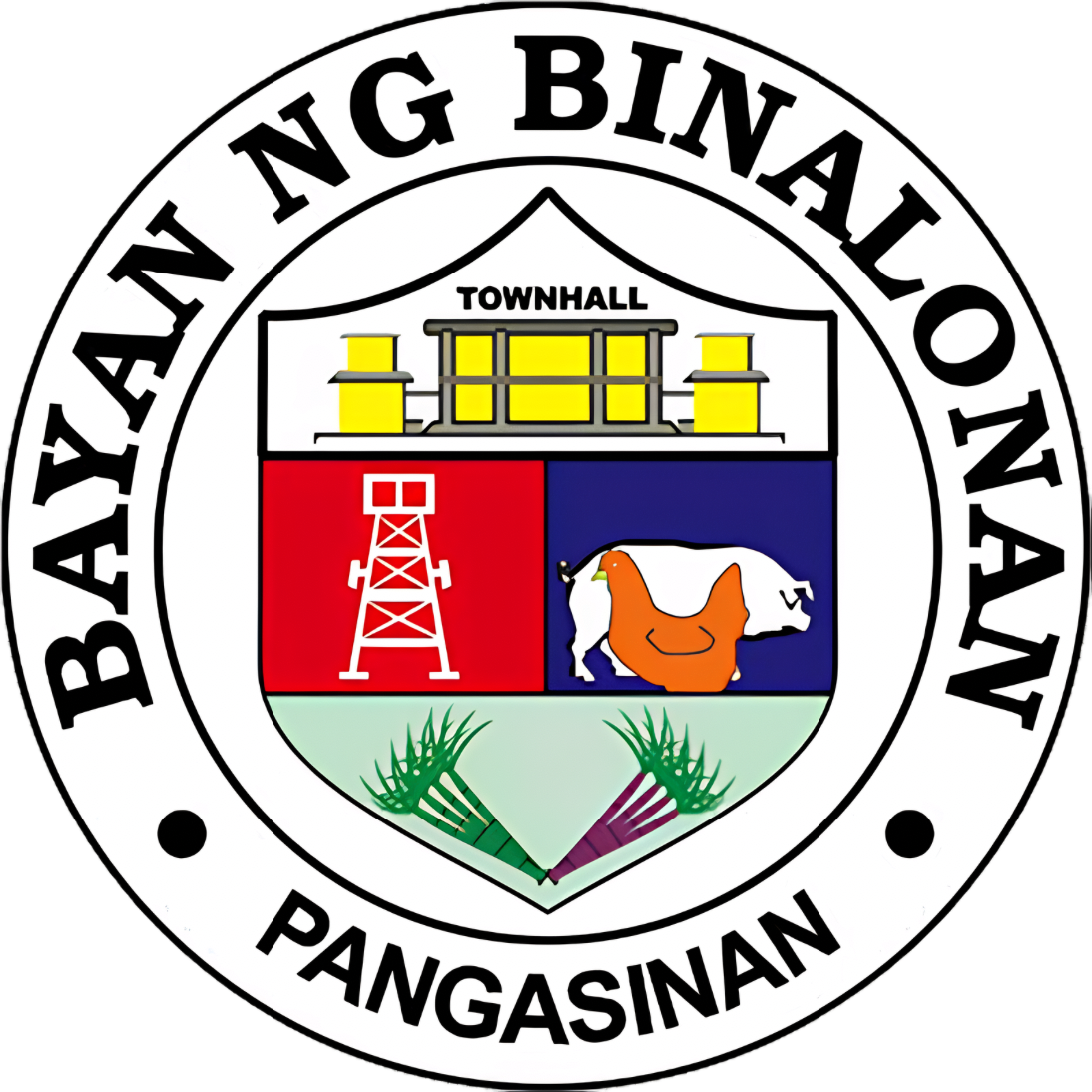
The Binalonan Municipal Seal

The topmost structure depicted on the municipal seal is an image of the municipality's Municipal Hall. Below it on the left is a depiction of the antenna of Digital Communications, the center of communications for Regions I, II and CAR.

Beside the antenna is a representation of a subsidiary source of income in Binalonan: the raising of chickens and hogs. At the bottom, the left image is that of rice stalks, the municipality's main product. Beside it is the picture of a sugar cane, which is the main ingredient for Binalonan's top products — basi, suka and muskuvado (brown sugar). The shield encasing these images means that Binalonan is under the province of Pangasinan.

=== Elected officials ===
Members of the Municipal Council (2025-Present):

- Congressman: Ramon N. Guico Jr.
- Mayor: Ramon Ronald V. Guico IV
- Vice-Mayor: Bryan Louie R. Balangue
- Councilors:
  - William U. Aradanas
  - Renato E. Legaspi
  - Glory Jovelyn G. Manaois
  - Brenda G. Paderes
  - Carl Joseph A. Patawaran
  - Juan Z. Delos Santos
  - Arturo V. Romua
  - Marie Ann R. Baybayan

== Culture ==
Binalonan figures prominently in the novel America is in the Heart by Filipino-American writer Carlos Bulosan, who was born in Binalonan. The first part of the semi-autobiographical novel features the struggles of Allos, the novel's main character, as he grows up as the son of a peasant farmer in Binalonan. The town has a memorial and street named after Bulosan just north of the municipal hall and town market.

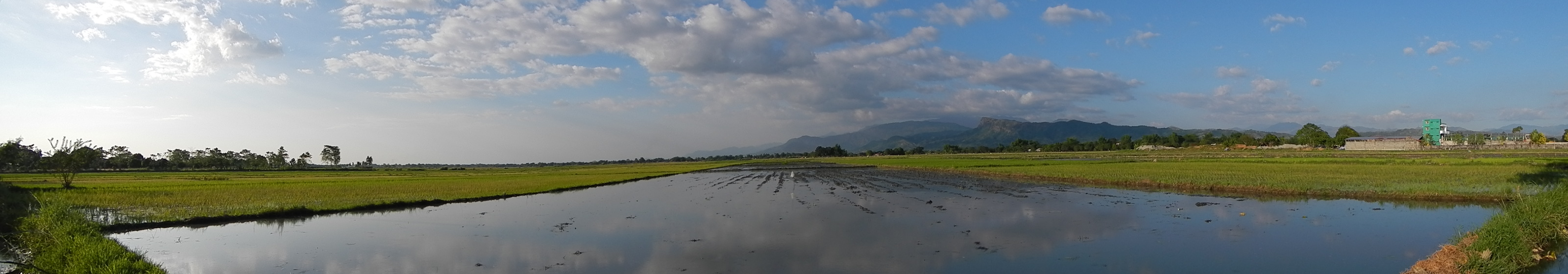

== Tourism ==
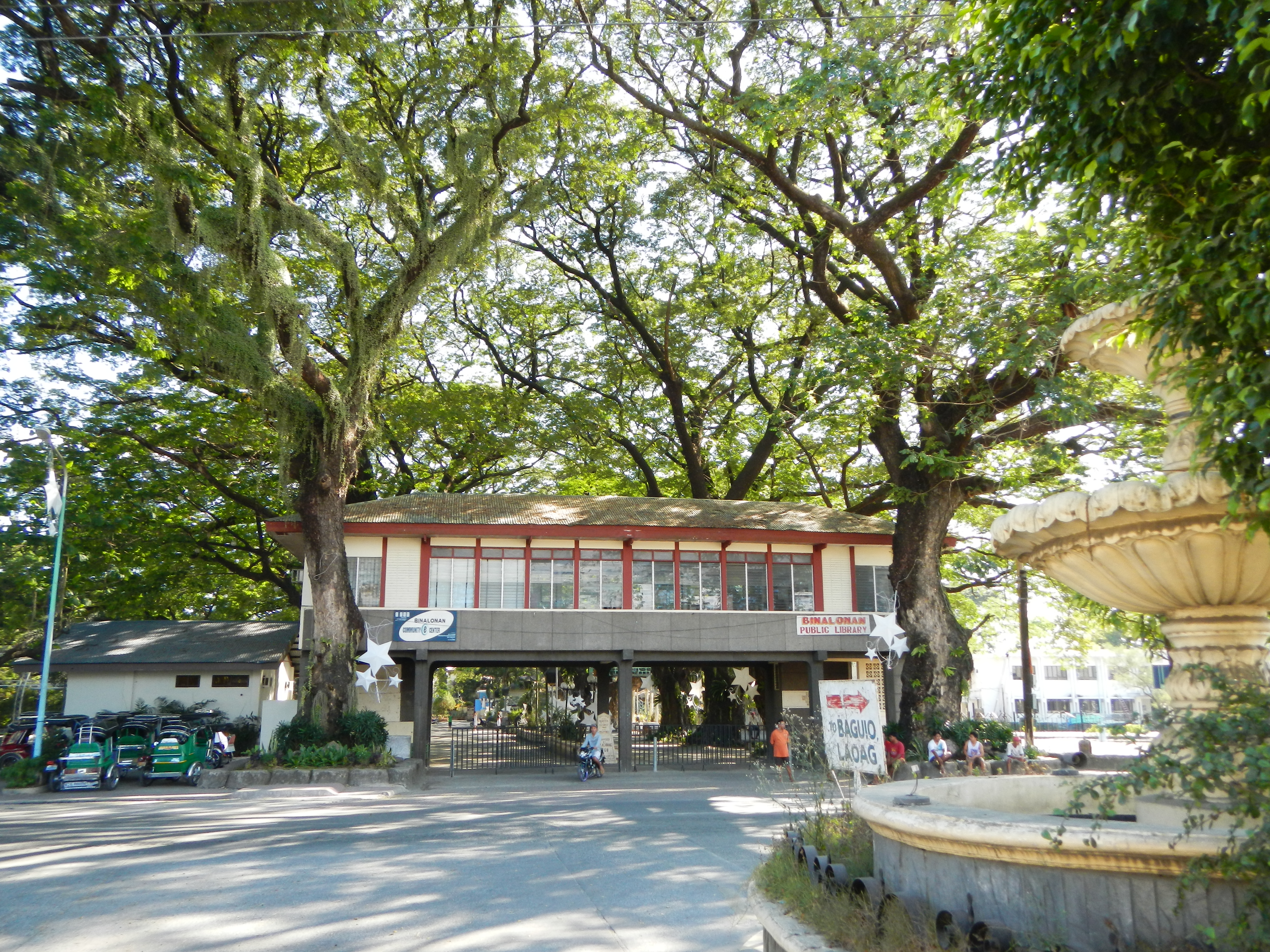
Most beautiful Park, 1968

Binalonan Rock Garden defines the town with century-old acacia trees guarding the walking pavements, benches, Balikbayan Hall, basketball court and the pathway towards the historic Santo Niño Parish Church.

The town's interesting points include:

- The Santo Niño Parish Church is the town's landmark and Spanish colonial architectural legacy
- Mount Paldingan Stations of the Cross in Barangay Santa Catalina
- The town has a central transport terminal, a Bagsakan Center (wholesale trade) library and community eCenter
- The New Market Shed and Food Terminal were opened on 27 September 2012
- The Binalonan Airfield and Binalonan airport
- Balon-Balon Festival and Fiesta
- Rupertos Inland Resort
- Balangobong field
- Binalonan Fiesta - vibrant festival with various activities and street performers

=== Parish of the Holy Child Church ===
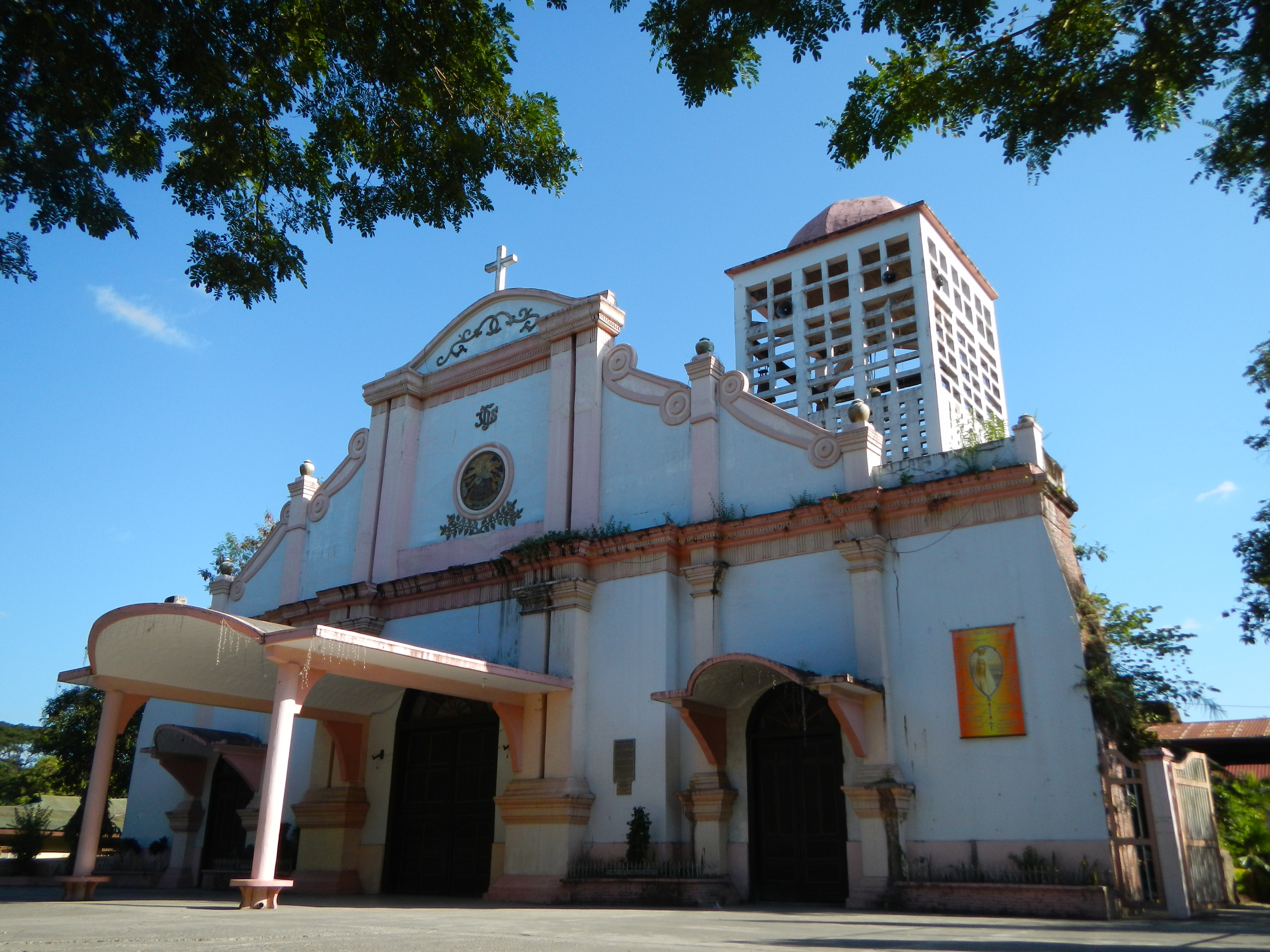
1841 Parish of the Holy Child Church

The 1841 (19th century architecture) Santo Niño Parish Church, in under the jurisdiction of the Roman Catholic Archdiocese of Lingayen-Dagupan, Roman Catholic Diocese of Urdaneta. Its Feast Day is 3rd Sunday of January, with Parish Priest, Father Elisar Christopher M. Itchon and Parochial Vicar, Father Jun G. Laya and Vicar Forane, Father Elpidio F. Silva Jr.

Fr. Julian Izaga founded San Felipe, the origin of the Church and town freed from Manaoag since 1834, and moved to Santa Catalina, where he built church and a convent of light materials. Fr. Ramon Fernandez transferred the town in 1938 to the present site..

The Dominicans founded Binalonan Parish in 1841, under Kura Paroko, Fr. Domingo Llue and then, by Fr,. Policarpio Illana who began construction of the Church in 1842.

Fr. Antonio Vinelas erected in 1855 a bigger church, with Fr. Ruperto Alarcon's construction in 1861. Fr. Juan Fernandez (1861-1865) built a provisional church. In 1866–1873, Fr. Felix Cantador added old convent walls, while Fr. P.del Campo finished the Church. In 1879,

The October 19, 1881 typhoon destroyed the 1879 Church. Father Silvestre Fernandez added the 3 naves rehabilitation due to the earthquake of 1882. The Church was placed under the ecclesiastical jurisdiction of El Santisimo Nombre de Jesus. In the Hispano-American War the church was destroyed.

After the 1898 Revolution, Fr. Mariano Pacis became the Pastor of Manaoag and Binalonan, but it was Fr. Pio Mabutas who finished the Church in 1930. The Japanese destroyed the Church except the miraculous image of Santo Niño.

Fr. Pablo Evangelista rehabilitated the Church in 1946 and Fr. Leon Bitanga reconstructed in until 1961, founding the Holy Child Academy.

It was only on January 30, 2008, that the Church's marker was imposed upon generous donations of New York and New Jersey Binalonans (Joey and Remy Castelo-Sellona and Drs. Jose and Violy Quintos. (Source: Church marker, 2008).

== Infrastructure ==
=== Healthcare ===
- Hospitals:
- Rural Health Unit/Centers: 8
- Barangay Health Stations: 24
- Malnutrition Rate: 9.06%
- Severely Underweight: 1.17%
- Moderately Underweight: 7.88%
- No. of Day Care Workers: 29
- No. of Day Care Centers: 29
- No. of Day Care Children: 544
- Contraceptive Prevalence Rate: 51%

=== Sanitation ===
Surveys show that 8,238 homes in Binalonan have water-sealed sewer/septic tank toilets which are used exclusively by members of the household.

Garbage is disposed of through burning.

== Education ==
There are two Schools District Office which govern all educational institutions within the municipality. They oversee the management and operations of all private and public elementary and high schools. These are Binalonan I Schools District Office, and Binalonan II Schools District Office.

	Elementary	Secondary
Number of schools
Government	22	6
Private	6	2
Total enrollment
Government	7,376	3,729
Private	919	113
Number of teachers	287	169
Number of classrooms	295	109

Other education centers include the WCC Aeronautical and Technological College (World Citi Colleges, (WCC) Aviation Company), an expansive facility which contains the Binalonan Airfield), St. Michael de Archangel College, University of Eastern Pangasinan, Manantan Technical School, Holy Child Academy parochial school and Juan G. Macaraeg National High School.

=== University of Eastern Pangasinan ===
It all started in 2005 when the University of Eastern Pangasinan was formally established in the municipality. At first, its existence was only a dissertation paper presented by Dr. Ramon V. Guico III to President Gloria Macapagal Arroyo, Speaker Jose de Venecia, Ramon N. Guico Jr., and town officials.

With the support of World Citi President Dr. Arlyn Grace V. Guico and Board Chairman and Mayor Ramon N. Guico Jr., the young educator sought to put his experience in academic leadership into practice by establishing a local university funded and sponsored by the municipal government.

Thus, Ordinance No. 2005-007, "Establishing University of Eastern Pangasinan and for other Purposes" was approved on December 9, 2005.

Hence, UEP was born and started operations in the upper "palengke" building of the Barangay Poblacion. Now, the UEP has metamorphosed into a modern structure in its new campus along McArthur Highway, Brgy. Canarvacanan, through the responsible leadership of Mayor Ramon V. Guico III.

BOARD COURSES

- Bachelor of Science in Agribusiness
- Bachelor of Elementary Education
- Bachelor of Secondary Education
- Bachelor of Science in Accountancy
- Bachelor of Science in Criminology
- Bachelor of Science in Midwifery
- Bachelor of Science in Civil Engineering
- Bachelor of Early Childhood Education

NON-BOARD COURSES:

- Bachelor of Science in Accounting Information System
- Bachelor of Science in Business Administration
- Bachelor of Science in Hospitality Management
- Bachelor of Science in Information Technology
- Bachelor of Science in Industrial Security Management.

=== WCC Aeronautical and Technological College ===
The aeronautical school that sits at the heart of Binalonan, Pangasinan. It also has the College of Engineering and Aviation Technology, College of Arts and Sciences, College of Tourism, and Flight Attendant Course. It offers the Flight Navigator Trainers Procedure II with MRO facilities, including its Airbus A320 full flight simulator.

=== Primary and elementary schools ===
- Balangobong-San Pablo Elementary School
- Balisa Elementary School
- Binalonan Nazarene Christian Academy
- Binalonan North Central School SPED Center
- Binalonan South Central School
- Bued Elementary School
- Camangaan Elementary School
- Capas Elementary School
- Casantiagoan Elementary School
- Cili Elementary School
- Dumayat Elementary School
- Calixto A. Bautista Elementary School
- Go Walk Christian School
- Linmansangan Elementary School
- Moreno Elementary School
- Pasileng Elementary School
- San Felipe Elementary School
- Santiago Elementary School
- Sta. Catalina Elementary School
- Sta. Fe Learning Center
- Sta. Maria Elementary School
- Sumabnit Elementary School
- Tabuyoc Elementary School
- Vacante Elementary School

=== Secondary schools ===
- Batasan National High School
- Bugayong Integrated School
- Juan G. Macaraeg National High School
- San Felipe National High School
- Sta. Maria National High School
- Sumabnit National High School

=== Higher educational institution ===
- WCC Aeronautical and Technological College
- University of Eastern Pangasinan

== Notable personalities ==
Notable people who either were born or resided in Binalonan include:

- Carlos Bulosan, Filipino-American writer best known for the novel America is in the Heart
- Eva Macapagal, spouse of 9th President Diosdado Macapagal, and mother of 14th President Gloria Macapagal Arroyo.
- Ramon Guico Jr., Member of the Philippine House of Representatives from Pangasinan's 5th district
- Leo Soriano, former bishop of United Methodist Church in the Philippines (2000-2012).
