= Pangasinan State University =

Public university in Pangasinan, Philippines

- Pamantasang Pampamahalaan ng Pangasinan (Filipino)
- Type: State university
- Established: July 1, 1979; 47 years ago
- Academic affiliations: PASUC
- Chairman: Ronald L. Adamat
- President: Elbert M. Galas
- Students: 32,026 (2018)
- Location: Lingayen, Pangasinan, Philippines (Office of the President); 16°01′55″N 120°13′48″E
- Campus: Nine campuses
- Colors: Royal blue and golden yellow
- Nickname: Golden Lions
- Sporting affiliations: SCUAA
- Mascot: Golden Lion
- Website: www.psu.edu.ph
- Location in Luzon Location in the Philippines

Pangasinan State University (PSU; Filipino: Pamantasang Pampamahalaan ng Pangasinan) is a state university in the province of Pangasinan, Philippines, founded in 1979, although its origins trace back to the 1920s. It was chartered by the Presidential Decree No. 1497, which consolidated existing schools in the province. The university consists of nine campuses at Alaminos, Asingan, Bayambang, Binmaley, Infanta, San Carlos City, Santa Maria, and Urdaneta City, with Lingayen serving as the administrative seat of the university system, housing the Office of the University President and the Board of Regents.

Each campus acts as a regional hub for distinct specialized academic fields and offers undergraduate programs in those fields, mostly inherited from the system's predecessor schools and a campus' geographical location. Notable configurations include engineering and architecture in Urdaneta; teacher education and nursing in Bayambang; aquaculture and marine sciences in Binmaley; and agricultural engineering in Santa Maria. Foundational programs such as business administration, hospitality management, and information technology are distributed across multiple campuses, while graduate studies are primarily hosted by the School of Advanced Studies in Urdaneta and the Open University System in Lingayen.

The university is the first educational institution in the Philippines to receive the Philippine Quality Award Level III for Mastery in Quality Management. Its programs are systematically accredited by the Accrediting Agency of Chartered Colleges and Universities in the Philippines (AACCUP) and include Centers of Excellence designated by the Commission on Higher Education. The teacher education program at the Bayambang campus and the fisheries program at the Binmaley campus are designated as Centers of Excellence.

== History ==
=== Early history ===
The Pangasinan State University traces its origins as far back as 1920s, when its predecessor schools which are state-funded institutions all operated independently across the province.

The Central Luzon Teachers College in Bayambang was founded in 1922 as Bayambang Normal School, which at the time only offered secondary normal course to produce the much needed teachers for the country at the time, before becoming the Pangasinan Normal School, which then offered a two-year teacher education program. It was among the first normal schools in the Philippines. In 1952, the school started offering four-year degree in teacher education, specifically for elementary school teachers. In 1953, it operated as a school district, merging and overseeing the elementary schools in Bautista, and the Bayambang National High School, after being designated as a UNESCO community training center. By 1969, it was institutionalized and became the Central Luzon Teacher's College, expanding its scope from serving the province of Pangasinan to a broader central Luzon.

In Asingan, the annex of nearby Binalonan High School, was opened in 1962 at the building that previously housed the Pacifican Institute of Asingan. The annex was later expanded through the donation of Concha Miguel, separated from Binalonan High School, and became the Asingan High School in 1967. The high school was later converted into Asingan School of Arts and Trades and started college degree programs such Bachelor in Industrial Technology.

The other state-funded institutions that operated at the time include the Eastern Pangasinan Agricultural College, which started as a secondary school for agriculture in Santa Maria before being upgraded into a vocational college in 1965; the Pangasinan School of Arts and Trades in Lingayen; the Pangasinan College of Fisheries in Binmaley; and the Speaker Eugenio Perez National Agricultural School in San Carlos, which offered two-year associate program in Agricultural Technology in 1974 before offering the four-year bachelor's program in Agricultural Education in 1976.

=== Founding and expansion ===
The Pangasinan State University was chartered by Presidential Decree No. 1497 promulgated on June 11, 1978. It became fully operational on July 1, 1979. The university is an integration of the college courses of six government-supported institutions in the province with the Central Luzon Teachers College as the only tertiary education component then. The planned Western Pangasinan College of Agriculture created through P.D. No. 1494 was also integrated although it was not yet operational at the time of integration. The Central Luzon Teachers College maintains laboratory units in the elementary and secondary levels.

The newly founded university had six campuses which mostly evolved from its predecessor schools. The Santa Maria, San Carlos, and Lingayen campuses were founded from separating the college programs of Eastern Pangasinan Agricultural College, Speaker Eugenio Perez National Agricultural School, and Pangasinan School of Arts and Trades, respectively, from the three school's secondary or vocational programs. The Bayambang campus evolved from the existing Central Luzon Teachers College, Asingan campus from the Asingan School of Arts and Trades, and Binmaley campus from the Pangasinan College of Fisheries.

In 1981, the Infanta campus became operational, followed by the establishment of the College of Engineering and Technology in Urdaneta in 1982 before becoming a stand-alone campus. The Alaminos campus became the ninth campus of PSU in 2009. It was conceptualized to serve western Pangasinan and northern Zambales, and opened in 2010.

== Organization ==
Presidents of the
Pangasinan State University
Telesforo N. Boquiren, June 1978 – 1985
Reynaldo P. Segui (OIC), 1985 – 1986
Rufino O. Eslao, 1986 -1992
Reynaldo P. Segui, 1992 – June 1999
Rodolfo V. Asanion, June 1999 – 2007
Victoriano C. Estira, June 2007 – 2014
Dexter R. Buted, December 2014 – December 2022
Elbert M. Galas, December 2022 – Present

=== Board of Regents ===
PSU Board of Regents, composed of 12 members, is the highest decision-making body of the PSU system. It could be chaired by Commission on Higher Education chairman/commissioner. Other members are the president of the university, senate and house representatives, government representatives, private sector representatives, PSU Federated Alumni Association, PSU Federated Faculty Association, and PSU Federated Student Association representatives.

=== University President ===
PSU President is elected for a single term by the university's Board of Regents. The board can also choose to extend the term of the president based on substantial grounds and merits of the official's performance.

== Campuses ==
At present, there are nine campuses that make up Pangasinan State University. Each of these campuses are spread out throughout the Province of Pangasinan, and often serve as a hub in the Ilocos Region for distinct specialized academic fields. Most of the undergraduate programs offered by each campus are based on this specialization, and often originated from the system's predecessor schools and the geographical location of a campus. Some of the notable configurations include engineering and architecture in Urdaneta; teacher education and nursing in Bayambang from its predecessor normal school Central Luzon Teachers College; aquaculture and marine sciences in the coastal town of Binmaley; and agricultural engineering in Santa Maria. Foundational programs, meanwhile, such as business administration, hospitality management, and information technology are distributed across multiple campuses, while graduate studies are primarily hosted by the School of Advanced Studies in Urdaneta and the Open University System in Lingayen.

Campus	Founded	Enrollment (2021)	Focus field (Note: Non-exhaustive)		
Campus	Founded	Alaminos	2009	2,070	Management
Asingan	1978	1,064	Industrial technology		
Bayambang	1978	5,883	Center of Excellence in teacher education; nursing		
Binmaley	1978	1,525	Center of Excellence in fisheries		
Infanta	1981	499	Agriculture business		
Lingayen	1978	6,933	Business administration and hospitality		
San Carlos	1978	4,649	Office administration		
Santa Maria	1978	1,784	Agriculture		
Urdaneta	1982	4,957	Engineering and architecture		

=== Additional academic units ===
- PSU School for Advanced Studies

The School of Advanced Studies originated from the programs of the then Central Luzon Teachers College. The now PSU-Bayambang Campus had a humble beginning. It started as the Bayambang Normal School in 1922, folded up in the thirties due to world-wide economic crisis, re-opened and renamed Pangasinan Normal School (PNS) in 1948. In 1953, it became a part of the Philippine – UNESCO National Community Training Center (PUNCTC). From a two-year (ETC) collegiate institution, it offered the four-year teacher education program in 1954 by virtue of RA No. 975. In 1961, its graduate program was opened. In 1969, the school was chartered through RA No. 5705 to be known as the Central Luzon Teachers College.

In 1978 by virtue of the issuance of P.D. No. 4197, the Pangasinan State University was created. In 1982, the doctoral program of the university was offered. PSU-Bayambang Campus, with its teacher education program, was made the center. In 1987, there were four centers of the Graduate School located at PSU-Bayambang, PSU-Lingayen, PSU-Sta. Maria, and PSU-Urdaneta, with the latter as its central office. The following year, the master's program of PSU-Sta. Maria was transferred to PSU-Urdaneta. Thus, there were three centers in 1988 to 1994. In 1994, all graduate programs were centralized in PSU-Graduate School – Urdaneta City.

- PSU Open University Systems

The Pangasinan State University established the Open University System in the latter part of the year 1996. It was formally launched at PSU-Lingayen in March 1997 with the presence of former Speaker Jose de Venecia Jr. who was instrumental in the funding of the initial two years of operation of the system. The establishment of the PSU-OUS was borne out of the need to respond to the unique needs for further professional and technical development of career people, administrators and managers, technicians and workers who may not have the time or opportunity to attend or perform the regular university programs while at work.

=== Basic education ===
- Pangasinan State University Bayambang
  - Laboratory High School
  - Laboratory Elementary/Kindergarten
- Pangasinan State University Infanta
  - Laboratory High School

== Academics ==
Pangasinan State University is a state-funded university, making tuition waived for students under the Universal Access to Quality Tertiary Education Act. Its curricular programs are accredited by the Accrediting Agency of Chartered Colleges and Universities in the Philippines (AACCUP), part of the Asia-Pacific Qualifying Network and International Network for Quality Assurance Agencies in Higher Education, making PSU's programs recognized worldwide.

In research, Pangasinan State University has the most number of Scopus-indexed journal publications among the state universities and colleges in the Ilocos Region.

PSU, in collaboration with the Department of Science and Technology, operates the technology business incubator Aligwas TBI. The Aligwas TBI primarily focuses on sustainable food systems startups. Also in collaboration with the department are the Bamboo Textile Innovation Hub and the Asin Center, the first national research and development center for salt.

In 2016, PSU became the first state university or college in the Philippines to be certified by ISO 9001:2015, with multiple of its campuses certified the following year. In 2021, the Department of Trade and Industry recognized the university as the first educational institution in the country to be awarded with the Philippine Quality Award Level III or Mastery Quality Management.

PSU ranked sixth in the Philippines in the AppliedHE publication's 2026 Asia Public Universities ranking.

== Notable alumni ==
List of Pangasinan State University Notable Alumni

- Amado Totaan Espino Jr., Governor of Pangasinan
- Claude Bautista, politician from Davao Occidental
- Virgilio U. Manzano, UNESCO-Chair for the Scientific Literacy Training Program at Hiroshima University.
