= Juan G. Macaraeg National High School =

Public secondary institution in Binalonan, Pangasinan, Philippines

- Mataas na Paaralang Juan G. Macaraeg (Filipino)

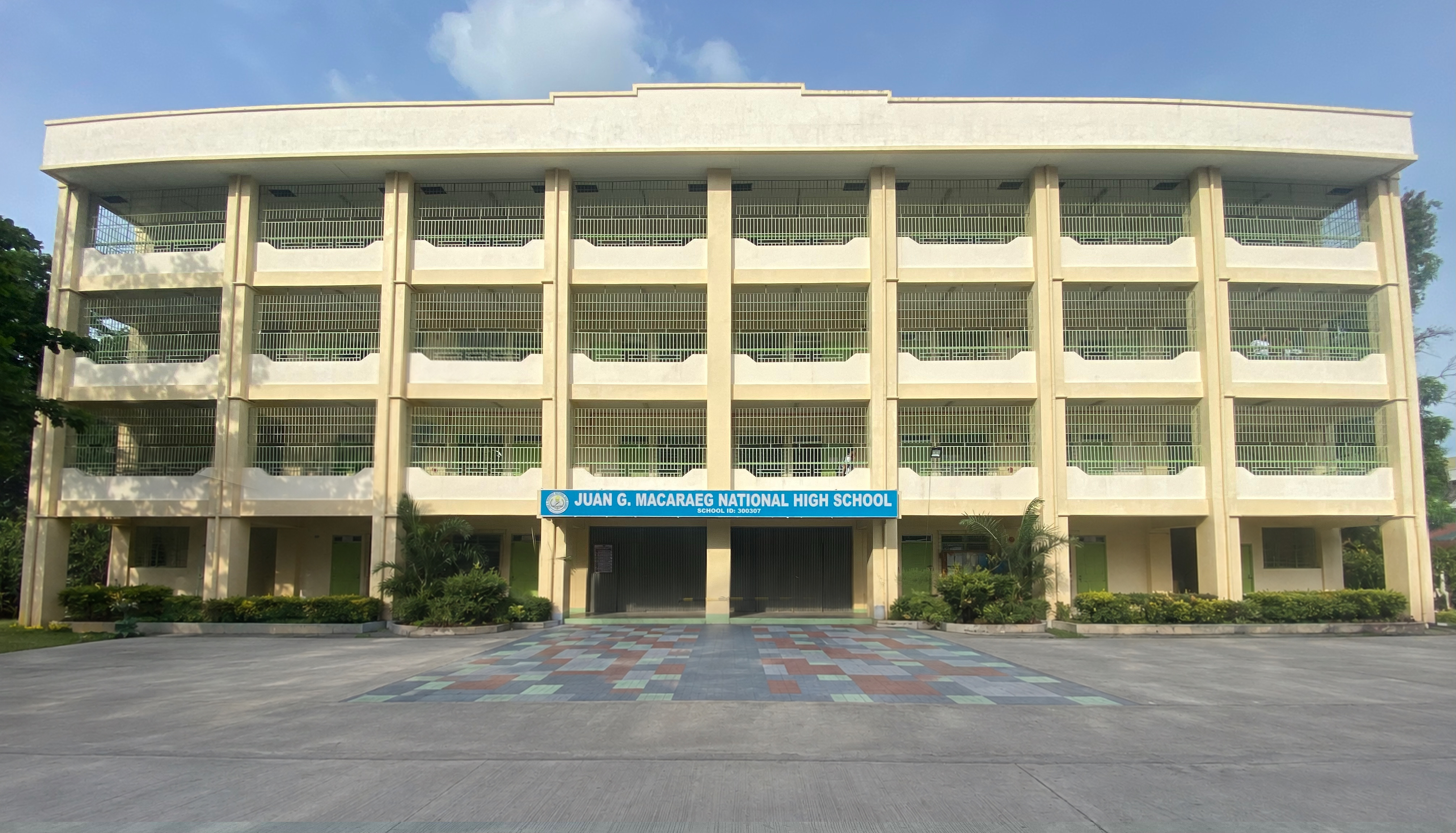
- School facade

Location
- Guico St., Brgy. Canarvacanan; Binalonan, Pangasinan 2436; Philippines; 16°03′06.0″N 120°35′19.5″E

Information
- Former names: List: Binalonan Community High School Binalonan High School Binalonan National High School
- Type: Public secondary school
- Motto: Learn. Lead. Serve.
- Established: March 14, 1946; 80 years ago
- School number: 300307
- Principal: Remedios O. Nipal
- Officer in charge: Zosima Irene H. Fernandez
- Grades: 7–10 (Junior High School); 11–12 (Senior High School)
- Enrollment: 3,576 (2019)
- Language: English; Filipino
- Campus size: 28 acres (0.11 km^{2})
- Colors: Maroon; Forest green
- Song: Binalonan High Loyalty Song
- Publication: The Binalonian (English); Ang Pabaon (Filipino)
- Affiliation: DepEd Region 1
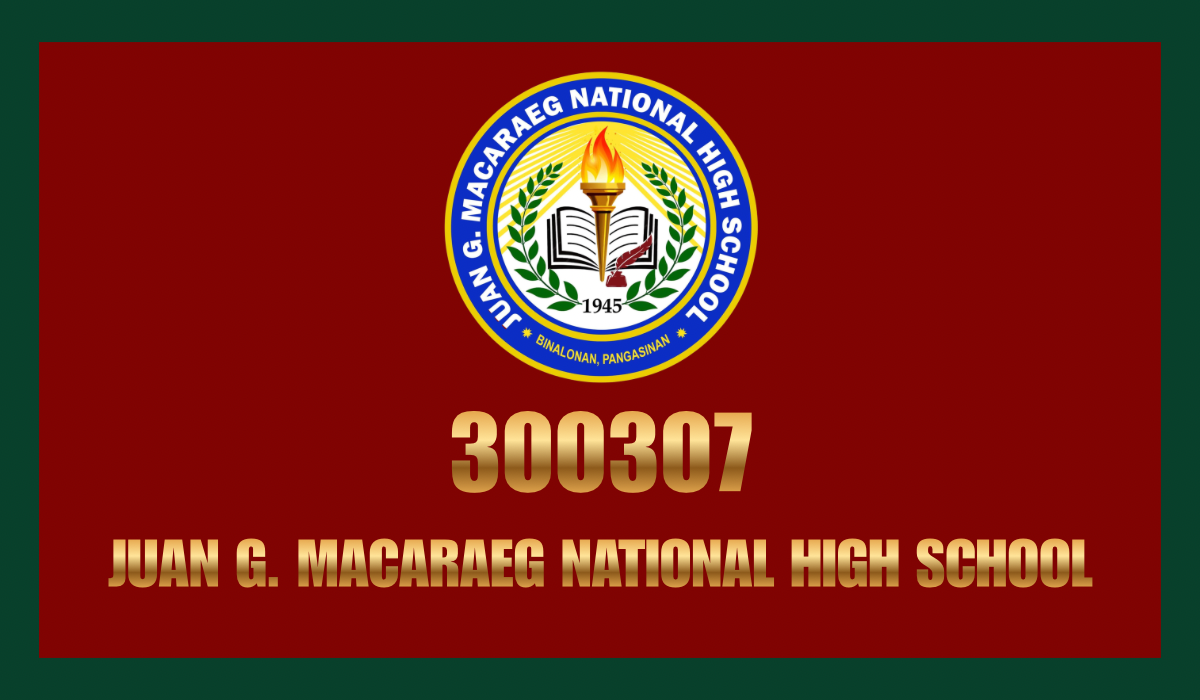
- Flag

Juan G. Macaraeg National High School (also referred to as Juan G., abbreviated as JGMNHS) is a public secondary school in Binalonan, Pangasinan, Philippines. It offers junior high school and senior high school education and serves students from Binalonan and nearby municipalities.

== History ==
The institution was established in 1945 as Binalonan High School, shortly after World War II in the Philippines. Early classes were conducted in temporary facilities using repurposed structures.

The school was converted into a national school through Batas Pambansa Blg. 276, approved on November 14, 1982, which changed the Binalonan Community High School into the Binalonan National High School and authorized funding for its operation and maintenance.

== Etymology ==
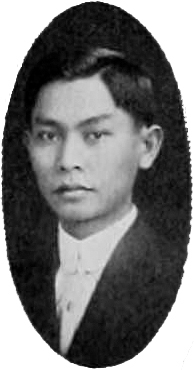
Macaraeg in 1912

The name Juan G. Macaraeg National High School is derived from Engr. Juan Guico-Macaraeg, a notable Filipino civil engineer and public servant during the American colonial period. The institution was originally known as Binalonan National High School but was later renamed in his honor in recognition of his significant contributions to public infrastructure and his donation of the land on which the school was established.

The inclusion of his surname, Macaraeg, reflects a legacy associated with public service, engineering, and national development. The renaming serves both as a tribute to his role in advancing education in the municipality of Binalonan and as a means of preserving his historical and familial legacy within the local community.

== Academics ==
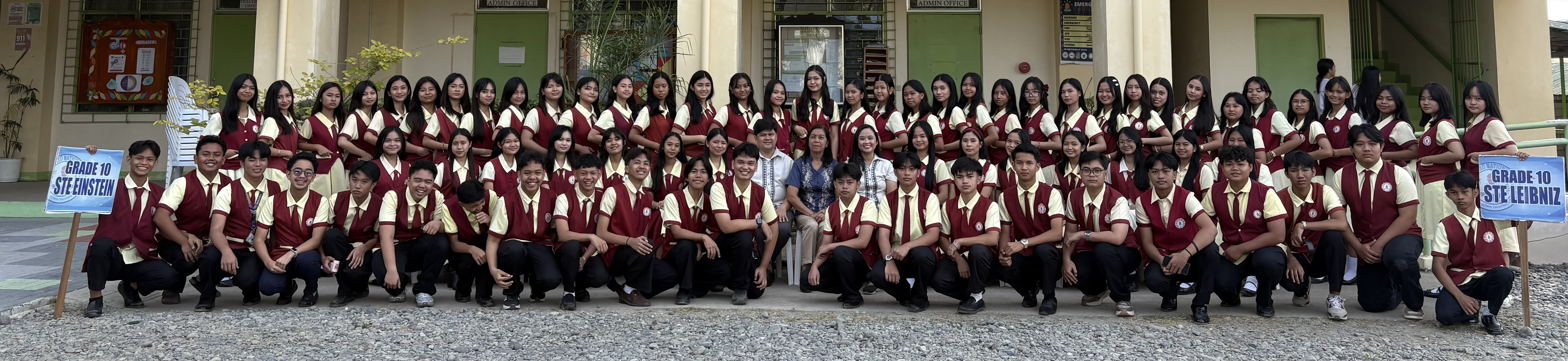
STE Students in their STE Uniform

The school implements programs under the Philippine basic education system, including:

- Science, Technology, and Engineering (STE) Program
- Special Program in the Arts (SPA)
- Special Program in Foreign Language (SPFL)

Beginning in School Year 2026–2027, the school will implement the Strengthened Senior High School (SHS) Curriculum, following its initial rollout in selected pilot schools during the previous school year.

== Student organizations ==
The school maintains a variety of student-led clubs and co-curricular organizations supervised by faculty advisers and recognized by the administration. These organizations support students' academic, leadership, cultural, scientific, and community-oriented development. The school's primary student governing body is the Supreme Secondary Learner Government (SSLG), which represents the student body and organizes leadership and campus activities.

Recognized student organizations include:

- Binalonan Arts and Culture Society
- Balagtas Club
- Barkada Kontra Bisyo
- Campus Integrity Crusaders
- Digital Club
- English Club
- Foreign Language Club
- Girl Scouts of the Philippines (JHS)
- Girl Scouts of the Philippines (SHS)
- Juan Dominion Students Pioneering Automation and Robotics Club
- Kalahi
- Millennium Achievers Science Club
- PEARS Club
- Performing Arts Club
- Population Development Club
- Philippine Society of Youth Science Clubs
- Philippine Red Cross Youth Club
- STEP Club
- Sociable Youth of the Nation Club
- Youth for Environment in Science Organization
- Bagong Bahaghari Club

Many of these organizations participate in interschool competitions, leadership training programs, environmental campaigns, science fairs, scouting activities, and community outreach initiatives.

== Awards and recognition ==
In 2019, Millennium Achievers Science Club, the science club of Juan G. Macaraeg National High School, was awarded "Most Outstanding Science Club of the Philippines" for the year 2018–2019 by the Philippine Society of Youth Science Clubs (PSYSC) during the awarding ceremony held at Ang Bahay ng Alumni, University of the Philippines Diliman, Quezon City.

In 2025, the Juan G. Macaraeg National High School Robotics Team, known as "Juan Terra", was named Overall 2nd Runner-Up at the 4th National/International Robotics and Automation Competition held at Don Bosco Technical Institute of Makati in Makati. The team also won the championship in the Mobile Control V2 category, second place in Line Tracing V3 (Open Category), and third place in EROVOUTHON.

In 2026, the Juan G. Macaraeg National High School Robotics Team brought home six major awards at the 14th International Robotics Competition held in Oradea, Romania. The team won first place in the Erobot Challenge (E-Soccerbot), second place in the Super AI Track Advanced and Line Follower Junior categories, and third place in the Humanoid Robot Football and Mega Sumo events.

== Notable alumni ==
- Ramon N. Guico Jr., politician and businessman who served as mayor of Binalonan for several terms and has represented Pangasinan's 5th congressional district in the House of Representatives of the Philippines since 2022. An alumnus of the school when it was known as Binalonan Community High School, he belonged to Batch 1970 and was recognized as the school's Most Outstanding Alumnus during the 2020 Grand Alumni Homecoming.
