= San Roque Dam (Philippines) =

Dam in Pangasinan, Philippines

- Location in Luzon Location in the Philippines
- Location: San Manuel and San Nicolas, Pangasinan; and Itogon, Benguet, Philippines
- Coordinates: 16°08′45″N 120°41′02″E
- Construction began: 1998
- Opening date: May 1, 2003
- Construction cost: US $1.19 billion
- Operator: San Roque Multi-purpose Project

Dam and spillways
- Impounds: Agno River
- Height: 200 m (660 ft)
- Length: 1,130 m (3,710 ft)

Reservoir
- Total capacity: 835 million cubic metres (677,000 acre⋅ft)

Power Station
- Hydraulic head: 150.4 m (493 ft)
- Turbines: 3 Vertical shaft Francis turbines
- Installed capacity: 345 MW; 435 MW (max)

The San Roque Dam, operated under San Roque Multipurpose Project (SRMP) is a 200-meter-tall, 1.2-kilometre (0.75 mi) long embankment dam on the Agno River. It is the largest dam in the Philippines and sixteenth largest in the world (see List of largest dams in the world). It spans the municipalities of San Manuel and San Nicolas, Pangasinan, nearly 200 km north of Metro Manila.

The dam impounds a reservoir with a surface area of about 12.8 square kilometers extending North into the municipality of Itogon in Benguet. A gated spillway protects the dam from overtopping. Each wet season, the run-off is stored for later release via water turbines to generate power and irrigate crops.

Agno River is the third largest river in the Philippines with a total length of 221 kilometers and a drainage basin at the Project site of 1,225 square kilometers. The river originates in the Cordillera Mountains, initially flows from north to south, divides into several channels in the flat central plain of Luzon and meanders westerly through the provinces of Pangasinan and Tarlac before emptying into Lingayen Gulf. The dam and its immediate river basin are protected as a forest reserve known as the Lower Agno Watershed Forest Reserve.

San Roque Power Corporation (SRPC) financed and constructed the SRMP under a power purchase agreement (PPA) with the National Power Corporation (NPC) on a Build-Operate-Transfer (BOT) basis. SRPC substantially completed the SRMP at midnight, February 14, 2003, at which time its peaking power, irrigation, flood control and enhanced water quality benefits became available to the surrounding regions, which include the Northwest Luzon Economic Growth Quadrangle. In reality, all but its power benefits have been available since mid-2002 when the dam and spillway were completed.

Ownership of the dam and spillway was transferred to NPC upon construction completion, as it contributed funds for the non-power components on behalf of several agencies. SRPC will own and operate the power generating facilities for 25 years, after which their ownership transfers to NPC.

== Power ==
The SRMP has an installed rated capacity of 345 megawatts (MW). It operates primarily as a peaking plant during periods each day when the electrical output of base and inter-mediate load power plants cannot fulfill consumer demand. Capacity of 100 MW, which is the basis for the capacity payments under the PPA. The balance is surplus power that reduces dependence on imported fuel oil and also lowers the variable operating expenses of other power plants.

The SRMP offers substantial power benefits in addition to the peaking capacity and energy considered in the economic analysis conducted by NPC and the National Economic Development Authority. Most of these benefits are unique to large hydroelectric facilities.

== Irrigation ==
The SRMP can provide year-round irrigation benefits for 708 square kilometers of farmland downstream of the dam with a partially diversified crop during the dry season, mostly in Pangasinan, but including parts of Nueva Ecija and Tarlac.

== Flood control ==
The SRMP produces a marked attenuation (reduction) in the perennial flooding of the Agno River affecting at least 16 Pangasinan and Tarlac towns. It is complemented by the 3-phase, PhP200 billion Agno Flood Control Project managed by DPWH. Phases I, II, and III are completed since 2009.

== Water quality ==
The SRMP improves the quality of the water in the Lower Agno River via a proactive integrated watershed management plan (IWMP) and by trapping sediments caused by erosion and by such other sources as small-scale mining.

== See also ==
- Water supply and sanitation in the Philippines
- Energy in the Philippines
