= Ramon Guico Jr. =

Filipino civil engineer and politician (born 1953)

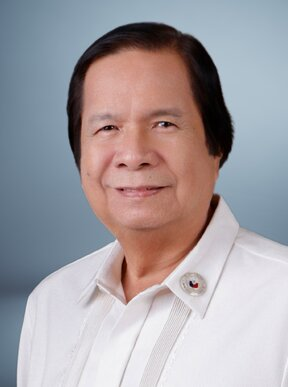
- Official portrait, 2025

Member of the Philippine House of Representatives from Pangasinan's 5th district
- Incumbent
- Assumed office June 30, 2022
- Preceded by: Ramon Guico III

Chairman of the League of Municipalities of the Philippines
- In office 2001–2010

Mayor of Binalonan
- In office June 30, 2019 – June 30, 2022
- Vice Mayor: Melicio F. Patague II
- Preceded by: Ramon Guico III
- Succeeded by: Ramon Ronald Guico IV
- In office June 30, 2001 – June 30, 2010
- Vice Mayor: Ramon Guico III (2007–2010)
- Succeeded by: Ramon Guico III
- In office February 2, 1988 – June 30, 1998

Personal details
- Born: December 10, 1953 (age 72) Binalonan, Pangasinan, Philippines
- Party: Lakas (2001–present)
- Spouse: Arlyn Grace Velicaria
- Children: Ramon III; Ramon Ronald IV; Mike; Michelle; Melissa; Patrick
- Education: University of Baguio (BS)
- Occupation: Politician, businessman
- Profession: Civil engineer

Ramon "Monching" Naval Guico Jr. (born December 10, 1953) is a Filipino civil engineer, politician and businessman who has been the representative of Pangasinan's 5th congressional district since 2022. He is the President of the League of Municipalities of the Philippines (LMP) and former mayor of Binalonan, Pangasinan, which aims to strengthen the local government and provide faster and improved services to the people. He ran for Senator in the 2010 elections but lost.

== Early life and education ==
Guico was born on December 10, 1953 in Binalonan. He is the third child of Ramon Guico Sr. of Pangasinan and Vicenta Naval of Isabela. Born an entrepreneur, Ramon at age 5 and throughout his elementary and high school helped his mother, “Aling Quita” in their store. He was President of his high school student council.

Ramon went to Baguio for college and took up civil engineering at the University of Baguio. He met his future wife, Arlyn, a pharmacist, in the nearby town of Santo Tomas.

== Business career ==
In the early 1970s, while newly married. Guico began a poultry and hog-raising business. He then divided his business into gravel and sand by buying junk Philtranco buses to be used for the transport of sand and other aggregates. This earned him the moniker, "Nabubulok" or Junk Man by his relatives and friends. Guico then ventured into the construction business where he built dams and farm-to-market roads. In 1985, he entered the business of healthcare and education, which by then was the largest business venture he had undertaken.

== Political career ==
=== Mayor of Binalonan (1988–1998; 2001–2010; 2019–2022) ===
In 1987, Guico was appointed by President Cory Aquino as mayor of Binalonan, Pangasinan. Binalonan was a 5th-class municipality when Guico took office.

Guico also served as President of the League of Municipalities of the Philippines. To correct the image of the LMP as nothing but a forum for mayors to socialize, Ramon used the LMP as a platform for mayors to share their practices. During his first term as LMP National President, he launched the Ang Galing mo Mayor (You are the Best Mayor) project, as LMP’s serious efforts to promote innovation and excellence in local governance.

During Ramon’s second term, the LMP founded the Mayor’s Development Center (MDC), a first in Philippine local government organization and even the first in Asia.

=== House of Representatives (2022–present) ===
In 2022 elections, Guico was elected representative of the 5th district of Pangasinan.
