= Pangasinan's 5th congressional district =

Legislative district of the Philippines

- Constituency for the House of Representatives of the Philippines
- Boundary of Pangasinan's 5th congressional district in Pangasinan

- Location of Pangasinan within the Philippines
- Province: Pangasinan
- Region: Ilocos Region
- Population: 526,367 (2020)
- Electorate: 352,414 (2022)
- Major settlements: 9 LGUs: Cities; Urdaneta; Municipalities; Alcala; Bautista; Binalonan; Laoac; Pozorrubio; Santo Tomas; Sison; Villasis
- Area: 585.67 km^{2} (226.13 sq mi)

Current constituency
- Created: 1907
- Representative: Ramon Guico Jr.
- Political party: Lakas
- Congressional bloc: Majority

Pangasinan's 5th congressional district is one of the six congressional districts of the Philippines in the province of Pangasinan. It has been represented in the House of Representatives of the Philippines since 1916 and earlier in the Philippine Assembly from 1907 to 1916. The district consists of the City of Urdaneta and adjacent municipalities of Alcala, Bautista, Binalonan, Laoac, Pozorrubio, Santo Tomas, Sison, and Villasis. Prior to its second dissolution in 1972, it consisted of the eastern municipalities of Asingan, Balungao, Natividad, Rosales, San Manuel, San Nicolas, San Quintin, Santa Maria, Tayug, and Umingan, now comprising the 6th district since 1987. It is currently represented in the 20th Congress by Ramon Guico Jr. of the Lakas–CMD (Lakas).

== Representation history ==
#	Image	Member	Term of office		Legislature	Party	Electoral history	Constituent LGUs
#	Image	Member	Start	End	Legislature	Party	Electoral history	Constituent LGUs
=== Pangasinan's 5th district for the Philippine Assembly ===
District created January 9, 1907.
1		Matías González	October 16, 1907	October 16, 1909	1st	Independent	Elected in 1907.	1907–1916; Asingan, Balungao, Natividad, Rosales, San Manuel, San Nicolas, San Quintin, Santa Maria, Tayug, Umingan
2		Domingo Patajo	October 16, 1909	October 16, 1912	2nd	Independent	Elected in 1909.	1907–1916; Asingan, Balungao, Natividad, Rosales, San Manuel, San Nicolas, San Quintin, Santa Maria, Tayug, Umingan
3		Hugo Sansano	October 16, 1912	October 16, 1916	3rd	Nacionalista	Elected in 1912.	1907–1916; Asingan, Balungao, Natividad, Rosales, San Manuel, San Nicolas, San Quintin, Santa Maria, Tayug, Umingan
=== Pangasinan's 5th district for the House of Representatives of the Philippine Islands ===
4		Bernabé de Guzmán	October 16, 1916	June 3, 1919	4th	Nacionalista	Elected in 1916.	1916–1935; Asingan, Balungao, Natividad, Rosales, San Manuel, San Nicolas, San Quintin, Santa Maria, Tayug, Umingan
5		Ricardo González	June 3, 1919	June 2, 1925	5th	Nacionalista	Elected in 1919.	1916–1935; Asingan, Balungao, Natividad, Rosales, San Manuel, San Nicolas, San Quintin, Santa Maria, Tayug, Umingan
5		Ricardo González	June 3, 1919	June 2, 1925	6th	Nacionalista; Unipersonalista	Re-elected in 1922.	1916–1935; Asingan, Balungao, Natividad, Rosales, San Manuel, San Nicolas, San Quintin, Santa Maria, Tayug, Umingan
6		Evaristo P. Sánchez	June 2, 1925	June 5, 1928	7th	Nacionalista; Consolidado	Elected in 1925.	1916–1935; Asingan, Balungao, Natividad, Rosales, San Manuel, San Nicolas, San Quintin, Santa Maria, Tayug, Umingan
7		Juan G. Millán	June 5, 1928	June 5, 1934	8th	Demócrata	Elected in 1928.	1916–1935; Asingan, Balungao, Natividad, Rosales, San Manuel, San Nicolas, San Quintin, Santa Maria, Tayug, Umingan
7		Juan G. Millán	June 5, 1928	June 5, 1934	9th	Demócrata	Re-elected in 1931.	1916–1935; Asingan, Balungao, Natividad, Rosales, San Manuel, San Nicolas, San Quintin, Santa Maria, Tayug, Umingan
8		Narciso Ramos	June 5, 1934	September 16, 1935	10th	Nacionalista; Democrático	Elected in 1934.	1916–1935; Asingan, Balungao, Natividad, Rosales, San Manuel, San Nicolas, San Quintin, Santa Maria, Tayug, Umingan
#	Image	Member	Term of office		National Assembly	Party	Electoral history	Constituent LGUs
#	Image	Member	Start	End	National Assembly	Party	Electoral history	Constituent LGUs
=== Pangasinan's 5th district for the National Assembly (Commonwealth of the Philippines) ===
(8)		Narciso Ramos	September 16, 1935	December 30, 1941	1st	Nacionalista; Democrático	Re-elected in 1935.	1935–1941; Asingan, Balungao, Natividad, Rosales, San Manuel, San Nicolas, San Quintin, Santa Maria, Tayug, Umingan
(8)		Narciso Ramos	September 16, 1935	December 30, 1941	2nd	Nacionalista	Re-elected in 1938.	1935–1941; Asingan, Balungao, Natividad, Rosales, San Manuel, San Nicolas, San Quintin, Santa Maria, Tayug, Umingan
District dissolved into the two-seat Pangasinan's at-large district for the National Assembly (Second Philippine Republic).
#	Image	Member	Term of office		Common wealth Congress	Party	Electoral history	Constituent LGUs
#	Image	Member	Start	End	Common wealth Congress	Party	Electoral history	Constituent LGUs
=== Pangasinan's 5th district for the House of Representatives of the Commonwealth of the Philippines ===
District re-created May 24, 1945.
(8)		Narciso Ramos	June 11, 1945	May 25, 1946	1st	Nacionalista	Re-elected in 1941.	1945–1946; Asingan, Balungao, Natividad, Rosales, San Manuel, San Nicolas, San Quintin, Santa Maria, Tayug, Umingan
#	Image	Member	Term of office		Congress	Party	Electoral history	Constituent LGUs
#	Image	Member	Start	End	Congress	Party	Electoral history	Constituent LGUs
=== Pangasinan's 5th district for the House of Representatives of the Philippines ===
(8)		Narciso Ramos	May 25, 1946	July 15, 1946	1st	Liberal	Re-elected in 1946. Resigned on appointment as minister-counsellor to the United Nations.	1946–1972; Asingan, Balungao, Natividad, Rosales, San Manuel, San Nicolas, San Quintin, Santa Maria, Tayug, Umingan
9		Cipriano S. Allas	March 17, 1947	December 30, 1953	1st	Liberal	Elected in 1947 to finish Ramos's term.	1946–1972; Asingan, Balungao, Natividad, Rosales, San Manuel, San Nicolas, San Quintin, Santa Maria, Tayug, Umingan
9		Cipriano S. Allas	March 17, 1947	December 30, 1953	2nd	Liberal	Re-elected in 1949.	1946–1972; Asingan, Balungao, Natividad, Rosales, San Manuel, San Nicolas, San Quintin, Santa Maria, Tayug, Umingan
10		Justino Z. Benito	December 30, 1953	December 30, 1957	3rd	Liberal	Elected in 1953.	1946–1972; Asingan, Balungao, Natividad, Rosales, San Manuel, San Nicolas, San Quintin, Santa Maria, Tayug, Umingan
11		Luciano Millán	December 30, 1957	December 30, 1965	4th	Nacionalista	Elected in 1957.	1946–1972; Asingan, Balungao, Natividad, Rosales, San Manuel, San Nicolas, San Quintin, Santa Maria, Tayug, Umingan
11		Luciano Millán	December 30, 1957	December 30, 1965	5th	Nacionalista	Re-elected in 1961.	1946–1972; Asingan, Balungao, Natividad, Rosales, San Manuel, San Nicolas, San Quintin, Santa Maria, Tayug, Umingan
12		Jesús M. Reyes	December 30, 1965	December 30, 1969	6th	Liberal	Elected in 1965.	1946–1972; Asingan, Balungao, Natividad, Rosales, San Manuel, San Nicolas, San Quintin, Santa Maria, Tayug, Umingan
13		Robert B. Estrella	December 30, 1969	September 23, 1972	7th	Nacionalista	Elected in 1969. Removed from office after imposition of martial law.	1946–1972; Asingan, Balungao, Natividad, Rosales, San Manuel, San Nicolas, San Quintin, Santa Maria, Tayug, Umingan
District dissolved into the twelve-seat Region I's at-large district for the Interim Batasang Pambansa, followed by the six-seat Pangasinan's at-large district for the Regular Batasang Pambansa.
District re-created February 2, 1987.
14		Conrado B. Estrella Jr.	June 30, 1987	June 30, 1992	8th	KBL	Elected in 1987.	1987–present Alcala, Bautista, Binalonan, Laoac, Pozorrubio, Santo Tomas, Sison, Urdaneta, Villasis
15		Amadeo R. Perez Jr.	June 30, 1992	June 30, 2001	9th	Lakas	Elected in 1992.	1987–present Alcala, Bautista, Binalonan, Laoac, Pozorrubio, Santo Tomas, Sison, Urdaneta, Villasis
15		Amadeo R. Perez Jr.	June 30, 1992	June 30, 2001	10th	Lakas	Re-elected in 1995.	1987–present Alcala, Bautista, Binalonan, Laoac, Pozorrubio, Santo Tomas, Sison, Urdaneta, Villasis
15		Amadeo R. Perez Jr.	June 30, 1992	June 30, 2001	11th	Lakas	Re-elected in 1998.	1987–present Alcala, Bautista, Binalonan, Laoac, Pozorrubio, Santo Tomas, Sison, Urdaneta, Villasis
16		Mark Cojuangco	June 30, 2001	June 30, 2010	12th	NPC	Elected in 2001.	1987–present Alcala, Bautista, Binalonan, Laoac, Pozorrubio, Santo Tomas, Sison, Urdaneta, Villasis
16		Mark Cojuangco	June 30, 2001	June 30, 2010	13th	NPC	Re-elected in 2004.	1987–present Alcala, Bautista, Binalonan, Laoac, Pozorrubio, Santo Tomas, Sison, Urdaneta, Villasis
16		Mark Cojuangco	June 30, 2001	June 30, 2010	14th	NPC	Re-elected in 2007.	1987–present Alcala, Bautista, Binalonan, Laoac, Pozorrubio, Santo Tomas, Sison, Urdaneta, Villasis
17		Ma. Carmen S. Cojuangco	June 30, 2010	June 30, 2016	15th	NPC	Elected in 2010.	1987–present Alcala, Bautista, Binalonan, Laoac, Pozorrubio, Santo Tomas, Sison, Urdaneta, Villasis
17		Ma. Carmen S. Cojuangco	June 30, 2010	June 30, 2016	16th	NPC	Re-elected in 2013.	1987–present Alcala, Bautista, Binalonan, Laoac, Pozorrubio, Santo Tomas, Sison, Urdaneta, Villasis
18		Amado Espino Jr.	June 30, 2016	June 30, 2019	17th	PDP–Laban	Elected in 2016.	1987–present Alcala, Bautista, Binalonan, Laoac, Pozorrubio, Santo Tomas, Sison, Urdaneta, Villasis
19		Ramon Guico III	June 30, 2019	June 30, 2022	18th	Lakas	Elected in 2019.	1987–present Alcala, Bautista, Binalonan, Laoac, Pozorrubio, Santo Tomas, Sison, Urdaneta, Villasis
20		Ramon Guico Jr.	June 30, 2022	Incumbent	19th	Lakas	Elected in 2022.	1987–present Alcala, Bautista, Binalonan, Laoac, Pozorrubio, Santo Tomas, Sison, Urdaneta, Villasis
20		Ramon Guico Jr.	June 30, 2022	Incumbent	20th	Lakas	Re-elected in 2025.	1987–present Alcala, Bautista, Binalonan, Laoac, Pozorrubio, Santo Tomas, Sison, Urdaneta, Villasis

== Election results ==
=== 2022 ===
2022 Philippine House of Representatives elections
Party	Candidate	Votes	%
Lakas	Ramon Guico Jr.	166,921	
PDP–Laban	Niño Arboleda	114,079	
Total votes		242,093	
Lakas hold			

=== 2019 ===
2019 Philippine House of Representatives elections
Party	Candidate	Votes	%
Lakas	Ramon Guico III	125,136	
PDP–Laban	Amado Espino Jr. (incumbent)	121,624	
Total votes		367,229	
Lakas gain from PDP–Laban			

=== 2016 ===
2016 Philippine House of Representatives elections
Party	Candidate	Votes	%
Aksyon	Amado Espino, Jr.	133,381	
NPC	Carmen Cojuangco	92,943	
Margin of victory			
Invalid or blank votes		15,769	
Total votes		242,093	
Aksyon gain from NPC			

=== 2013 ===
2013 Philippine House of Representatives elections
Party	Candidate	Votes	%
NPC	Carmen Cojuangco	164,504	75.67
Independent	Demetrio Demetria	15,466	7.11
Margin of victory		149,038	68.56
Invalid or blank votes		37,412	17.22
Total votes		217,382	100.00
NPC hold			

=== 2010 ===
2010 Philippine House of Representatives elections
Party	Candidate	Votes	%
NPC	Kimi Cojuangco	140,686	69.28
Independent	Demetrio Demetria	58,938	29.02
Independent	Martin Fao-ilan	3,443	1.70
Valid ballots		203,067	93.10
Invalid or blank votes		15,041	6.90
Total votes		218,108	100.00
NPC hold			

== See also ==
- Legislative districts of Pangasinan
