= Pangasinan School of Arts and Trades =

Public school in Pangasinan, Philippines

- Location: Lingayen, Pangasinan, Philippines, Pangasinan; 16°01′50″N 120°13′34″E
- Location within Luzon Location within Philippines

Pangasinan School of Arts and Trades, also referred to as PSAT, is a government institution of technical vocational education and training higher learning located in Alvear Street, Lingayen, Pangasinan, Philippines. PSAT is duly registered by the Technical Education and Skills Development Authority. All PSAT programs are accredited by the Technical Education and Skills Development Authority (TESDA).

== History ==
Pangasinan School of Arts and Trades (PSAT) is an outgrowth of the intermediate school organized by American Roy E. Blackman in 1904. It served as a normal training department for teachers who intended to teach shopwork in the different municipalities of Pangasinan. Through the late Provincial Governor, Hon. Isabelo Artacho, the Pangasinan Trade School building was constructed in its present site in 1907.

Mr. Jorge Garcia was the first Filipino principal and was succeeded by Martin Mendoza. It was during the incumbency of Mr. Mendoza in 1923 that the first year high school level of the trade school was introduced.

In 1920 the first batch of students of the four-year trade curriculum graduated. The shop courses offered then were Woodworking, Building Construction and Automotive.

In 1929 – 1930, the Pangasinan Vocational High School emerged as an offshoot of the merger of Home Economics Education, Normal Training Department and Trade Courses Program.

In 1935 – 1936, the Pangasinan High School and the Pangasinan Vocational High School were fused into one high school known as the Pangasinan Secondary School.

In 1939 – 1940, the Pangasinan Vocational High School became known as Pangasinan Trade School, an entirely separate entity from the Pangasinan High School of which it has earlier been a part.

On August 15, 1945, the Pangasinan Trade School was temporarily opened at Dagupan City due to the construction of the buildings in Lingayen.

On March 14, 1953, by virtue of Republic Act 704, the Pangasinan Trade School was converted into a National School of Arts and Trades and named as Pangasinan School of Arts and Trades (PSAT) whose curricular offerings were expanded to include Master of Arts in Vocational Technical Education, major in Practical Arts. This gave PSAT the distinction of being the only vocational school offering graduate studies, in Region I.

In 1987, the offering of post-secondary technical-vocational education was retrieved from the Pangasinan State University which brought with it all post-secondary courses upon its conversion as a state university in 1978 and only the secondary courses were left with PSAT.

In 1990, PSAT was elevated as a Higher Technical Education institution by virtue of Republic Act 7078.

In 1995, PSAT was transferred t the administrative supervision of the Commission on Higher Education (CHED) by virtue o Republic Act 7845. It was, however, only in 1997 that PSAT became a full-fledged CSI (CHED-Supervised Institution).

On April 25, 2000, by virtue of CHED-TESDA Memorandum of Agreement, PSAT was transferred to the administrative supervision of the Technical Education and Skills Development Authority (TESDA).

On May 10, 2000, the Joint CHED-TESDA Memorandum Circular No. 1, s. 2000, the Implementing Guidelines on the Transfer of CHED-Supervised Institutions (CSIs) to Technical Education and Skills Development Authority (TESDA) was issued. Dr. Geronimo S. dela Cruz Sr. was the first Vocational School Superintendent of PSAT under TESDA supervision.

On April 1, 2001, Dr. Lina C. Alcantara took over as the Officer-In-Charge. It was during her term when eleven (11) of the school offerings were registered under UTPRAS. Three courses (Garments, Computer Technician and Hotel and Restaurant Technology) were registered WTR and seven (7) courses were registered NTR.

On August 3, 2005, Manuel A. Jaramilla, Ph.D. assumed the position of Officer-In-Charge. It was during his term when Short-term courses were first offered which eventually boomed. It was also during his term when 16 courses were registered under WTR status in June, 2007. Technology Trainers were also granted Trainers’ Qualification I (TQ I) in support of the Competency Based Training Delivery.

On June 1, 2008, Clemencia T. Ibarra, CSEE and Civil Service Commission Local Scholarship Program – Masteral Degree Program and University of the Philippines Scholarship recipient assumed her post as Vocational School Superintendent I.

Her leadership and administration shall anchor in the full implementation of Competency Based Training Delivery, registration of short-term courses under WTR Status, institutional application and accreditation by Asia Pacific Accreditation and Certification Commission (APACC), improvement of school facilities, Instructional and Administrative Staff Development and Welfare Benefit Program, efficiency and transparency on school's communication, financial, administrative, and supplies management, systems and processes, and institutionalization of income generating project.

== Vocational Programs ==
- Automotive Servicing NC I
- Bread and Pastry Production NC II
- Carpentry NC II
- Computer Systems Servicing NC II
- Construction Painting NC II
- Dressmaking NC II
- Electrical Installation and Maintenance NC II
- Electrical Installation and Maintenance NC III
- Electronics Products Assembly Servicing NC II
- Food and Beverage Services NC II
- Front Office Services NC II
- Hairdressing NC II
- PV Systems Installation NC
- Production of High-Quality Inbred Rice and Seed Certification, And Farm Mechanization
- Assembly Of Solar Nightlight and Post Lamp
- Housekeeping NC II
- Masonry NC II
- Motorcycle/Small Engine Servicing NC II
- Organic Agriculture Production NC II
- Scaffolding NC II
- Shielded Metal Arc Welding NC I
- Shielded Metal Arc Welding NC II
- Trainers Methodology Level I
- Tile Setting NC II

== Diploma Programs ==
- Hotel And Restaurant Technology
- Electrical Engineering Technology
