= League of Municipalities of the Philippines =

Philippine organization

League of Municipalities
- Liga ng mga Munisipalidad
- Headquarters: 2nd Flr. LMP Bldg, 265 Ermin Garcia St., Cubao, Quezon City, Philippines
- Members: 1,493
- National president: Faustino A. Dy V
- Website: www.lmp.org.ph

The League of Municipalities of the Philippines - or more simply the League of Municipalities or LMP - is a formal organization of all the municipalities in the Philippines. Presently, one thousand four hundred eighty municipalities are part of this organization.

== Statutory Basis ==
Its creation and purpose is mandated by Section 496 of the Republic Act 7160, otherwise known as the Local Government Code of 1991, as amended, which states:

There shall be an organization of all municipalities to be known as league of municipalities for the primary purpose of ventilating, articulating and crystallizing issues affecting municipal government administration, and securing, through proper and legal means, solutions thereto.

== Representation ==
Each municipality is represented in the League by their municipal mayor. In case of his absence or incapacity, the vice mayor or a sanggunian member of the municipality shall be its representative after being elected for this purpose by its members.

== Chapters ==
The League is organized into provincial and national chapters. Every chapter has the following set of officers:

- President
- Vice President
- Board of directors

The board of directors has the power to create any other position needed to properly manage their respective chapter.

A secretary-general is chosen from among the national league members and is tasked to manage the daily activities of the national league.

== Powers, Functions, and Duties ==
Section 498 of the Local Government Code of 1991 outlines the following powers, functions and duties of the League:

- Assist the national government in the formulation and implementation of the policies, programs and projects affecting municipalities as a whole;
- Promote local autonomy at the municipal level;
- Adopt measures for the promotion of the welfare of all municipalities and its officials and employees;
- Encourage people's participation in local government administration in order to promote united and concerted action for the attainment of country-wide development goals;
- Supplement the efforts of the national government in creating opportunities for gainful employment within the municipalities;
- Give priority to programs designed for the total development of the municipalities in consonance with the policies, programs and projects of the national government;
- Serve as a forum for crystallizing and expressing ideas, seeking the necessary assistance of the national government, and providing the private sector avenues for cooperation in the promotion of the welfare of the municipalities; and
- Exercise such other powers and perform such other duties and functions as the league may prescribe for the welfare of the municipalities.

== Funding ==
The league is funded by contributions of its member local government units and/or by any fund raising activity that they organize. These funds shall be deposited to the treasurer as trust funds and is subjected to pertinent accounting and auditing rules. Chapter funds are considered separated and distinct from National funds.
