= San Manuel, Pangasinan =

Municipality in Pangasinan, Philippines

San Manuel
- Municipality
- Municipality of San Manuel
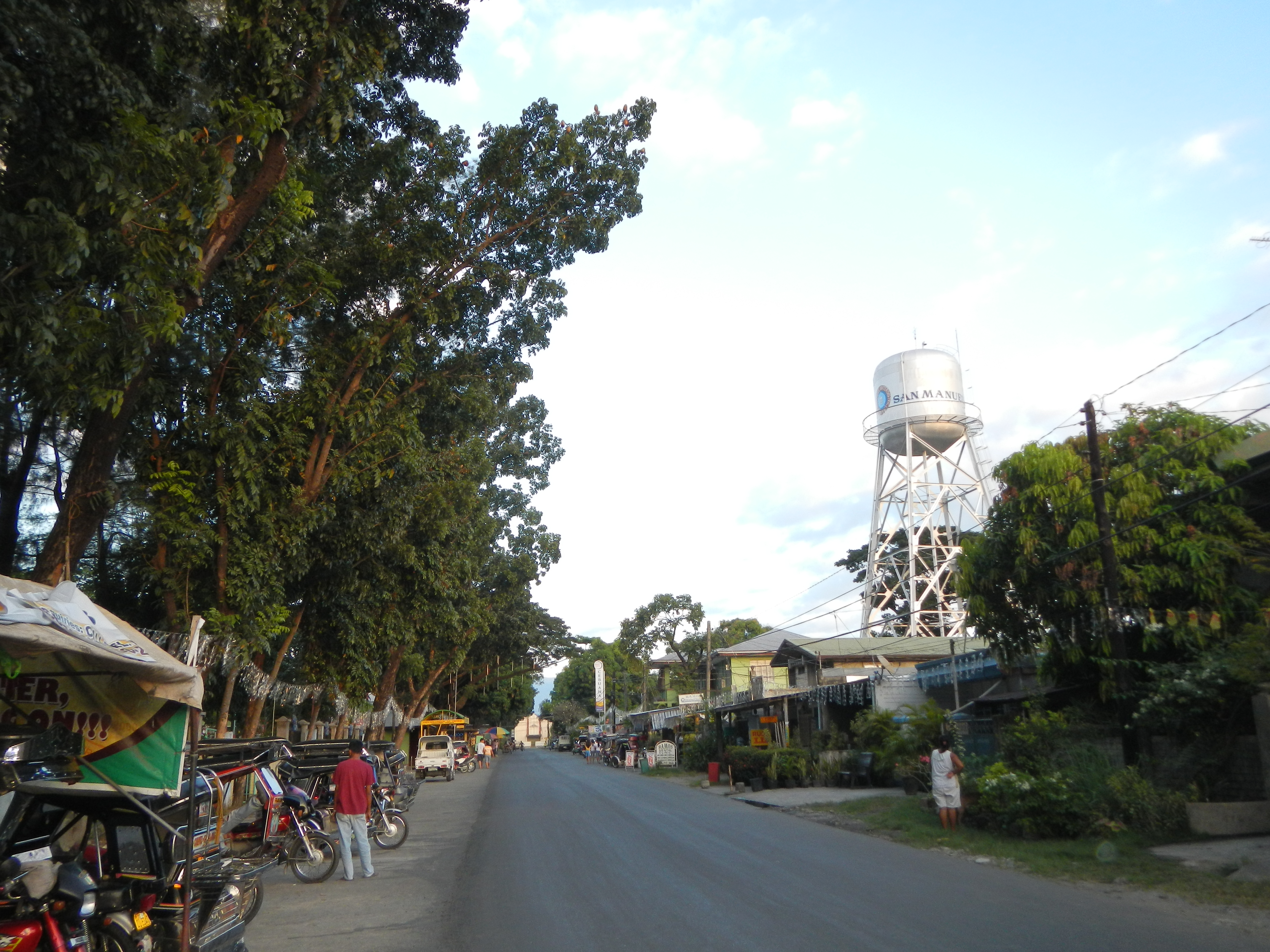
- Street in San Miguel

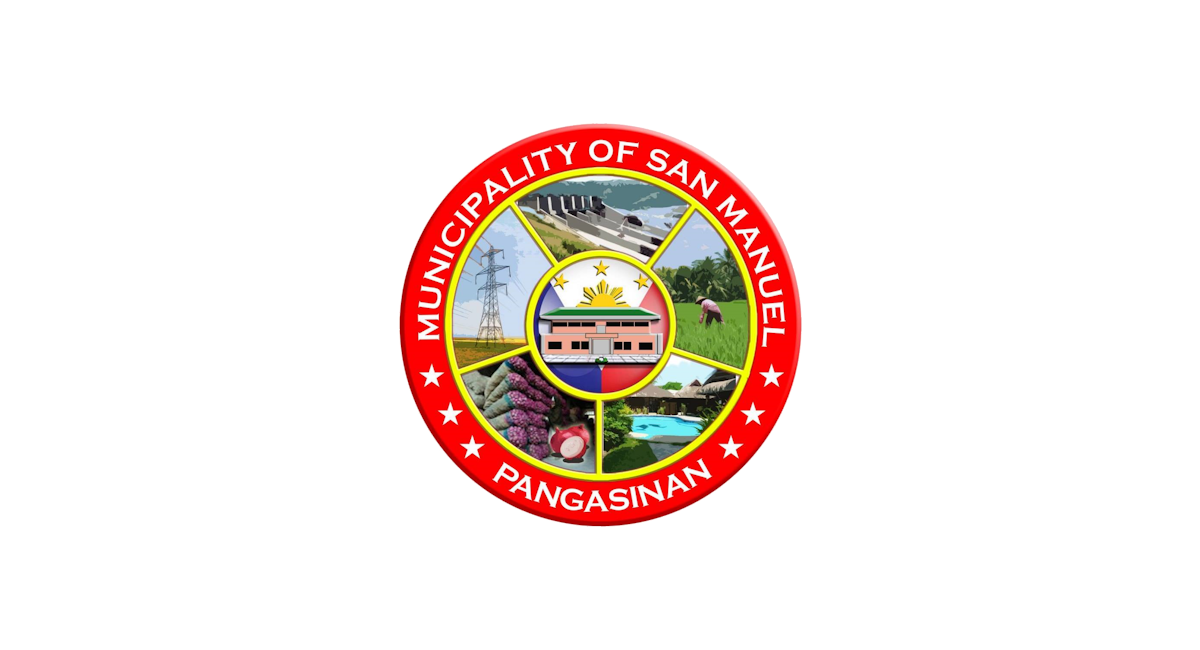
- Flag Seal

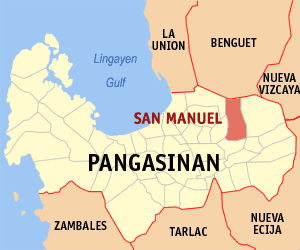
- Map of Pangasinan with San Manuel highlighted
- Interactive map of San Manuel
- Location within the Philippines
- Coordinates: 16°03′56″N 120°40′00″E
- Country: Philippines
- Region: Ilocos Region
- Province: Pangasinan
- District: 6th district
- Founded: 1614
- Re-establishment: 1860
- Annexation to Asingan: October 8, 1903
- Chartered: October 31, 1906
- Barangays: 14 (see Barangays)

Government
  - Type: Sangguniang Bayan
  - Mayor: Kenneth Marco S. Perez
  - Vice Mayor: Alain Jerico S. Perez
  - Representative: Marlyn Primicias-Agabas
  - Municipal Council: Members: Sheila Marie S. Perez; Mario D. Farro; Janet M. Cauton; Milton M. Abades; Elizabeth D. Morden; Daisy M. Barrameda; Danilo S. Sabater; Paul M. Torino
  - Electorate: 31,895 voters (2025)

Area
  - Total: 129.18 km^{2} (49.88 sq mi)
- Elevation: 78 m (256 ft)
- Highest elevation: 426 m (1,398 ft)
- Lowest elevation: 39 m (128 ft)

Population (2024 census)
  - Total: 56,876
  - Density: 440.28/km^{2} (1,140.3/sq mi)
  - Households: 14,029

Economy
  - Income class: 1st municipal income class
  - Poverty incidence: 11.27% (2023)
  - Revenue: ₱ 333.1 million (2024)
  - Assets: ₱ 676.5 million (2024)
  - Expenditure: ₱ 287.4 million (2024)

Service provider
  - Electricity: Dagupan Electric Corporation (DECORP)
- Time zone: UTC+8 (PST)
- ZIP code: 2438
- PSGC: 0105535000
- IDD : area code: +63 (0)75
- Native languages: Pangasinan; Ilocano; Tagalog

San Manuel, officially the Municipality of San Manuel (Pangasinan: Baley na San Manuel; Ilocano: Ili ti San Manuel; Tagalog: Bayan ng San Manuel), is a municipality in the province of Pangasinan, Philippines. According to the 2024 census, it has a population of 56,876 people.

== Etymology ==
The town was named by Don Manuel Sequig upon its foundation in 1614. Its Poblacion was in Pau (now Curibetbet) and had a population of 2,023.

== History ==
In 1688, the Convento was erected and in 1720, both the church and convent were in place at Pau but were burned down due to a bad omen superstition, hence Asingan fused San Manuel was but natives moved Guiset, a name of San Manuel (great bamboo thickets). In 1860, San Manuel was decreed a town for the second time.

On October 8, 1903, San Manuel, alongside barrio San Andres in Tayug, was annexed to Asingan, by virtue of Act No. 931. It was later re-established as a separate municipality on October 31, 1906, by virtue of Act No. 1556.

=== Incident ===
On September 12, 2012, gun-for-hire suspect Marcelino Cardinas Jr. (alias Jun Fabro, from Barangay Botobot Norte, Balaoan, La Union) was arrested on the Case Unclosed twin murders of San Manuel Vice Mayor Bonifacio Apilado in Urdaneta on June 20, 2007, and engineer Christopher Alfonso on August 21, 2011. Regional Trial Court Judge Joven Costales of Branch 45, Urdaneta City issued the warrant of arrest for Renato Tarinay Jr. and Cardinas. Cardinas was arrested in the house of Leonardo Sol, Sol Group leader of a Private Armed Group (PAG) in Barangay Flores, San Manuel town

In Barangay Gueset Norte, San Manuel, Pangasinan, Romero Gorospe, 40 Narra Tricycle Driver-Operators Association President and bodyguard of San Manuel mayoral bet and retired Vice Admiral Virgilio Q. Marcelo was ambushed, while Ruth Palip and Rosalinda Calip also died while crossing the street on April 19, 2010.

== Geography ==
The Municipality of San Manuel, is a municipality located in the eastern part of the province of Pangasinan, Philippines. It shares boundaries with several neighboring areas including the Cordillera mountain range to the north, the municipality of Tuba in Benguet to the northeast, and the Pangasinan municipalities of Pozorrubio, San Nicolas, Asingan, Tayug, and Binalonan. San Manuel covers a total land area of approximately 183.39 square meters (1,974.0 sq ft).

San Manuel is situated 58.49 kilometers (36.34 mi) from the provincial capital Lingayen, and 199.38 kilometers (123.89 mi) from the country's capital city of Manila.

=== Barangays ===
San Manuel is politically subdivided into 14 barangays. Each barangay consists of puroks and some have sitios.

- San Antonio-Arzadon
- Cabacaraan
- Cabaritan
- Flores
- Guiset Norte (Poblacion)
- Guiset Sur (Poblacion)
- Lapalo
- Nagsaag
- Narra
- San Bonifacio
- San Juan
- San Roque
- San Vicente
- Sto. Domingo

=== Climate ===
Climate data for San Manuel, Pangasinan
Month	Jan	Feb	Mar	Apr	May	Jun	Jul	Aug	Sep	Oct	Nov	Dec	Year
Mean daily maximum °C (°F)	31 (88)	31 (88)	32 (90)	34 (93)	35 (95)	34 (93)	32 (90)	32 (90)	32 (90)	32 (90)	32 (90)	31 (88)	32 (90)
Mean daily minimum °C (°F)	22 (72)	22 (72)	22 (72)	24 (75)	24 (75)	24 (75)	24 (75)	24 (75)	24 (75)	23 (73)	23 (73)	22 (72)	23 (74)
Average precipitation mm (inches)	13.6 (0.54)	10.4 (0.41)	18.2 (0.72)	15.7 (0.62)	178.4 (7.02)	227.9 (8.97)	368 (14.5)	306.6 (12.07)	310.6 (12.23)	215.7 (8.49)	70.3 (2.77)	31.1 (1.22)	1,766.5 (69.56)
Average rainy days	3	2	2	4	14	16	23	21	24	15	10	6	140
Source: World Weather Online

== Demographics ==
Population census of San Manuel
Year	Pop.	±% p.a.
1903	7,784	—
1918	12,244	+3.07%
1939	15,622	+1.17%
1948	15,376	−0.18%
1960	20,959	+2.61%
1970	26,357	+2.32%
1975	27,555	+0.90%
1980	29,622	+1.46%
1990	35,490	+1.82%
1995	36,392	+0.47%
2000	41,206	+2.70%
2007	46,769	+1.76%
2010	46,875	+0.08%
2015	52,939	+2.34%
2020	54,271	+0.52%
2024	56,876	+1.13%
Source: Philippine Statistics Authority

=== Language ===
San Manuel natives speak mostly Ilocano. English and Filipino are spoken as well.

=== Religion ===
Every barangay has a Catholic Chapel, which are maintained by the Lay Ministers Of St. Bartholomew Parish Church- Located in the town proper of San Manuel.

==== St. Bartholomew Parish Church ====
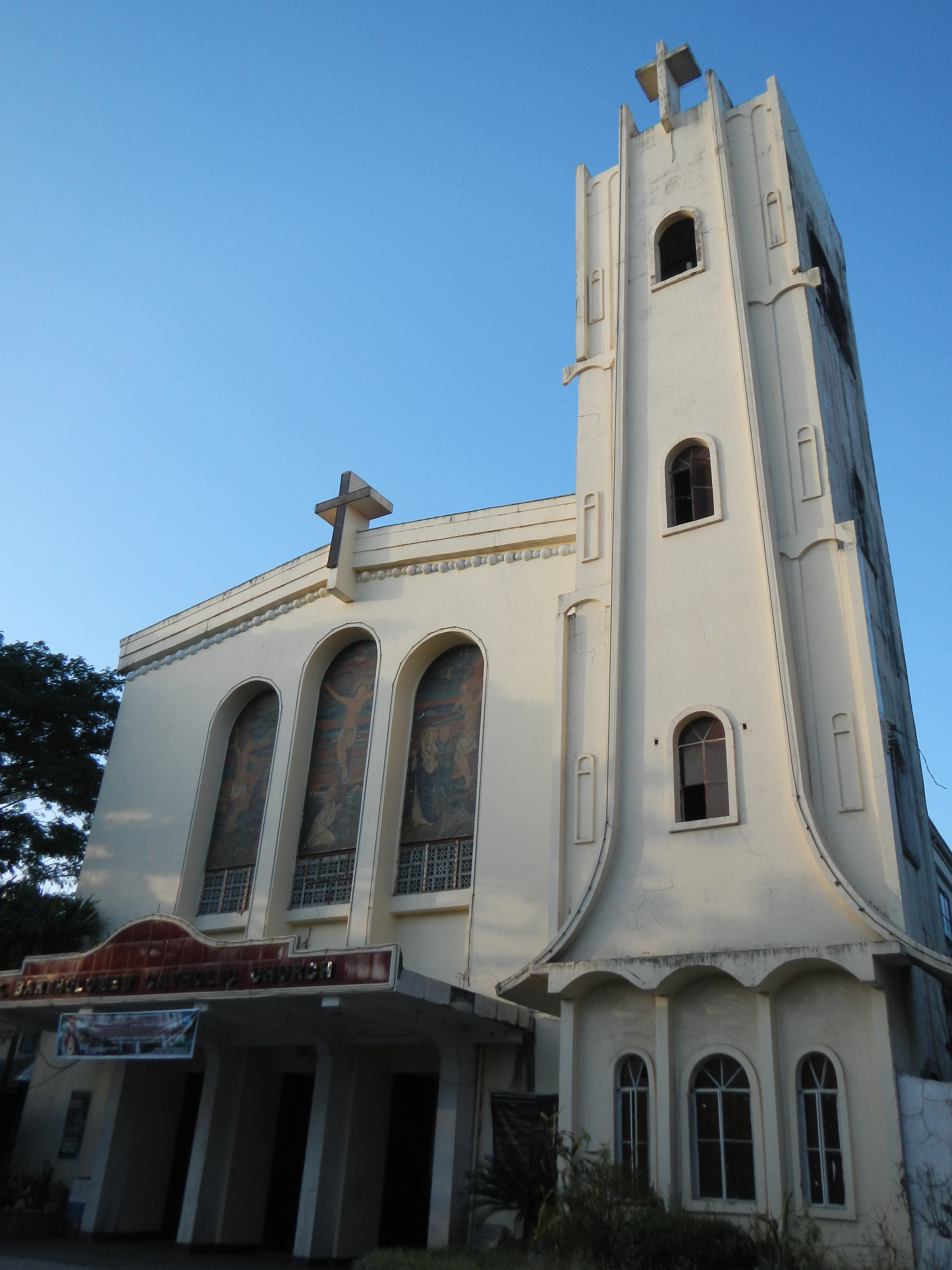
St. Bartholomew Parish Church

The 1687 St. Bartholomew Parish Church (Rizal, San Manuel, 2438 Central Pangasinan) is under the jurisdiction of the Roman Catholic Archdiocese of Lingayen-Dagupan, Roman Catholic Diocese of Urdaneta.

Its Feast Day is August 24, with Parish Priest, Father Diomedes S. Laguerta, Guest Priest, Father Rafael T. Cruz and Vicar Forane, Father Elpidio F. Silva Jr.

San Manuel first existed in barrio Pao (now Bato) in 1614, while the first church was built in Pao in 1688, which was burned in 1720, due to superstition. Hence, the natives heard Mass at Sinapug, name of Asingan.

Accepted in 1860, San Manuel became a House of the Dominican Order in 1878, per Royal Decree of July 6, 1878, an independent parish from Asingan. The first “ermita” of the town was erected with the help of the faithful by Kura Paroko, Fr. Bonifacio Provanza built the first "ermita" or Bisita in 1882, with a cruciform. Fr. Jose Ma. Puente continued the construction and on October 1, 1894, a great whirlwind destroyed the ermita which was rebuilt by Fr, Fuente adding the convent. The 1898 revolutionaries destroyed the Church. Fr. Probanza built a small convent and the old church was about 100 meter long and 20 meters wide.

The second dominant church is The Iglesia Ni Cristo, in the south of the town proper, and five barangay chapels, accounting for 2-3% of faithfuls in the municipality.

There are other religious groups with fewer members.

== Economy ==
Poverty incidence of San Manuel (%)

Source: Philippine Statistics Authority

== Tourism ==
San Manuel has the following attractions and interesting points:

- NGCP's San Manuel street-lighting project: the National Grid Corporation of the Philippines (NGCP) electrified San Manuel from Nagsaag Extra-High Voltage (EHV) substation down to Asuncion Street. per Chief Administrative Officer Anthony L. Almeda and San Manuel Mayor Alain Jerico S. Perez MOA. San Manuel, Pangasinan hosts NGCP's District 3 Office, the San Manuel Substation, and the Extra High Voltage Station and transmission lines.
- Fiesta yearly, March 8–15. Padanom Festival
- Butao Springs : A&E spring resort at Butao. Botao Spring Resort: a scenic picnic background, virtual oasis with 5 swimming pools, shady areas, spring water and 3-room cottage. Villa Felisa Spring Resort a hidden place to enjoy peaceful and scenic view to relaxed from busy urban life.
- San Roque Multi-Purpose Power Plant - San Roque Dam (Philippines) is the second largest dam in Asia.

It is Asia's tallest dam and largest private hydropower project, costing US$1.19 billion and generating 345 MW of power.

- On May 11, 2012, granite "Walk of Fame" Memorial was unveiledd: Names of San Manuel Leaders, Mayors and notable residents were inscribed at the very long Marker in front of the Municipio or Town hall .
- Feast of Saint Bartholomew - month of October.
- Historical Marker of 1886 Municipio Municipal (Capitan Toribio Diccion: burned, 1943 WWII; in 1934, Mayor Primitivo S. Perez, Marker and Flag Pole & 1979, Mayor Laureano S. Perez)
- 1927 Memorial "Veteranos de la Revoucion": Kapitan Juan P. Marquez & Sarhento Cornelio Ines (1898 Fort of Bolangit)

== Government ==
=== Local government ===
San Manuel is part of the sixth congressional district of the province of Pangasinan. It is governed by a mayor, designated as its local chief executive, and by a municipal council as its legislative body in accordance with the Local Government Code. The mayor, vice mayor, and the councilors are elected directly by the people through an election which is being held every three years.

=== Elected officials ===
Kenneth Marco Sison Perez serves as Mayor of San Manuel, while his brother the Honorable Alain Jerico Sison Perez serves as Vice Mayor. Previously, the Honorable Salvador M. Perez, their father, served as Vice Mayor to Alain Perez when he was Mayor, after the elder Perez served as Mayor himself.

Members of the Municipal Council (2019–2022)
Position	Name
Congressman	Tyrone D. Agabas
Mayor	Kenneth Marco S. Perez
Vice-Mayor	Alain Jerico S. Perez
Councilors	Sheila Marie S. Perez
Councilors	Mario D. Farro
Councilors	Janet M. Cauton
Councilors	Milton M. Abades
Councilors	Elizabeth D. Morden
Councilors	Daisy M. Barrameda
Councilors	Danilo S. Sabater
Councilors	Ragsac C. de Leon

=== Political clans ===
The Perez family has long held mayoralty post over four generations, including Laureano (Kenneth Marco's grandfather) from 1964–1980 and 1981–1985 and Don Primitivo (Kenneth Marco's great-grandfather) from 1934–1940 and 1956–1963. The Mayor holds office at the Session Hall which is located at the Legislative Building.

== Education ==
The San Manuel Schools District Office governs all educational institutions within the municipality. It oversees the management and operations of all private and public, from primary to secondary schools.

St. Mary's Dominican School is the first and only private Catholic School in the town. It was established by the late Fr. Mendoza and handed over to the Dominican Sisters ( O.P.).

Mataas na Paaralang Juan C. Laya (MPJCL) is the largest public secondary school of the town. It was the home to thousand of students coming from different barangays of the town. It was named after the late Juan C. Laya (1911-1952), a distinguished writer and educator. Juan Cabreros Laya (Filipino novelist, publisher and awardee of a Commonwealth prize for his English novel "His Native Land") is the founder of Inang Lupa publishing and was active in textbook in the 1950s.

Blessed Angel Achievers Academy is a new established private school in the area.

On 15 December 2012, For. Tom Valdez, SRPC vice president of San Roque Power Corp (SRPC), operator of the San Roque Multi-purpose Project including the Dam, opened its Education Governance Programs (with Synergeia Foundation) for San Manuel and San Nicolas in Pangasinan and Itogon in Benguet - the communities housing San Roque Dam. Main features are the day-care center and the Laklak creek retaining wall in Barangay Camangaan, repair of 5-classroom building in Barangay Bobon and building of one-classroom building each for barangays Bomboaya and Don Cristobal.

=== Primary and elementary schools ===
- An-Anonas Elementary School
- Arzadon Elementary School
- Bobon Elementary School
- Bomboaya Elementary School
- Cabacaraan Elementary School
- Cabaritan Elementary School
- Florencio P. Guzon Elementary School
- Juan C. Laya Central School SPED Center
- Laclac Chayao School
- Lapalo Elementary School
- Lomboy Elementary School
- Nagsaag Elementary School
- San Antonio Elementary School
- San Bonifacio Elementary School
- San Juan Elementary School
- San Vicente East Elementary School
- San Vicente West Elementary School
- Silsilay Elementary School
- Sto. Domingo Elementary School
- Tacnien Elementary School

=== Secondary schools ===
- Don Robert B. Estrella, Sr. National High School
- Flores Integrated School
- Mataas Na Paaralang Juan C. Laya
- Narra Integrated School
- San Juan National High School
- San Roque Integrated School
- Sto. Domingo National High School

== Gallery ==
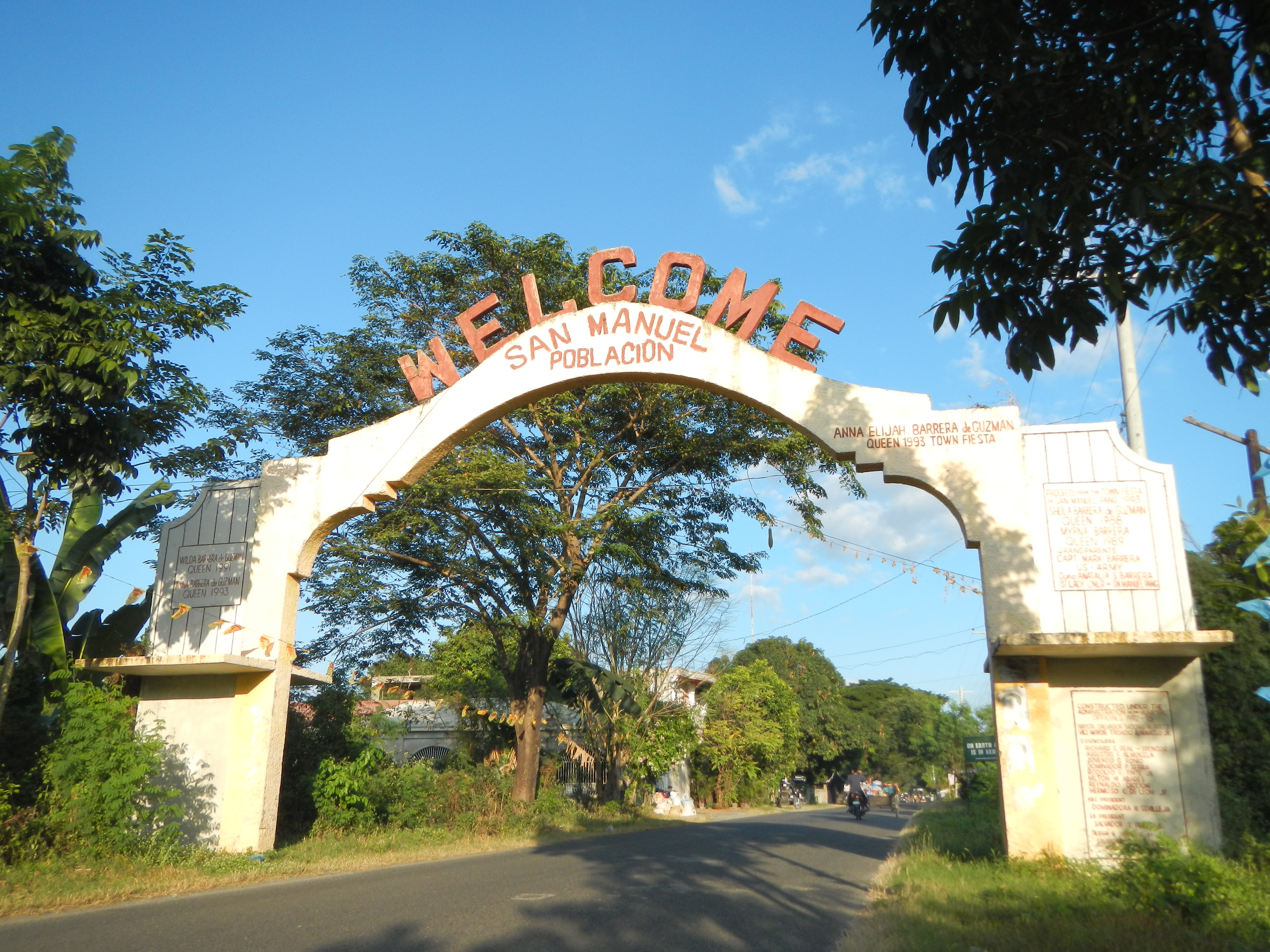
Welcome marker

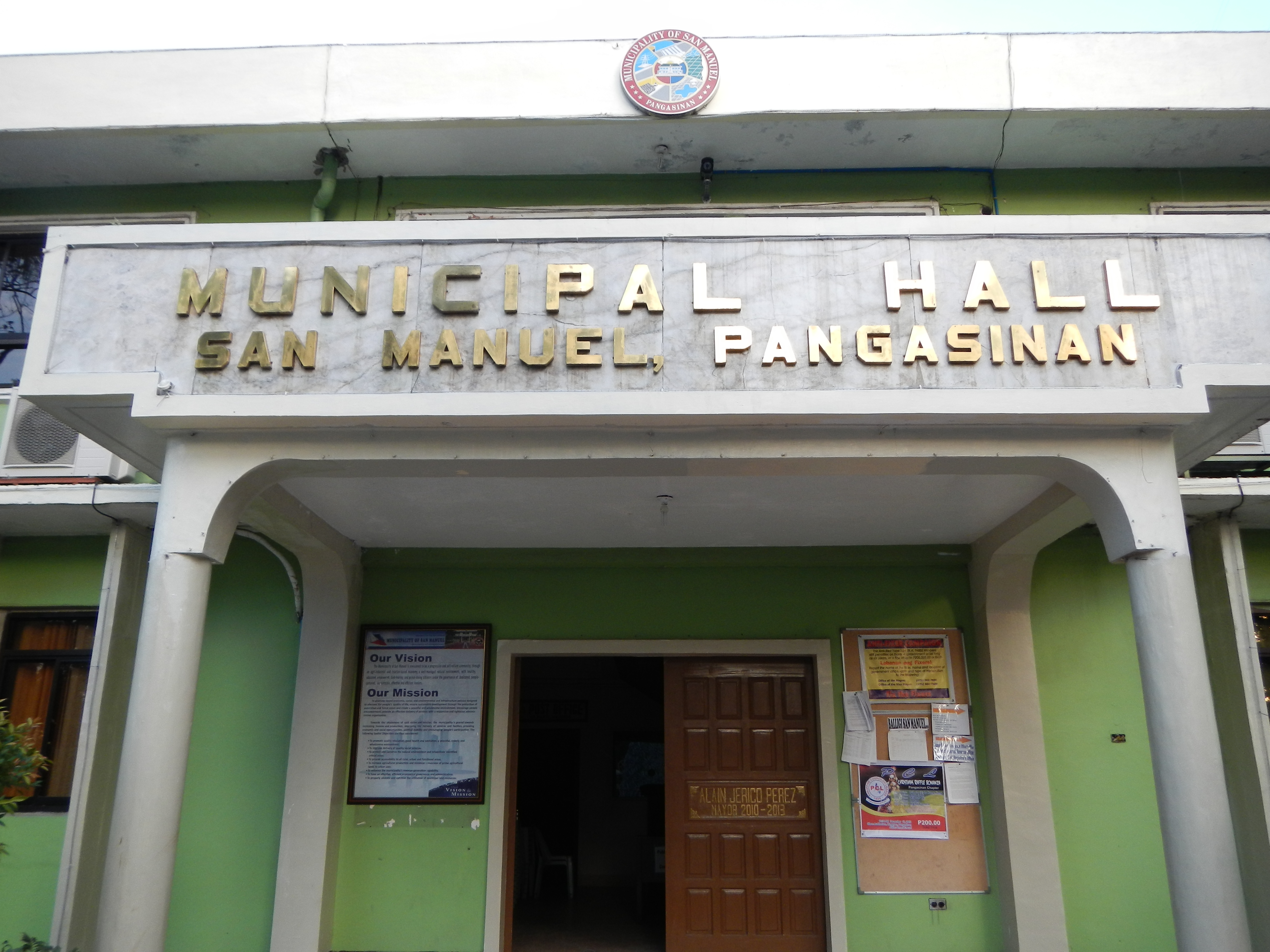
Municipal Hall of San Manuel

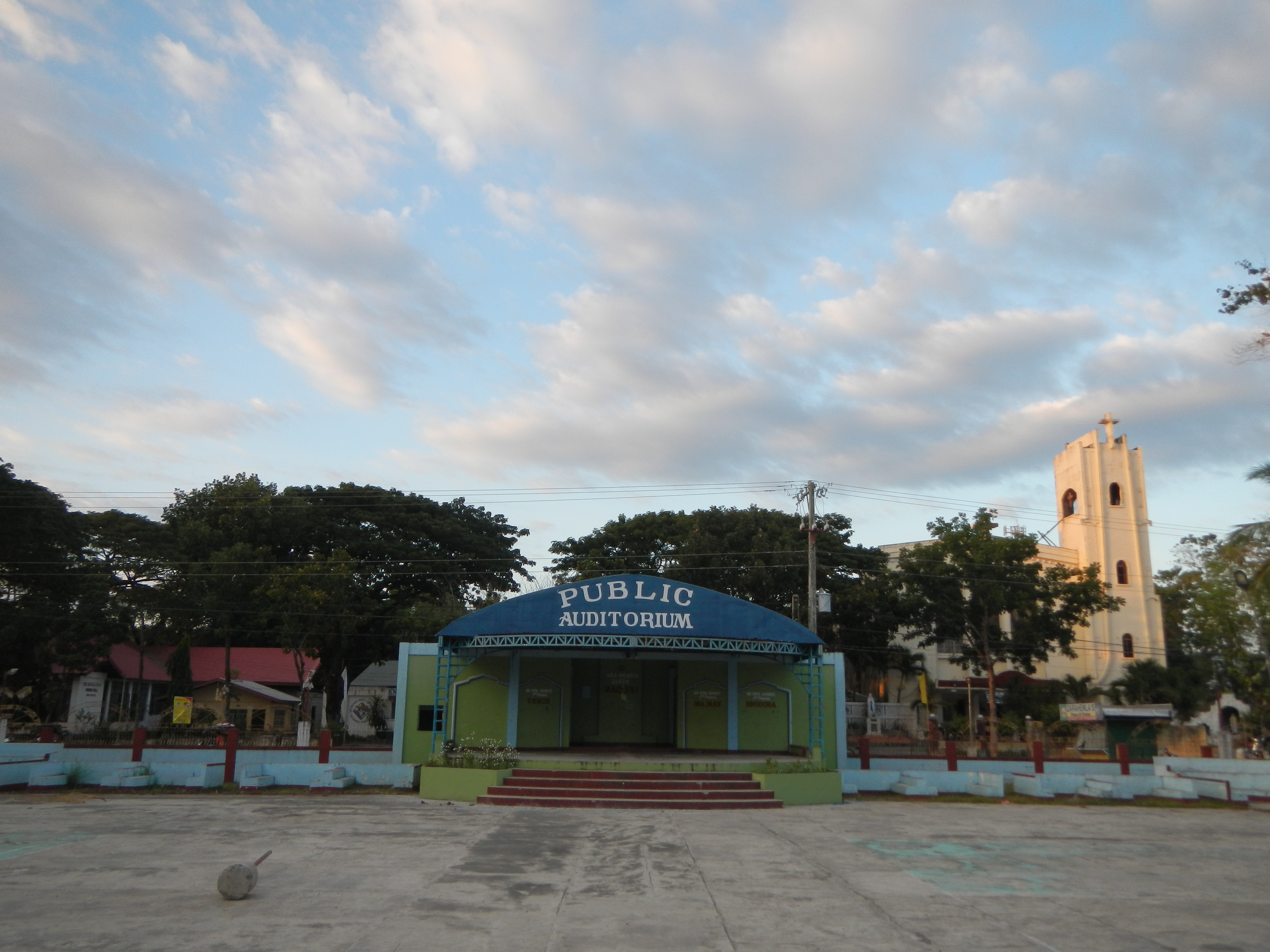
Public Auditorium

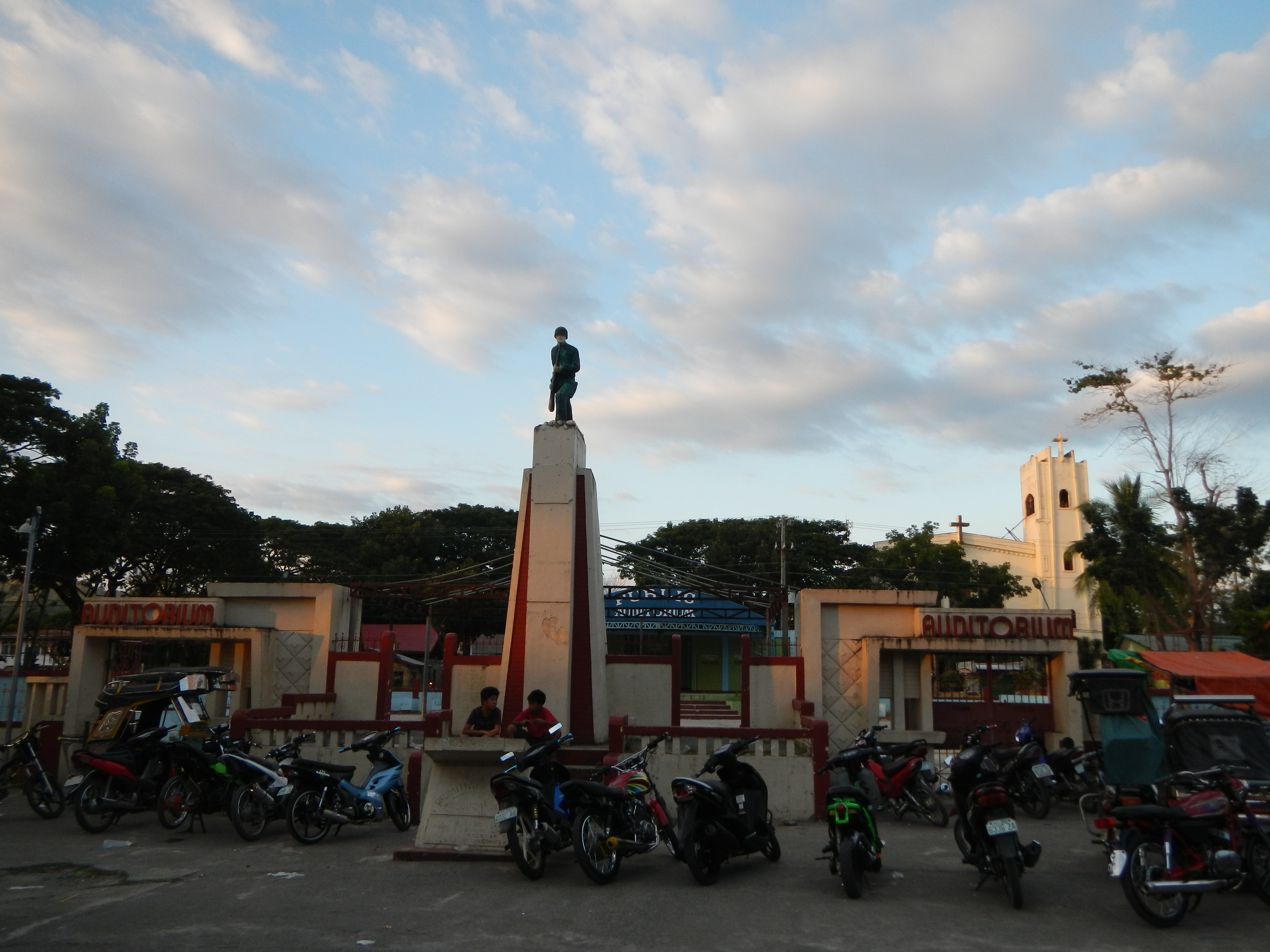
Park and the Church

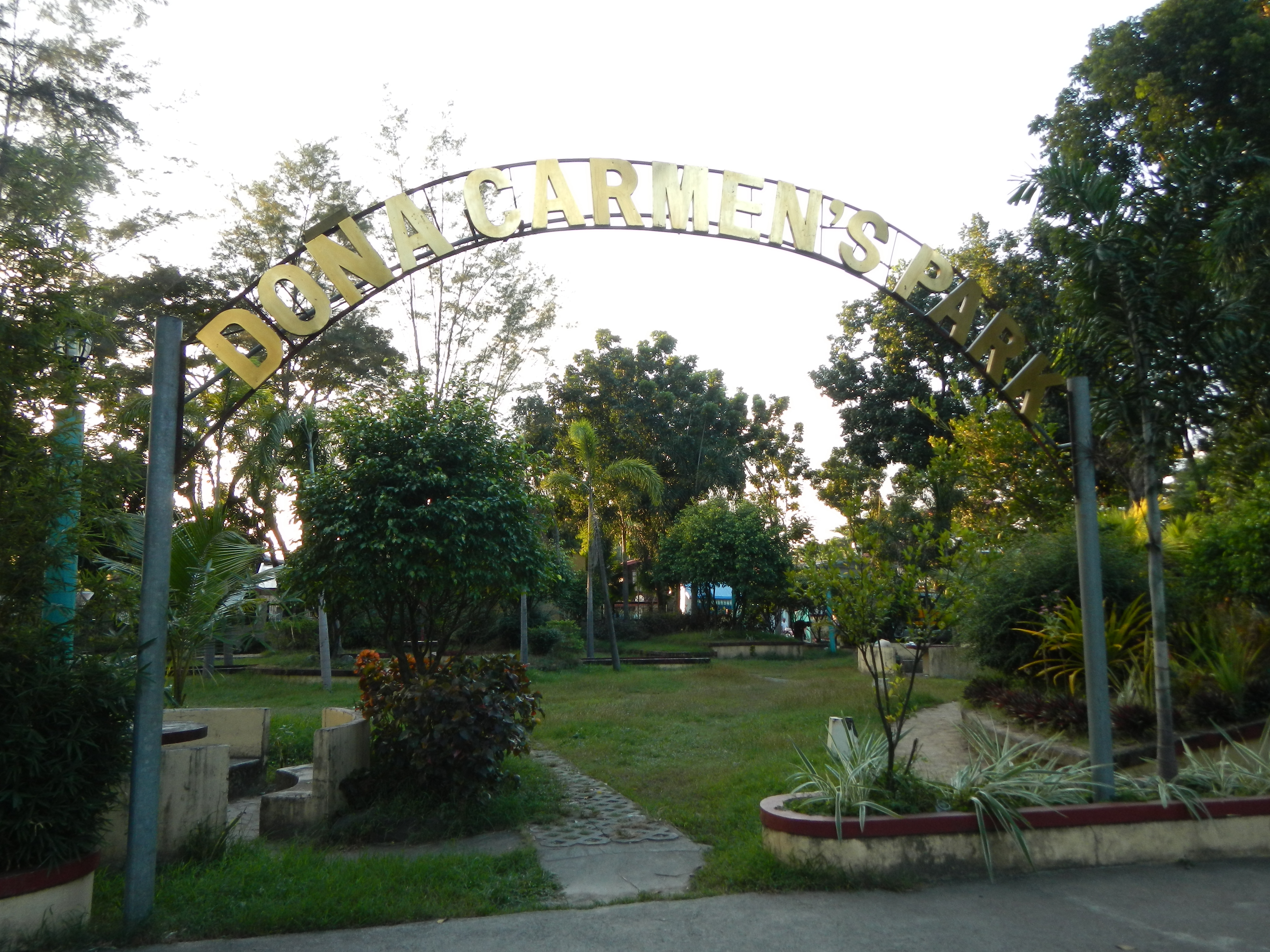
Dona Carmen's Park

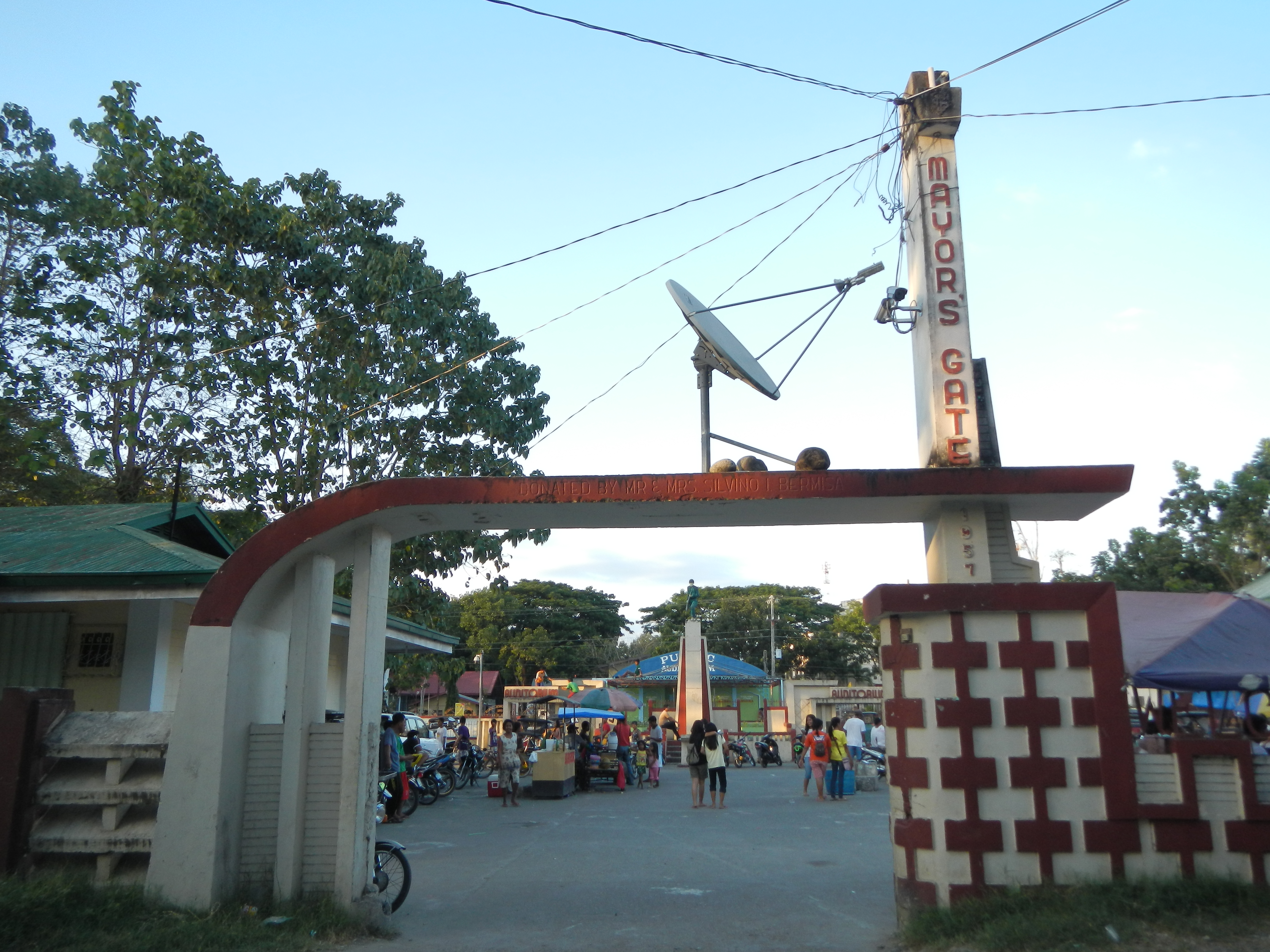
Mayor's Gate
