= List of Cultural Properties of the Philippines in Lingayen, Pangasinan =

This is a list of cultural properties in Lingayen, a municipality in the province of Pangasinan on the island of Luzon in the Philippines.

Cultural Property wmph identifier (Note: wmph is an internal identifier used by Wikimedia Philippines to identify the monument. This is not an official identifier, and only shown temporarily in the templates until the government creates an updated complete list.)	Site name	Description	Province	City or municipality	Address	Coordinates	Image
	Epiphany of Our Lord Parish	One of the oldest Churches in Pangasinan, founded in 1587 by the Augustinian Missionaries.	Pangasinan	Lingayen, Pangasinan	Avenida Rizal East Road	16°01′19″N 120°13′53″E	Upload file
	Corpuz House	constructed in 1945	Pangasinan	Lingayen, Pangasinan	46 Primicia Street	16°01′45″N 120°13′57″E	Upload file
	Ramos House	Replica of the original house (destroyed during World War II and rebuilt in 1995) where former President Fidel V. Ramos was born.	Pangasinan	Lingayen, Pangasinan		16°01′46″N 120°13′56″E	Upload file
	Unknown Ancestral House		Pangasinan	Lingayen, Pangasinan	33 Primicia Street	16°01′45″N 120°13′56″E	Upload file
	Cruz House	Constructed in between 1920s - 1930s	Pangasinan	Lingayen, Pangasinan	31 Primicia Street	16°01′45″N 120°13′56″E	Upload file
	Unknown Ancestral House		Pangasinan	Lingayen, Pangasinan	32 Primicia Street	16°01′44″N 120°13′55″E	Upload file
	Unknown Ancestral House	Constructed in 1960s	Pangasinan	Lingayen, Pangasinan	15 Primicia Street	16°01′42″N 120°13′47″E	Upload file
	Unknown Ancestral House	Constructed in 1960s	Pangasinan	Lingayen, Pangasinan	24 Primicia Street	16°01′41″N 120°13′45″E	Upload file
	Cruz House		Pangasinan	Lingayen, Pangasinan	84 Artacho Street	16°01′44″N 120°13′41″E	Upload file
	Cruz House		Pangasinan	Lingayen, Pangasinan	80 Artacho Street	16°01′44″N 120°13′41″E	Upload file
	Pangasinan Memorial College		Pangasinan	Lingayen, Pangasinan	95 Artacho Street	16°01′46″N 120°13′39″E	Upload file
	Pangasinan National High School	Formerly known as "Pangasinan Academic High School", it was established 1908 as the first public secondary school in Lingayen. In 1946, two Gabaldon Buildings were constructed (North and South Wings) and was later renamed as Pangasinan National High School.	Pangasinan	Lingayen, Pangasinan		16°01′53″N 120°13′49″E	Upload file
	Vinluan House		Pangasinan	Lingayen, Pangasinan	26 Alvear Street	16°01′47″N 120°13′37″E	Upload file
	United Methodist Church		Pangasinan	Lingayen, Pangasinan	27 Alvear East Street	16°01′47″N 120°13′36″E	Upload file
	Cruz House	Constructed in 1950s	Pangasinan	Lingayen, Pangasinan	46 Alvear Street	16°01′45″N 120°13′29″E	Upload file
	Felisa Dela Cruz-Sison House	Constructed in 1940s	Pangasinan	Lingayen, Pangasinan			Upload file
	Josefina Cruz House	Constructed in 1950s	Pangasinan	Lingayen, Pangasinan			Upload file
	Conrado G. Sison House	Constructed in 1960s	Pangasinan	Lingayen, Pangasinan			Upload file
	Josefina De Guzman-Tomelden House		Pangasinan	Lingayen, Pangasinan			Upload file
	Bonifacio House	Constructed in 1930s	Pangasinan	Lingayen, Pangasinan			Upload file
	Sison Compound		Pangasinan	Lingayen, Pangasinan			Upload file
	Sylveria Ocampo House		Pangasinan	Lingayen, Pangasinan			Upload file
	Adriano Bandong House	Constructed in 1956	Pangasinan	Lingayen, Pangasinan			Upload file
	Florencio Tandoc House	Constructed in 1950s	Pangasinan	Lingayen, Pangasinan			Upload file
	Marcelino Aquino House	Constructed in 1960s	Pangasinan	Lingayen, Pangasinan			Upload file
	Lingayen Roman Catholic Cemetery		Pangasinan	Lingayen, Pangasinan		16°01′55″N 120°13′26″E	Upload file
	Salvacion Cemetery	under the Iglesia Independiente de Filipinas	Pangasinan	Lingayen, Pangasinan	Salvacion	16°01′53″N 120°13′05″E	Upload file
	Colegio del Santissimo Rosario Ruins		Pangasinan	Lingayen, Pangasinan	Avenida Rizal West Street	16°01′16″N 120°13′24″E	Upload file
	Convent for the Priests		Pangasinan	Lingayen, Pangasinan	Avenida Rizal West Street	16°01′16″N 120°13′25″E	Upload file
	Jimenez Bridge	Constructed in 1921	Pangasinan	Lingayen, Pangasinan	Avenida Rizal West	16°01′16″N 120°13′25″E	Upload file
	Lingayen Water District	Constructed in 1940s	Pangasinan	Lingayen, Pangasinan	Avenida Rizal West	16°01′15″N 120°13′27″E	Upload file
	Bengzon House	Constructed in 1911	Pangasinan	Lingayen, Pangasinan	50 Abadilla Street	16°01′14″N 120°13′27″E	Upload file
	Unknown Ancestral House		Pangasinan	Lingayen, Pangasinan			Upload file
	Iglesia Filipina Independiente Church		Pangasinan	Lingayen, Pangasinan			Upload file
	Unknown Demolished House		Pangasinan	Lingayen, Pangasinan			Upload file
	Warehouse made of Adobe	almacén	Pangasinan	Lingayen, Pangasinan			Upload file
	Angeles Casun House		Pangasinan	Lingayen, Pangasinan			Upload file
	Samson-Bengzon Elementary School		Pangasinan	Lingayen, Pangasinan		16°01′13″N 120°13′34″E	Upload file
	Lingayen II District Social Hall		Pangasinan	Lingayen, Pangasinan			Upload file
	Padilla Central School		Pangasinan	Lingayen, Pangasinan			Upload file
	Bengzon House	Museum	Pangasinan	Lingayen, Pangasinan			Upload file
	Casa Real (Lingayen)	Constructed in 1840s and served as the former seat of the government of Pangasinan.	Pangasinan	Lingayen, Pangasinan		16°01′11″N 120°13′49″E	Upload file
	Pangasinan Provincial Jail	Established in 1934	Pangasinan	Lingayen, Pangasinan		16°01′11″N 120°13′48″E	Upload file
	United Methodist Church		Pangasinan	Lingayen, Pangasinan			Upload Photo
	Arturo Sison House		Pangasinan	Lingayen, Pangasinan	33 Gov. Antonio Sison Street		Upload Photo
	Malong Building (now Tourism Building)	Named after Andres Malong, a Pangasinense hero who led the revolt against the Spaniards from 1660 to 1661. The building was completed in 1958 and was renovated in 2008.	Pangasinan	Lingayen, Pangasinan	Capitol Complex Grounds	16°01′59″N 120°13′58″E	Upload file
	Pangasinan Provincial Capitol Building	Originally built in neo-classical style and inaugurated in 1918 and then reconstructed in 1949 after it was severely damaged during the pre-landing bombardment in 1945 by the American troops in Lingayen Gulf during World War II. It is one of the architectural treasures of the country.	Pangasinan	Lingayen, Pangasinan		16°02′01″N 120°13′53″E	Upload file
	Palaris Building	Built in 1958 and formerly known as Kalantiaw Building, it was named after Datu Kalantiaw, said to have composed the first legal code of the Philippines, the Code of Kalantiaw. The code was said to be fraudulent and Kalantiyaw was not a Pangasinense but an Aklanon, according to some historical accounts. The building was renamed Palaris, in honor of the heroic acts of Pantaleon Perez, also known as "Palaris" in leading the Pangasinense rebels from 1762-1764 against the Spaniards.	Pangasinan	Lingayen, Pangasinan	Capitol Complex Grounds	16°01′57″N 120°13′51″E	Upload file
	Urduja House	Named in honor of Urduja, the warrior princess. This is the official residence of the incumbent Governor of Pangasinan. The edifice was constructed in 1953 and named "Princess Urduja Palace" by former Governor Juan de Guzman Rodriguez. It houses the half-naked painting of Urduja by the renowned mural artist Antonio Gonzalez Dumlao.	Pangasinan	Lingayen, Pangasinan	Capitol Complex Grounds	16°02′05″N 120°13′56″E	Upload file
	Sison Auditorium	Built in Neo-classical Style, the auditorium was constructed in 1927. It was initially known as the “Grand Provincial Auditorium” in the 1930s was the popular venue for zarzuelas and other cultural performances in pre-war and early post-war period. It was later renamed after the late Governor Teofilo Sison, the first Pangasinense to become secretary of National Defense. In 2010, it had undergone a major renovation and inaugurated in the same year, April 05. At present, Sison Auditorium serves as the Cultural Center of Ilocos Region.	Pangasinan	Lingayen, Pangasinan		16°02′00″N 120°13′44″E	Upload file
