= Casa Real =

Casa Real (Spanish: royal house) may refer to:

- Casa Real (Lingayen), a public building in Pangasinan, Philippines
- Casa Real de Iloilo, a government building in Iloilo City, Philippines
- Marquisate of Casa Real, a title of Spanish nobility
- Monarchy of Spain
