= Tawalisi =

Asian kingdom claimed to have been visited by Ibn Battuta

Tawalisi (Arabic: طواليسي) is a Southeast Asian kingdom described in the journals of Ibn Battuta.

Guesses to the location of Tawalisi have included Java, Pangasinan, Luzon, Sulu, Celebes (Sulawesi), Cambodia, Cochin-China, the mainland Chinese province of Guangdong, and practically every island in South Asia beginning with ta. In the Philippines, Pangasinan was considered to be the most-likely location of Tawalisi, but this has since been disputed.

== Ibn Battuta's description ==
Thereafter, we reached the land of Tawalisi, it being their king who is called by that name. It is a vast country and its king is a rival of the king of China. He possesses many junks, with which he makes war on the Chinese until they come to terms with him on certain conditions. The inhabitants of this land are idolaters; they are handsome men and closely resemble the Turks in figure. Their skin is commonly of a reddish hue, and they are brave and warlike. Their women ride on horseback and are skillful archers, and fight exactly like men.
—Ibn Battuta

== Theories on location ==
=== Java theory ===
Java had been attacked by Mongols they called Tatars in 1293. According to friar Odoric of Pordenone, the great khan of Cathay (Yuan dynasty) attacked Java (Majapahit) many times but was always defeated. Hence, it is probable that Java at that time especially the royal court had also been linguistically influenced by the Turkic speaking Tatars. So it is possible that the Bhre Daha (the ruler of Daha) could talk in Turkic as was observed by Ibn Battuta during his visit to her court.

At the time of Ibn Battuta's journey, Majapahit was being led by Queen Tribhuwana Wijayatunggadewi. This gave rise to speculation that Urduja was Tribhuwana Wijayatunggadewi. Majapahit also possessed a powerful navy of Javanese junks (jong) during its era. Each junk is able to carry 600–1000 men, was more than 69 to 80 metres (226 to 262 ft) long, and could carry several hundred horses. The number of junks possessed by Majapahit is unknown, but the largest expedition mobilized 400 large junks. This matches the account of Odoric about the junk he boarded while traveling in Southeast Asia—which carried 700 men, and Ibn Battuta's description about Tawalisi having numerous junks that were used to fight the king of China.

=== Philippine theory ===
The location of Tawalisi, as well as the identity of its described warrior-princess Urduja, remains a part of Philippine folklore and history, in spite of the National Historical Commission of the Philippines finding the related Kalantiaw myth to be a hoax in 2005. Both the Kalantiaw and Tawalisi-Pangasinan connections were called into dispute by historian William Henry Scott, but his findings were ignored by the Marcos regime, who had codified Kalantiaw and Urduja's place in Philippine history. Due to the political nature of historical education in the Philippines, both the Urduja and Kalantiaw legends continue to be a semi-historical part of Philippine education.

Both Sir Henry Yule and William Henry Scott consider Tawilisi and its warrior-princess Urduja to be "fabulous, fairy-tale, fiction".
