= Urduja House =

- Opisyal ya Panayaman na Gobernador na Pangasinan

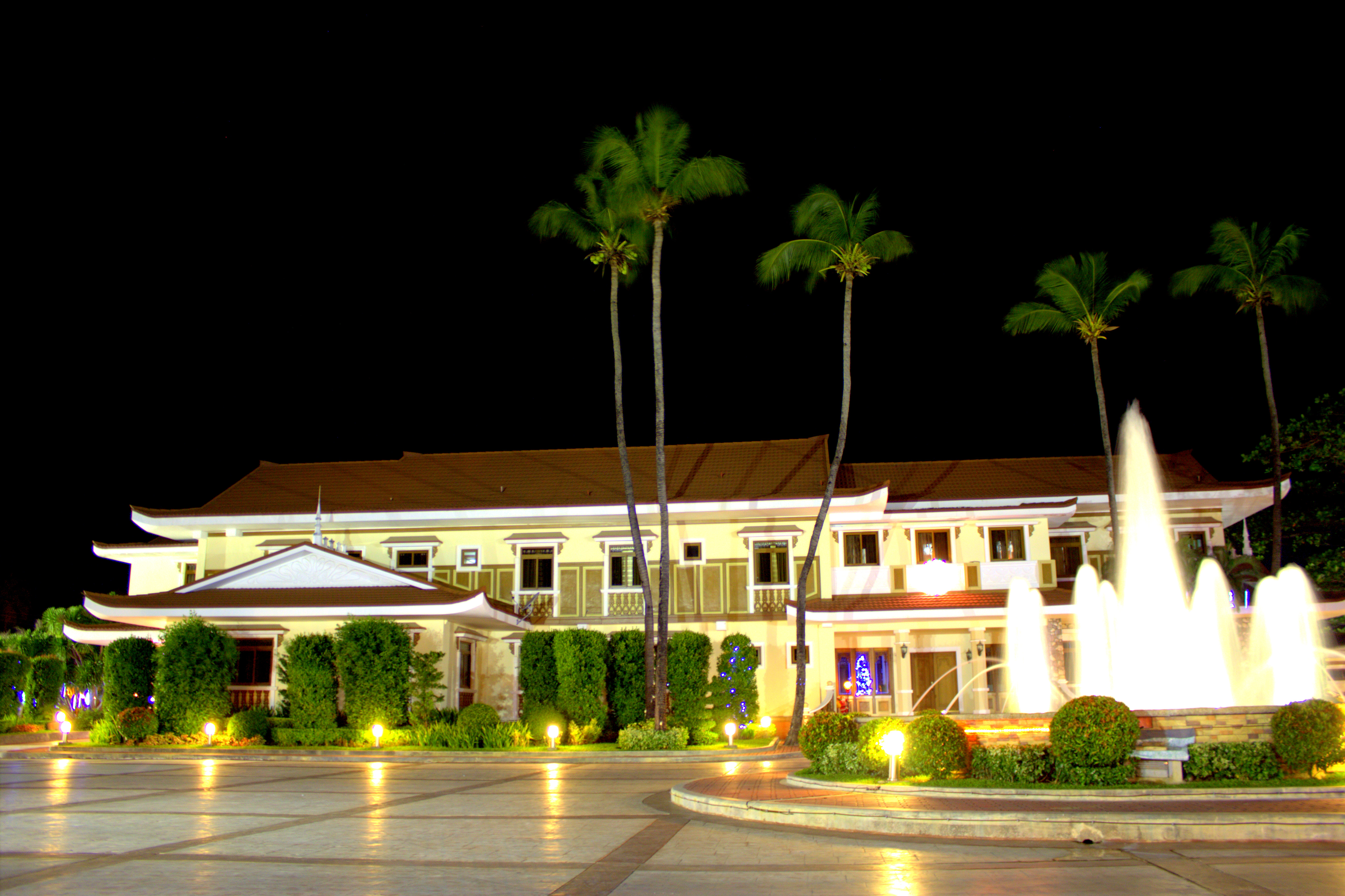
- Alternative names: Urduja Palace

General information
- Type: Residence
- Location: Pangasinan Provincial Capitol Complex, Lingayen, Pangasinan, Philippines
- Coordinates: 16°02′05″N 120°13′56″E
- Current tenants: Hon. Ramon V. Guico III
- Completed: 1953
- Renovated: 2007
- Owner: Provincial Government of Pangasinan

Urduja House, previously known as Urduja Palace, is the official residence of the governor of Pangasinan. Built across the Pangasinan Provincial Capitol in 1953, it has been home to subsequent governors as their residence while in the capital, Lingayen.

== History ==
Governor Juan Rodriguez conceived the idea of an official residence under his administration, especially since governors before him came from different parts of the province. In order to ease travel, he commissioned a governor's mansion across the Pangasinan Provincial Capitol he promptly named "Urduja Palace," named after the legendary Urduja, a princess of Tawilisi, said to be located in the present-day Pangasinan. It was officially named "Urduja House" as a simplication, since it was too small to be a palace.

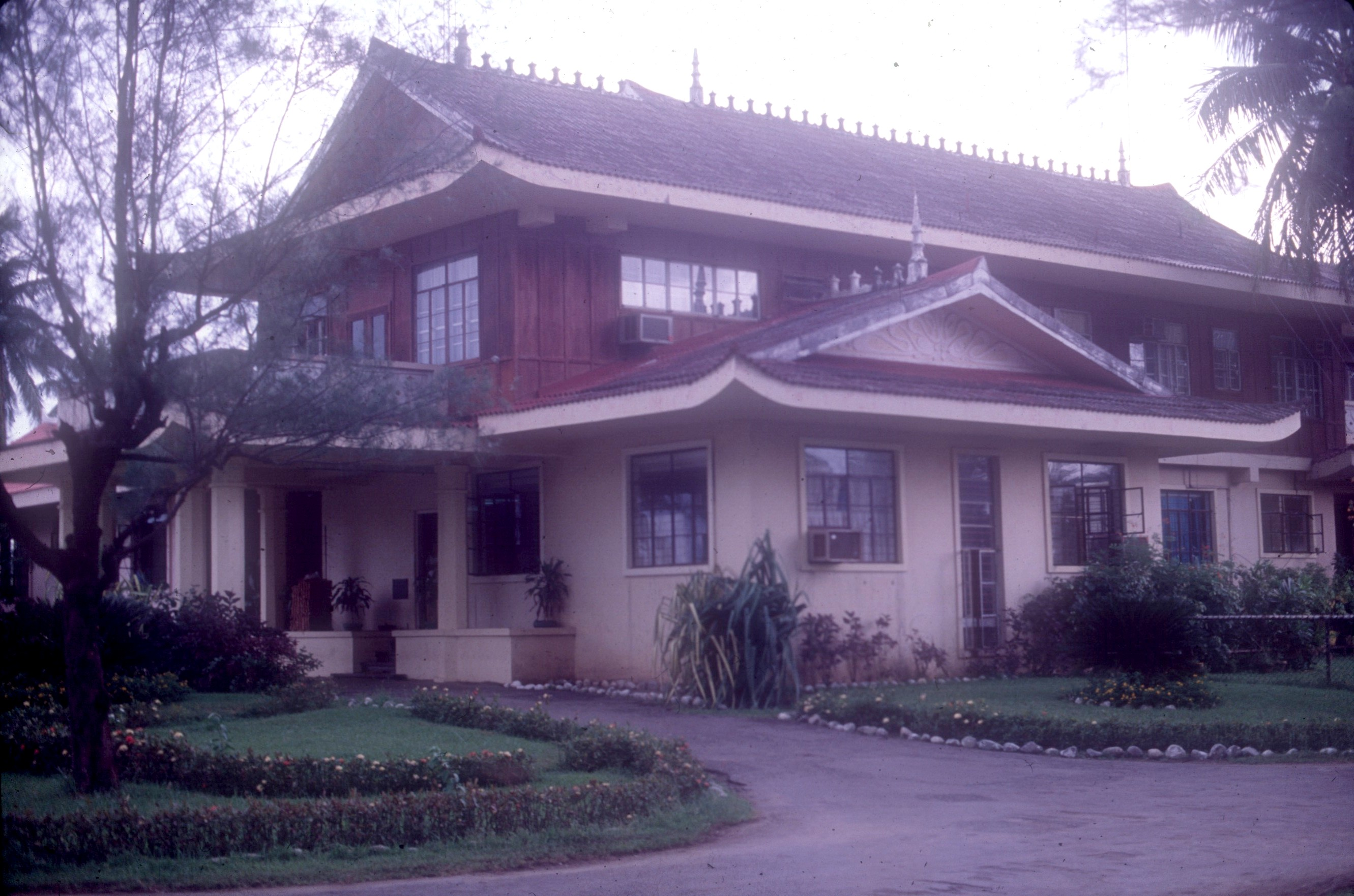
The Urduja House in Lingayen, Pangasinan in September 1982 as it was originally designed prior to the 2007 renovation

== Usage and facilities ==
Until the term of Governor Amado Espino Jr., the Urduja House also hosts the Governor's Office. But in a press statement on July 17, 2007, he initiated a reorganization program, which revamped the offices of the provincial government. Now the Governor also holds office in the Capitol, along with the Vice Governor and the Sangguniang Panlalawigan officials. The residence only serves as the living quarters of the governor, a ceremonial reception hall and a guesthouse for dignitaries staying overnight.

Inside the residence is a prized portrait of Princess Urduja, painted by Antonio Gonzalez Dumlao in 1954, and acquired by the provincial government on June 11, 2011. The painting is currently located fronting the entryway of the residence. It sits alongside a Fernando Amorsolo painting, also of the princess, commissioned by Governor Conrado Estrella, the first governor to actually hold residence in Urduja House.

Urduja House is part of the Pangasinan Provincial Capitol Complex that also includes the historic Sison Auditorium, the Finance Building, Lingayen Resort Hotel and the Veterans Memorial Park, just a few meters away from the actual landing site.

== Ownership dispute ==
A certain Amador and Aurora de Guzman claimed that the Urduja House sits on a property overlapping their 1,065 sq.m. lot. The dispute arose from the eviction ordered by the provincial government on illegal structures on the beachfront properties behind the capitol. A case was filed against the provincial government, but was dismissed by the Court of Appeals for lack of merit. A separate case against Engr. Alvin Bigay, former housing and homesite regulation officer of the Pangasinan Housing and Urban Development Coordinating Office, was also dismissed by the Ombudsman.
