= Lingayen =

Capital of Pangasinan, Philippines

- Municipality
- Municipality of Lingayen
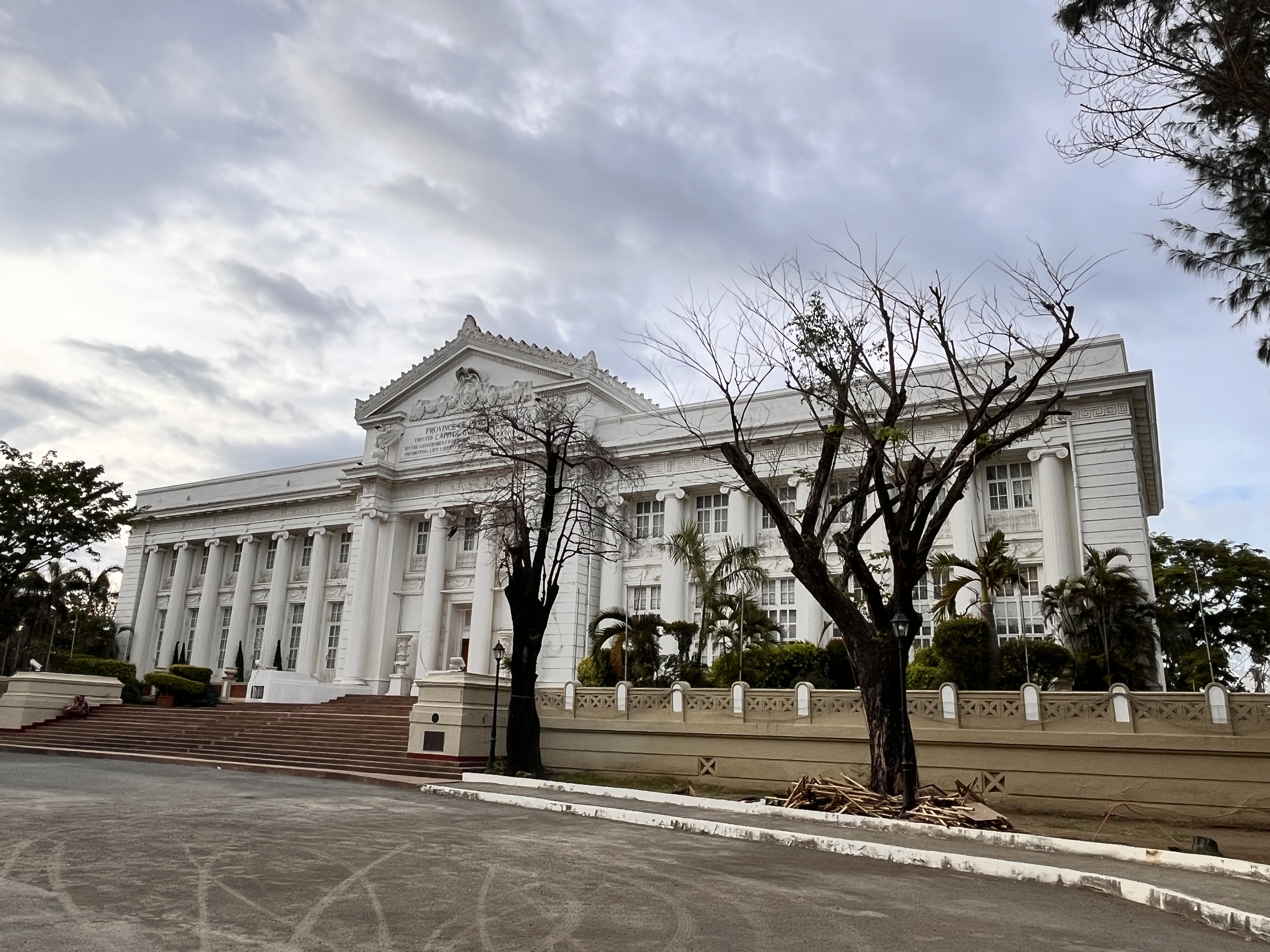
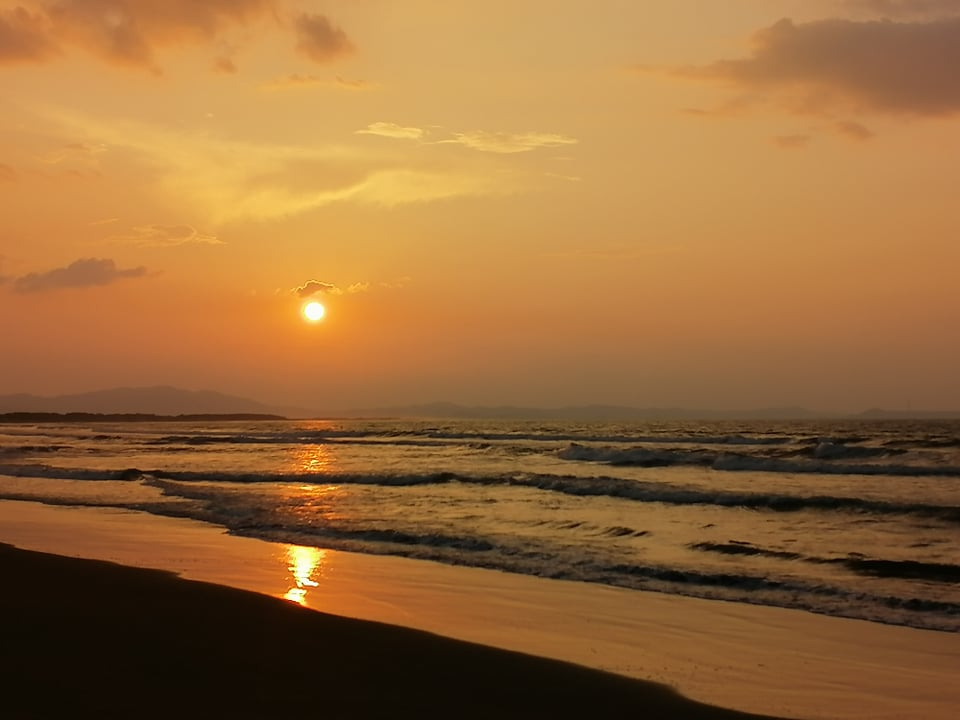
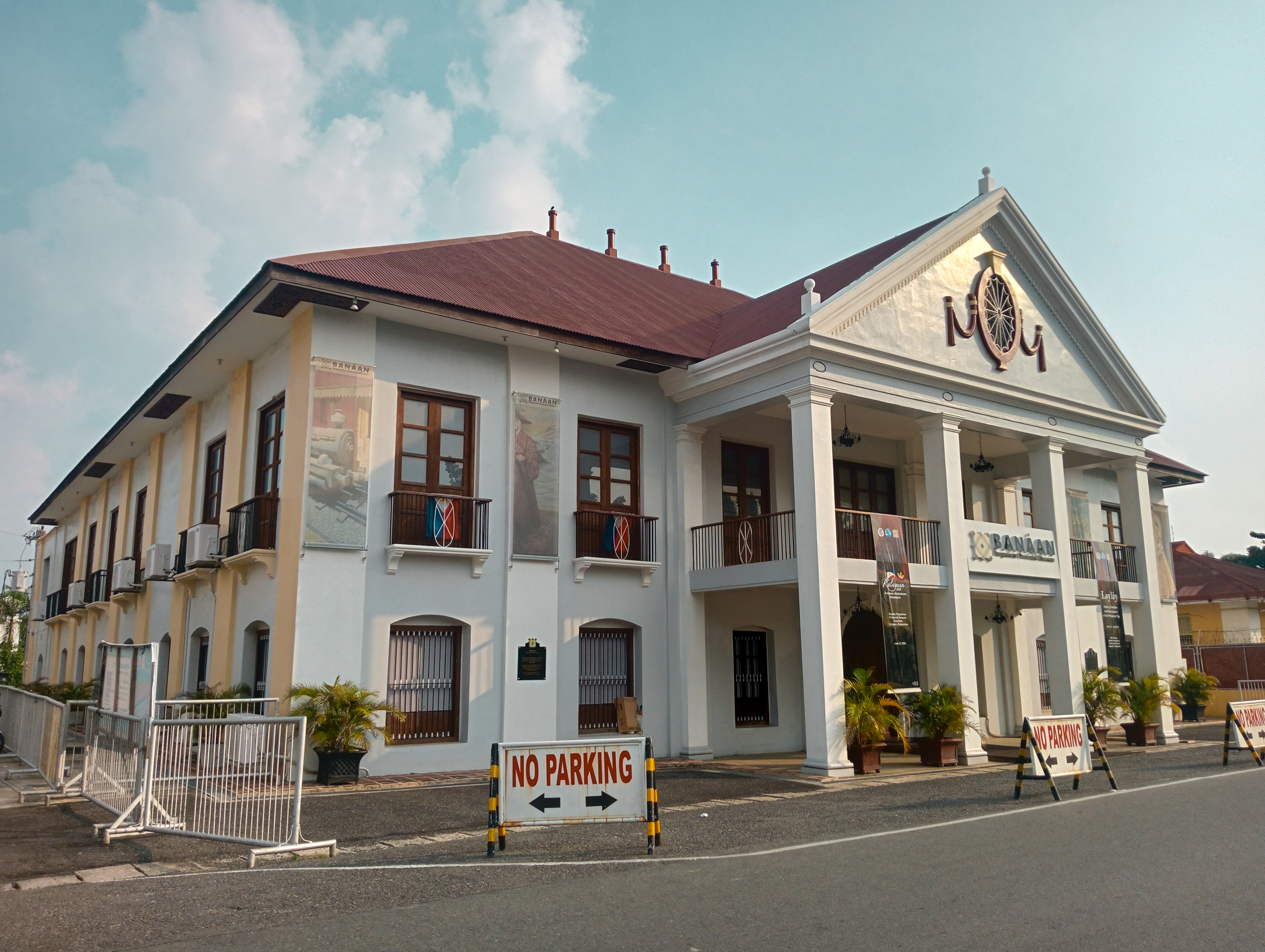
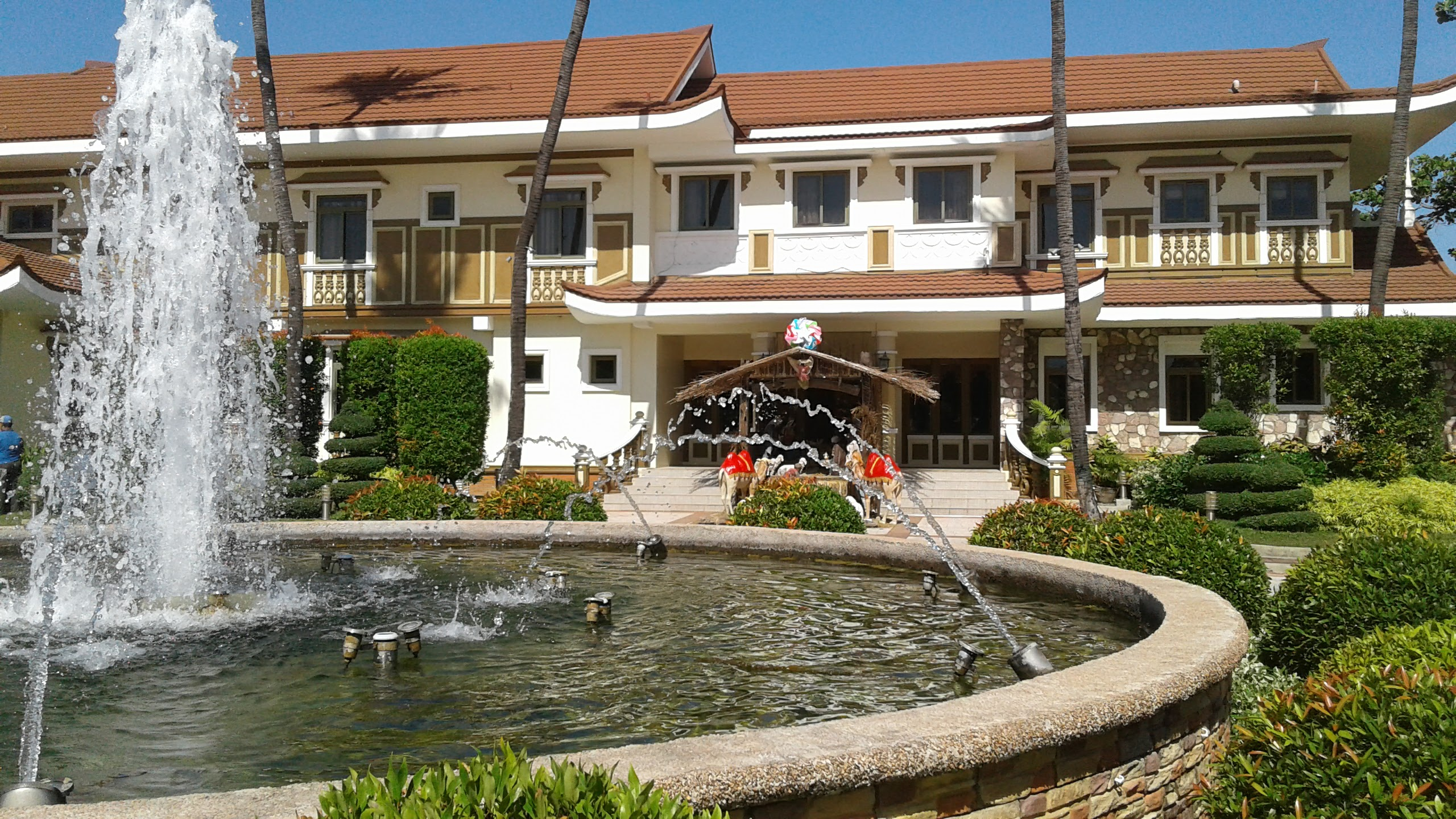
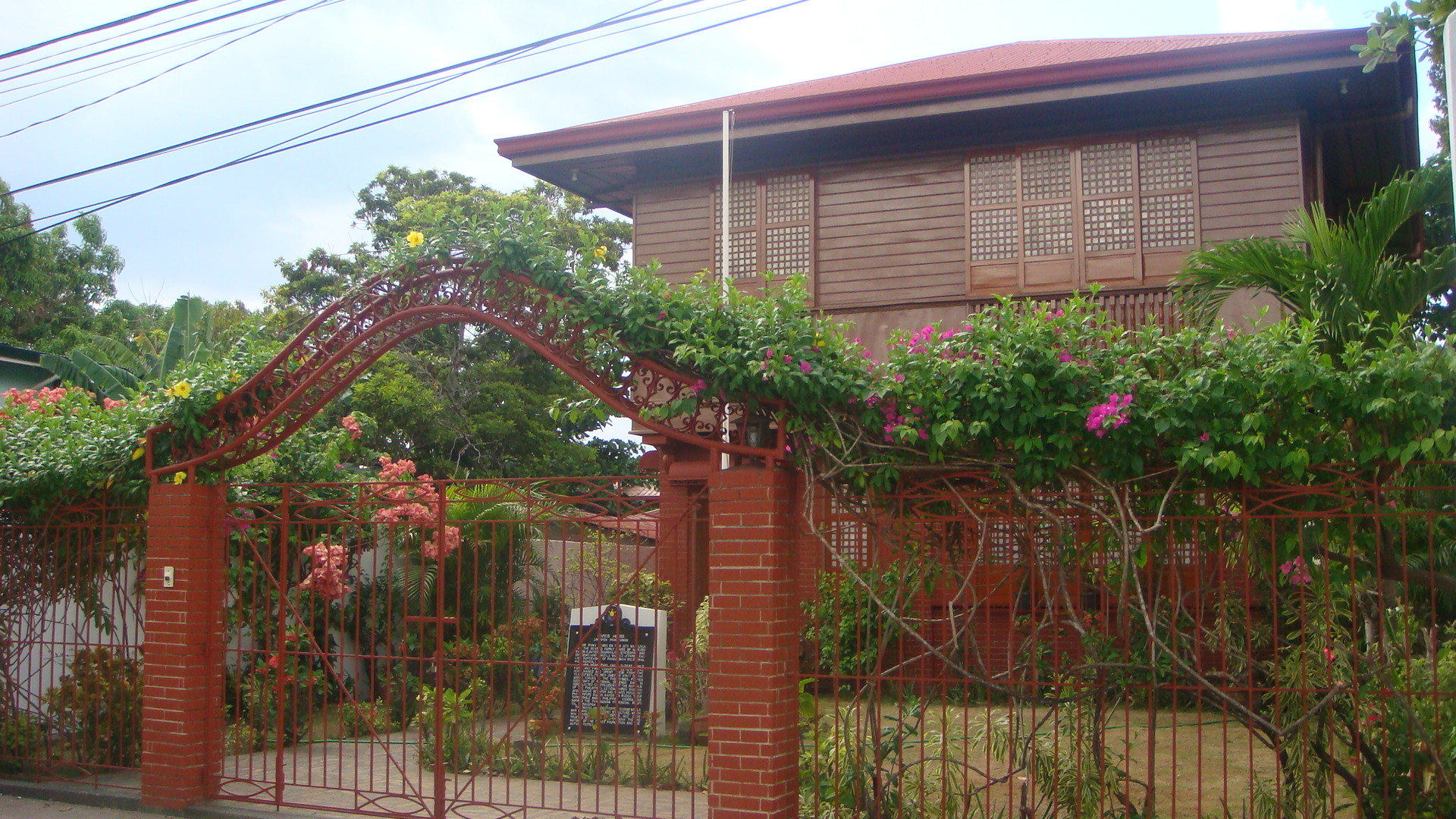
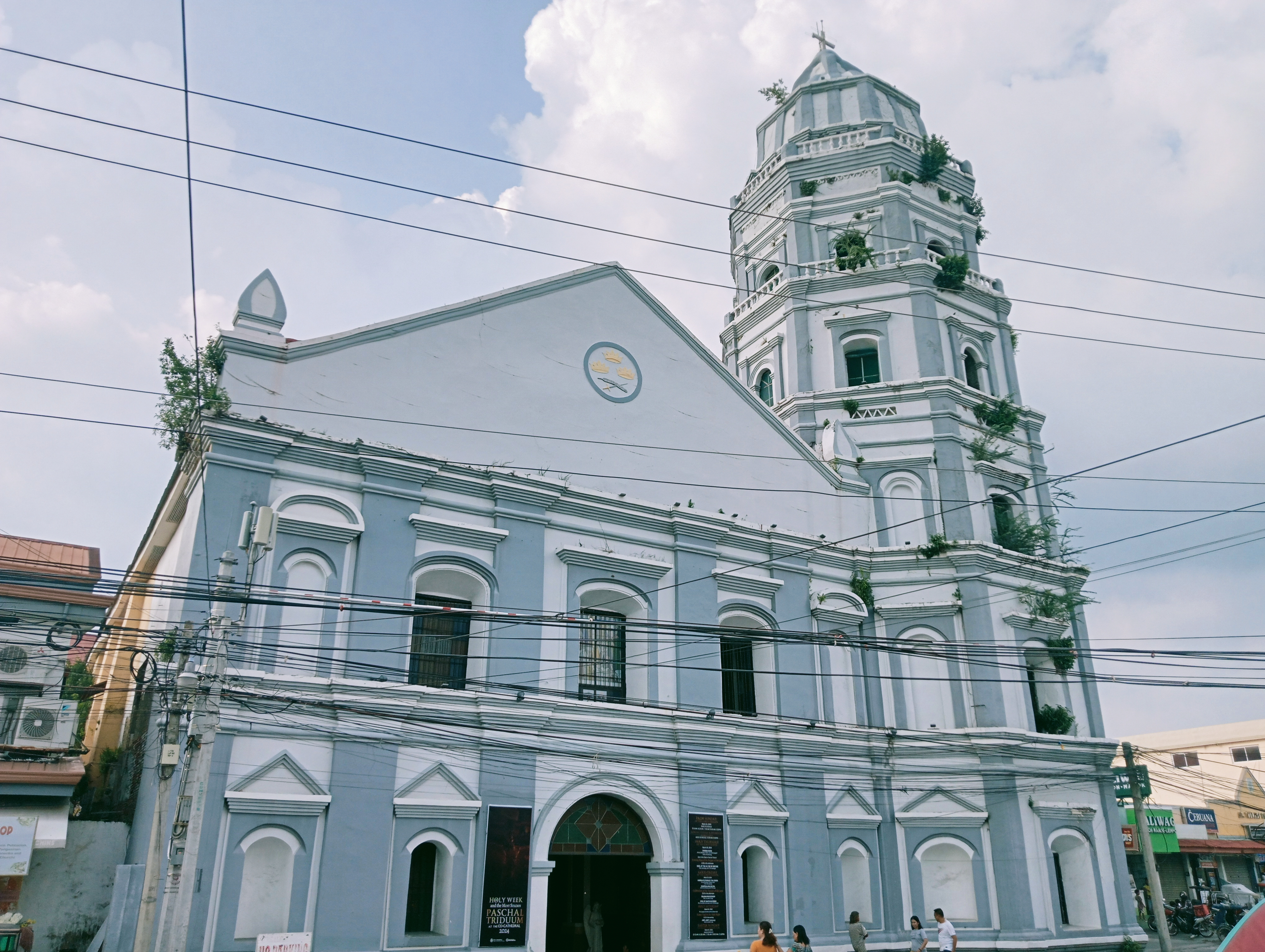
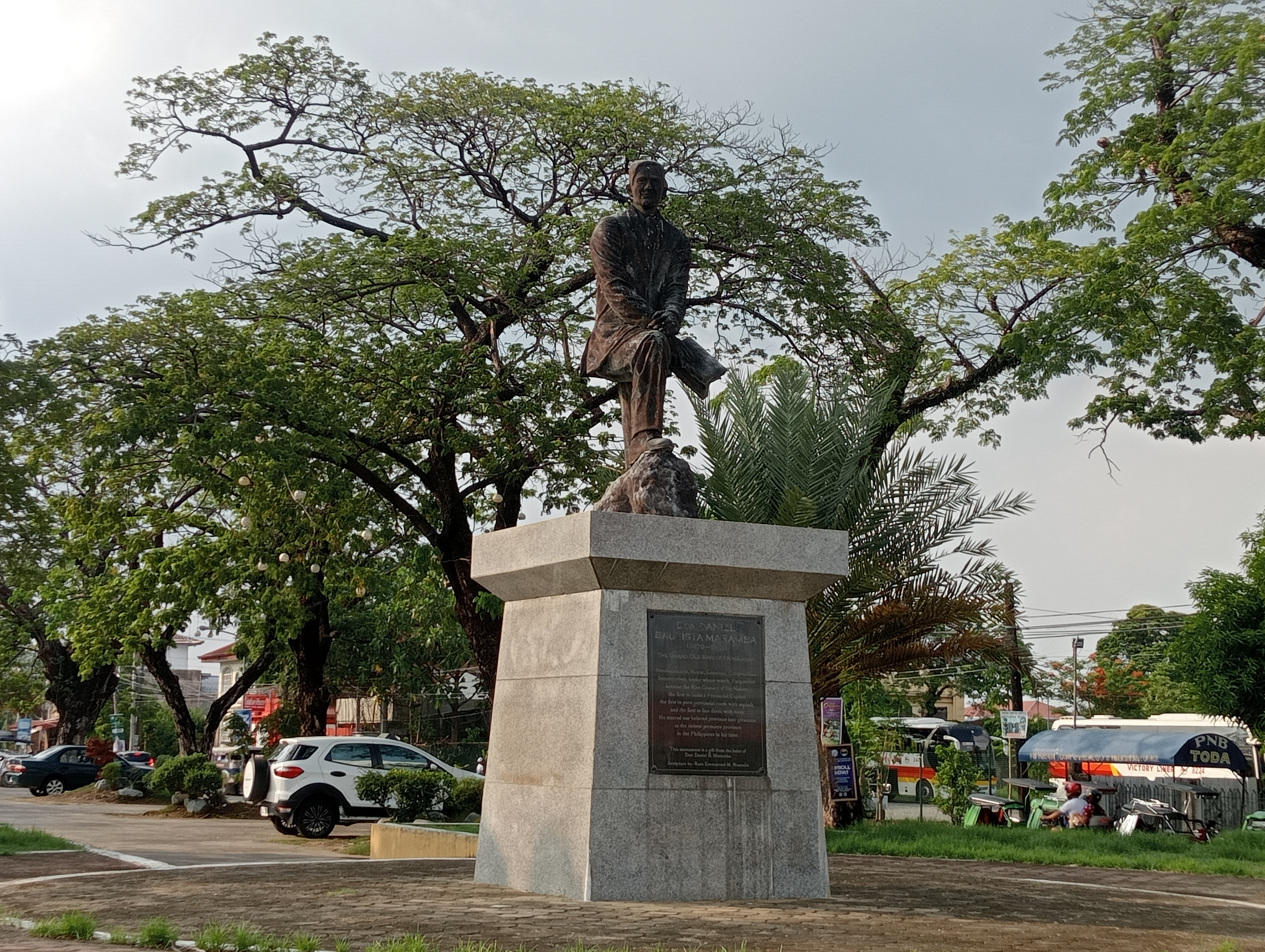
- Clockwise from top: Pangasinan Provincial Capitol; Banaan Museum (Casa Real); Ramos Ancestral House; Maramba Boulevard; Epiphany of Our Lord Co-Cathedral Parish; Urduja House; and sunset at Lingayen Gulf.

- Flag Seal

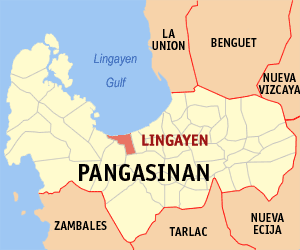
- Map of Pangasinan with Lingayen highlighted
- Interactive map of Lingayen
- Location within the Philippines
- Coordinates: 16°01′00″N 120°14′00″E
- Country: Philippines
- Region: Ilocos Region
- Province: Pangasinan
- District: 2nd district
- Founded: January 6, 1614
- Barangays: 32 (see Barangays)

Government
  - Type: Sangguniang Bayan
  - Mayor: Josefina "Iday" V. Castañeda
  - Vice Mayor: Jay Mark Kevin D. Crisostomo
  - Representative: Marcos "Mark" O. Cojuangco
  - Municipal Council: Members: John Marc M. Lopez; Norman Doroteo; Randall Bernal; Gabriel Macaraeg; Sylvester "Teng" Tapia; Von Carlo E. Tiangson; Angelie Agbuya; Jonathan T. Ramos; Darwin B. Jimenez (ABC Pres.); Gabriel Ivan C. Tuazon (SK Federation Pres.)
  - Electorate: 74,486 voters (2025)

Area
  - Total: 62.76 km^{2} (24.23 sq mi)
- Elevation: 7.0 m (23.0 ft)
- Highest elevation: 29 m (95 ft)
- Lowest elevation: 0 m (0 ft)

Population (2024 census)
  - Total: 108,510
  - Density: 1,729/km^{2} (4,478/sq mi)
  - Households: 25,001
- Demonym(s): Lingayenense (neutral); Lingayenean

Economy
  - Income class: 1st municipal income class
  - Poverty incidence: 11.94% (2023)
  - Revenue: ₱ 484.1 million (2024)
  - Assets: ₱ 1,104 million (2024)
  - Expenditure: ₱ 486 million (2024)
  - Liabilities: ₱ 42.86 million (2024)

Service provider
  - Electricity: Central Pangasinan Electric Cooperative (CENPELCO)
  - Water: LIWAD PrimeWater Lingayen
- Time zone: UTC+8 (PST)
- ZIP code: 2401
- PSGC: 0105522000
- IDD : area code: +63 (0)75
- Native languages: Pangasinan; Ilocano; Tagalog
- Website: lingayen.gov.ph

Lingayen, officially the Municipality of Lingayen ([ˌliŋgɐˈjɛn]; Pangasinan: Baley na Lingayen; Ilocano: Ili ti Lingayen; Tagalog: Bayan ng Lingayen), is a first-class municipality and the capital of the province of Pangasinan in the Philippines. It serves as the political, administrative, and historical center of the province, hosting key provincial government offices and institutions. According to the 2024 census, it has a population of 108,510 people., making it one of the most significant urban centers in the province in terms of governance and public administration.

The municipality occupies a strategic location along the Lingayen Gulf, which has historically contributed to its importance in trade, transportation, and military operations. Because of this geographic advantage, Lingayen played a crucial role during World War II, particularly as a major landing site for Allied forces during the liberation of Luzon in 1945. The town’s coastal position and infrastructure made it a vital strategic point, and its wartime history remains an important part of its local and national historical identity.

Lingayen is also notable as the birthplace of Fidel V. Ramos, the 12th President of the Philippines, who served from 1992 to 1998. His legacy has contributed to the town’s national prominence, and several landmarks and institutions in the municipality commemorate his life and public service. Through its historical significance, political role, and cultural heritage, Lingayen continues to play an important role in the development and governance of Pangasinan.

== History ==
=== Pre-colonial Period ===
Prior to Spanish colonization, the area now known as Lingayen formed part of the coastal settlements of Pangasinan, whose inhabitants, primarily Malayo-Polynesian people, were engaged in fishing, salt production, agriculture, and regional trade. Archaeological and historical studies indicate that Pangasinan maintained trade relations with Chinese, Japanese, and Southeast Asian merchants as early as the first millennium CE. The name Pangasinan itself derives from "asin" (salt), reflecting the economic importance of salt-making in the region.

=== Early Spanish conquest ===
Spanish expeditions led by maestre de campo Martín de Goiti and Juan de Salcedo extended Spanish authority into Pangasinan during the early phase of Spanish colonization in Luzon. By 1572, the province had been placed under the encomienda system, through which indigenous communities were required to render tribute and labor to Spanish encomenderos, reflecting the early administrative structure of the colonial rule.

=== Foundation of Lingayen ===
Augustinian missionaries and Spanish conquistadores drew a plan of and founded Lingayen in 1614. It became the capital of Pangasinan when the province became an encomienda. The word "Liñgayen" was from the Pangasinan language word "lingawen" meaning "to look back". The founders named the town Lingayen at the suggestion of the natives themselves, due to a certain corpulent tamarind tree growing on the present town plaza at that time. The tree was exceptionally big, tall, and spreading; that the surrounding trees were just drafts in comparison. Passers-by developed the habit of looking back and back again at this corpulent tree until it would vanish from their rear view. When they arrived home and were asked what way they took in returning they would simply say "through Liñgayen". Since then up to the present time the town bears its name as Lingayen.

Upon its establishment, Lingayen was designated as the capital of the Province of Pangasinan, serving as the political and administrative center under Spanish colonial rule. It functioned as an important hub for governance and missionary activity in the province.

=== Revolts and resistance ===
Lingayen was affected by regional resistance movements during the Spanish period. In 1660, Pangasinan leader Andres Malong led a revolt against Spanish rule, briefly seizing control of parts of the province, including areas near Lingayen, before Spanish forces suppressed the uprising in 1661.

=== American period (1898–1941) ===
Following Spain’s defeat in the Spanish–American War, Pangasinan came under American rule. In 1901, Lingayen was officially confirmed as the provincial capital under the newly established civil government.

The American period introduced reforms in public administration, infrastructure, and education. Public schools were established with the assistance of American teachers known as the Thomasites. Government buildings and roads were expanded, strengthening Lingayen’s role as the administrative center of the province.

The Provincial Capitol Building, constructed during the early 20th century, became the seat of the provincial government and remains one of the town’s most prominent landmarks.

=== World War II (1941–1945) ===
During World War II, Lingayen was invaded by the Japanese forces as one of the main targets due to being a gateway to the central plains of Central Luzon and eventually to the capital, Manila. During the occupation, Lingayen was a hotspot of US-sponsored guerrillas under Russell Volckmann, coordinating with Allied forces and providing intelligence in preparation for the return of American troops. On November 22, 1942, the guerrillas burned the bridge at Baay, Lingayen when the Japanese forces started conducting their mopping operations the same day.

==== Allied invasion and liberation ====
Lingayen assumed major strategic importance because of its location along Lingayen Gulf, whose wide beaches and favorable terrain made it suitable for large-scale amphibious landings.

The most significant wartime event associated with Lingayen occurred in January 1945, during the Invasion of Lingayen Gulf, a major phase of the Luzon Campaign. From 3 to 13 January 1945, Allied naval forces carried out extensive bombardments in preparation for amphibious landings by the United States Sixth Army. This operation has been carried out as the guerrillas have informed MacArthur that the Japanese had only a small presence in the area, giving the impression of being a safe place for the American incoming landing. Its long beach served as runway for several attack planes.

On 9 January 1945, Allied troops landed along a broad stretch of coastline in Lingayen Gulf, establishing a major beachhead for the liberation of Luzon. The landings involved hundreds of ships and tens of thousands of soldiers, making it one of the largest amphibious operations in the Pacific theater of World War II. Japanese resistance included aerial attacks, particularly kamikaze strikes, which caused damage and casualties among Allied naval forces. Despite these attacks, the landings succeeded, allowing Allied troops to advance southward toward Central Luzon and eventually Manila.

The Lingayen Gulf landings became a decisive turning point in the liberation of the Philippines and remain one of the most significant military events associated with the municipality and province.

=== Postwar period (1945–1960s) ===
Following the end of World War II, civil government in Pangasinan was gradually restored. Due to wartime destruction, the provincial government temporarily operated from Dagupan before returning to Lingayen later in 1945.

Postwar reconstruction focused on rebuilding damaged infrastructure, restoring public services, and reestablishing administrative institutions. Assistance from the Philippine government and postwar rehabilitation programs supported the reconstruction of roads, schools, and government buildings throughout the province.

The Pangasinan Provincial Capitol, which had sustained damage during the war, was reconstructed and restored between 1948 and 1949, reaffirming Lingayen’s role as the provincial capital. The restoration was completed during the administration of Governor Enrique Braganza and symbolized the province’s recovery from wartime devastation.

Educational institutions, municipal offices, and public services were likewise reopened or expanded during the postwar years, contributing to social stabilization and economic recovery across Lingayen and neighboring towns.

=== Contemporary era (1970s–present) ===
In the decades following reconstruction, Lingayen continued to serve as the provincial capital of Pangasinan, hosting the main offices of the provincial government and functioning as an administrative and political center of the province.

Lingayen continues to commemorate its role in World War II through memorials, historical markers, and annual observances marking the anniversary of the Lingayen Gulf landings. These events honor Filipino and Allied veterans and highlight the town’s role in the liberation of the Philippines.

In recent decades, the municipality has pursued development initiatives that emphasize heritage preservation, tourism, and public infrastructure improvement. Coastal areas, historical sites, and civic spaces have been promoted as cultural and educational destinations, while Lingayen continues to function as the administrative center of Pangasinan.

== Geography ==
The Municipality of Lingayen is located along Lingayen Gulf, the Agno River and the Limahong Channel. It has a land area of 62.76 square kilometers consisting of 32 barangays and also has 7 sitios. Its terrain is flat, suitable for farms and fisheries. Lingayen weather is cool from December to February, warm from March to April, and the wet season is between May and October.

Lingayen is 217.82 kilometres (135.35 mi) from the country's capital city of Manila via Romulo Highway.

=== Barangays ===
Lingayen is politically subdivided into 32 barangays. Each barangay consists of puroks and some have sitios.

- Aliwekwek
- Baay
- Balangobong
- Balococ
- Bantayan
- Basing
- Capandanan
- Domalandan Center
- Domalandan East
- Domalandan West
- Dorongan
- Dulag
- Estanza
- Lasip
- Libsong East
- Libsong West
- Malawa
- Malimpuec
- Maniboc
- Matalava
- Naguelguel
- Namolan
- Pangapisan North
- Pangapisan Sur
- Poblacion
- Quibaol
- Rosario
- Sabangan
- Talogtog
- Tonton
- Tumbar
- Wawa

=== Climate ===
Lingayen has a tropical savanna climate.

Climate data for Lingayen, Pangasinan
Month	Jan	Feb	Mar	Apr	May	Jun	Jul	Aug	Sep	Oct	Nov	Dec	Year
Mean daily maximum °C (°F)	31 (88)	31 (88)	33 (91)	34 (93)	34 (93)	33 (91)	32 (90)	31 (88)	31 (88)	32 (90)	31 (88)	31 (88)	32 (90)
Mean daily minimum °C (°F)	21 (70)	21 (70)	23 (73)	25 (77)	25 (77)	25 (77)	25 (77)	24 (75)	24 (75)	24 (75)	23 (73)	22 (72)	24 (74)
Average rainfall mm (inches)	4.3 (0.17)	19.1 (0.75)	27.3 (1.07)	45.2 (1.78)	153.3 (6.04)	271.3 (10.68)	411.1 (16.19)	532.0 (20.94)	364.4 (14.35)	182.5 (7.19)	56.3 (2.22)	24.4 (0.96)	2,091.2 (82.34)
Average rainy days	3	2	3	5	14	17	22	23	21	13	7	4	134
Source: World Weather Online

== Demographics ==
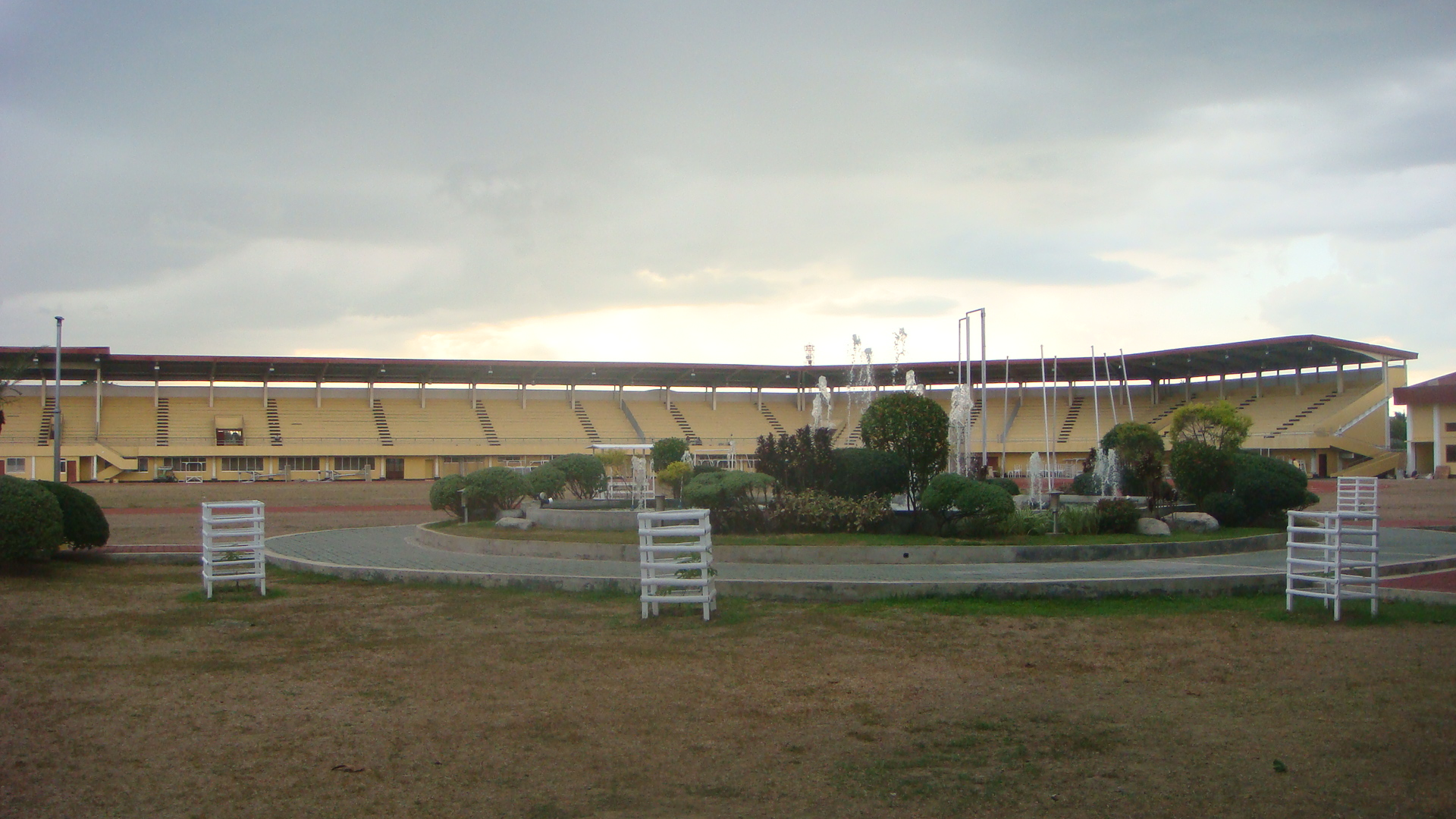
Narciso Ramos Sports Complex & Civic Center

Population census of Lingayen

Year	Pop.	±% p.a.
1903	21,529	—
1918	22,750	+0.37%
1939	30,655	+1.43%
1948	36,806	+2.05%
1960	45,321	+1.75%
1970	56,096	+2.15%

Year	Pop.	±% p.a.
1975	59,034	+1.03%
1980	65,187	+2.00%
1990	77,837	+1.79%
1995	80,758	+0.69%
2000	88,891	+2.08%
2007	95,773	+1.03%

Year	Pop.	±% p.a.
2010	98,740	+1.12%
2015	103,278	+0.86%
2020	107,728	+0.89%
2024	108,510	+0.17%

Source: Philippine Statistics Authority

=== Languages ===
Pangasinan and Ilocano are the dominant dialects spoken in the municipality of Lingayen, reflecting its cultural history and patterns of settlement. The Pangasinan language has long served as the lingua franca of the town, commonly used in daily communication, local governance, and community interactions among the native residents. On the other hand, Ilocano is primarily spoken by migrants who came from the northern provinces, particularly those who settled in Lingayen in search of better economic opportunities. Over time, the presence of these two languages has contributed to the town’s linguistic diversity, shaping communication, social relations, and cultural identity within the community.

== Economy ==
Poverty incidence of Lingayen (%)

Source: Philippine Statistics Authority

Agriculture, livestock and fishing are the major industries of the town.

Major crops include rice, corn, tomato, mongo, watermelon, and vegetables.

Livestock rising are predominant in the southern barangays where vast, long stretch of pasture lands can be found.

The major fishing ground is Lingayen Gulf within the municipal territorial waters of fifteen (15) kilometers from the shoreline classified as the municipal fishing ground. Fisheries can be found in every barangay.

Other major industries include making of world-class bagoong (also known as "maniboc": referring to its place of origin, Barangay Maniboc) and bocayo (sweetened coconut), vinegar, furnitures, crafts made of bamboo, and shingles made of nipa. Its bagoong shrimp paste is so well known, that in 2016 the Canadian Federal Court of Appeal was called to rule on whether the name "Lingayen" could be registered as a trademark to sell the paste (which it denied).

=== Agriculture ===
The town has a land area of 3,180 hectares or 47.5% of the total land area of the municipality used for agriculture by a land survey conducted by Municipal Planning Team. Rice, being the major crop produced, have 1,500 hectares/ 22.42% of the total land area of the municipality. Corn come next with 341.50 hectares/ 5.11%, with peanut comes third with 136.6 hectares/2.04% while the rest of about 253.225 hectares or 3.78% is planted to different crops such as mongo, camote, eggplant, and other crops.

=== Livestock ===
Information gathered from the Office of the Municipal Agricultural Officer, shows that in year 2000 there were 5,282 head of swine, 2,762 head of cattle, 756 head of carabao, 1,520 head of sheep and goat combined, 44,000 head of poultry (commercial broilers), and 43,875 heads of poultry (native chickens).

=== Fishery ===
There are two types of fishery operation in the town depending on the type of water which supplies the fishery: brackish water and freshwater.

Brackish fisheries have a bigger land area than freshwater with a land area of 1,419.18 hectares. These fisheries can be found in 28 barangays with Baay being the largest with 157 hectares.

Freshwater fisheries have a land area of about 38.82 hectares and are located in ten barangays. Namolan have the largest with 7.80 hectares.

== Socio-Cultural development ==
Plaza de Lingayen resonating resemblance to a Spanish city square

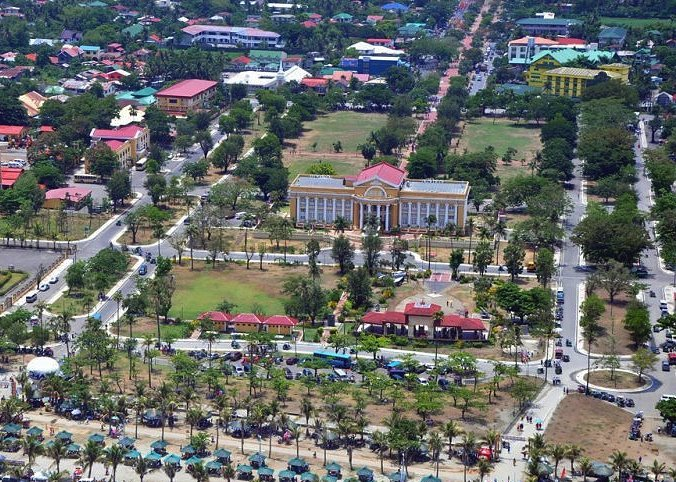
An American-styled design of Pangasinan Provincial Capitol Park

Lingayen poblacion is divided into two distinct portions that differ both architecturally and culturally, reflecting the strong and lasting influence of two major colonizers: Spain and the United States. These two sections of the town clearly demonstrate how colonial rule shaped the physical layout, governance, and cultural identity of Lingayen across different historical periods.

The older portion, which bears strong Spanish influence, is located in the southern part of the poblacion. Following the traditional Spanish plaza complex design, the town’s infrastructure was carefully planned so that the most important buildings were arranged facing one another around a central town plaza. This layout manifest the close centralization between church and state during the Spanish colonial era. Prominent structures in this area include the Lingayen Co-Cathedral which served as the religious center of the community, and the Municipal hall, which functioned as the seat of local governance. Together, these buildings highlight the Spanish emphasis on centralized authority, religion, and community life.

In contrast, the American-influenced portion of Lingayen poblacion was developed near the Lingayen Gulf and reflects a different architectural style and urban planning philosophy. This area consists mainly of provincial government buildings constructed during the American period, emphasizing order, openness, and administrative efficiency. Notable structures include the Provincial Capitol and the Urduja House, both situated within the Capitol Grounds. The wide open spaces, landscaped surroundings, and neoclassical-inspired designs reflect American ideals of governance and civic pride.

Overall, the coexistence of these Spanish- and American-influenced sections within Lingayen poblacion illustrates the town’s layered colonial history. Each area represents a distinct period that contributed to the development of Lingayen’s identity, making the poblacion not only a political center but also a living showcase of the cultural and architectural legacy left by its former colonizers.

== Tourism ==
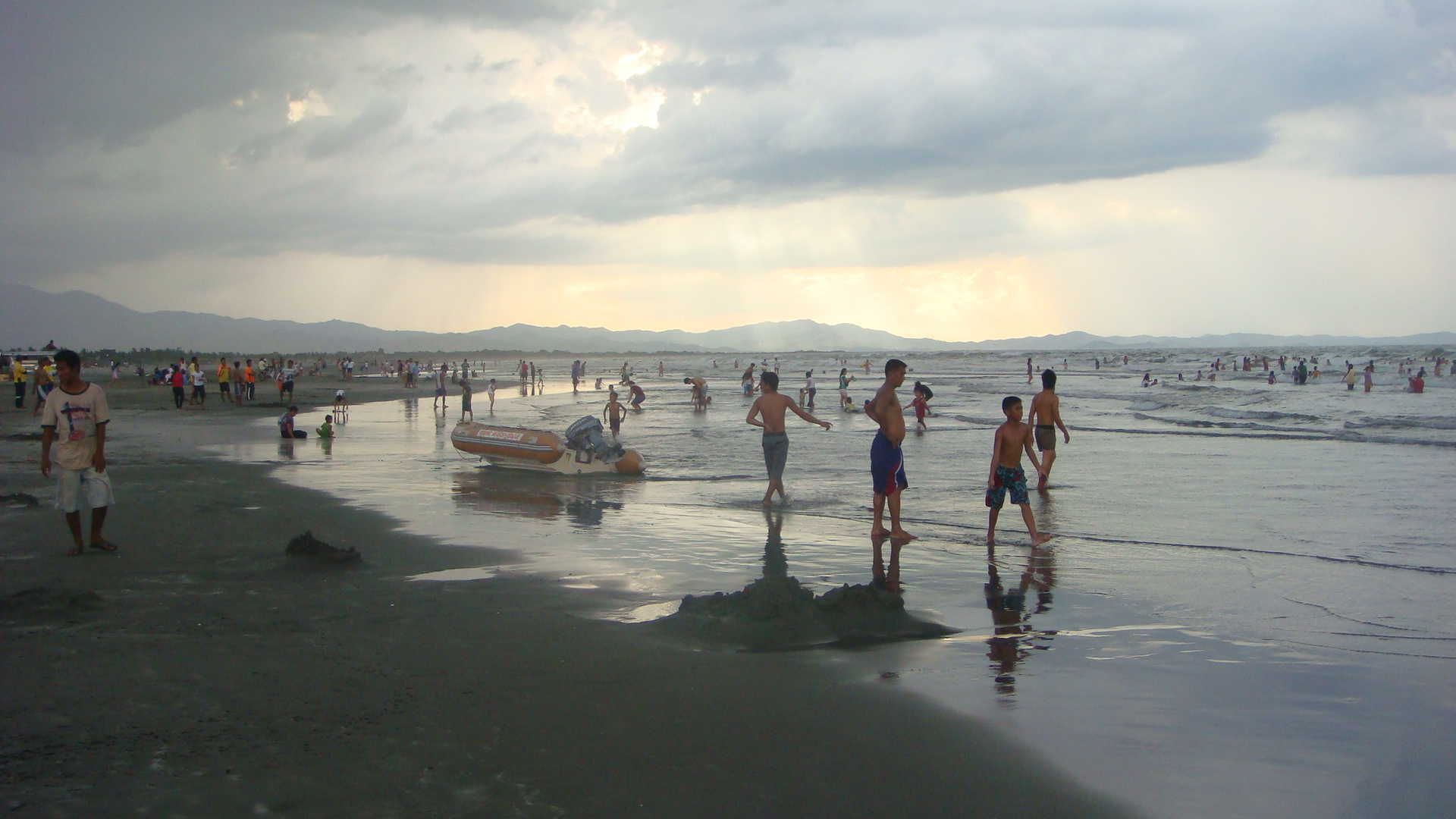
Lingayen Beach

The municipality has many attractions: Lingayen Beach, the Provincial Capitol, Urduja House, the World War II Memorabilia Ground Site, Sison Auditorium, the Narciso Ramos Sports Complex and Civic Center and the Limahong Channel Tourism Center located at Lingayen BayWalk beside Agno River, the center will have its own river cruise, tourism building center and river esplanade that is under construction and is set to commence its opening of Phase 1 in January 2021, while the Phase 2 and 3 of the tourism center awaits funding.

It also has two parks: the Town Park also known as Plaza de Lingayen and the Capitol Grounds. The town celebrates its Town Fiesta in honor of the Three Kings every first Friday, Saturday & Sunday of January; also celebrates "Bagoong Festival" to promote the main product of the town, happens a week after the town fiesta celebration; and joins to celebrate Pista'y Dayat (Beach Festival) which is being celebrated in the entire province of Pangasinan.

=== Heritage Structures ===
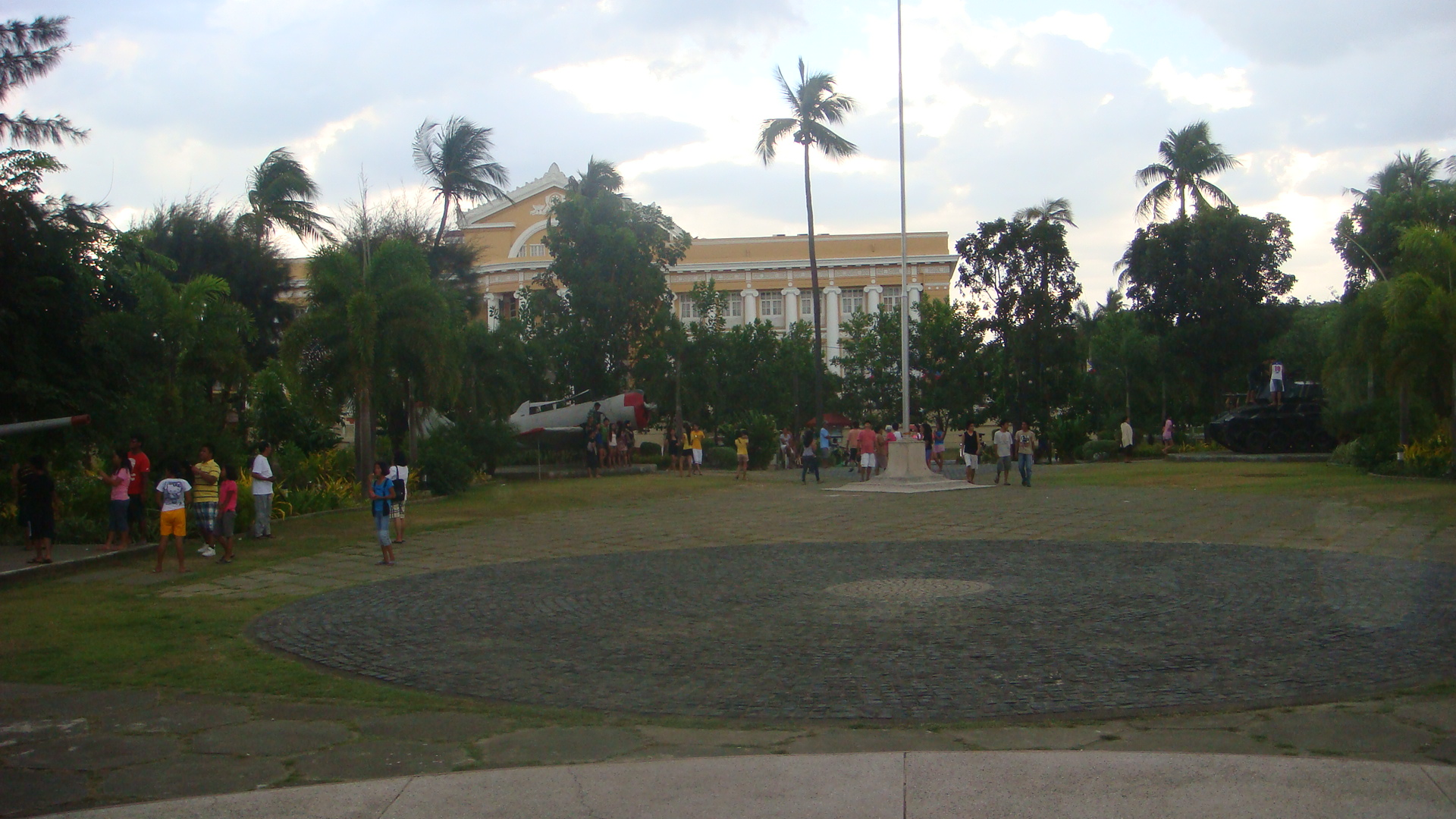
Town Park & Capitol Grounds

Heritage structures abound in the city of Lingayen:

Pangasinan Provincial Capitol Building is a neoclassical building designed by Ralph Harrington Doane. It was damaged during World War II and was reconstructed in 1946 with assistance from the US government under the Philippine Rehabilitation Act. With the completion of its repair and rehabilitation in 2008, the building earned the title "Best Provincial Capitol in the Philippines".

Urduja House, also called the Princess Urduja Palace, is named after the legendary warrior Princess Urduja. It currently serves as the governor's official residence and guest house.

Colegio del Santissimo Rosario Ruins was constructed in 1890 as an exclusive school for girls run by the Dominican sisters. Its lumber, windows, tin roofs, and beams were used to build another school in San Manuel town, leaving the structure in ruins. At present, it is within the compound of a private property.

Pangasinan National High School, erstwhile known as Pangasinan Academic High School, was the first public secondary school in Pangasinan. In 1946, the North and South Gabaldon buildings were constructed within the school campus. And now it is considered as the mother school in entire Pangasinan. Thousands of students are enrolled in this school. And due to the K-12 Program it also offer courses for Senior High School students. The school has several buildings for the Senior High School.

Malong Building is named after a Pangasinense hero named Andres Malong who led the revolt against the Spaniards from 1660 to 1661. Construction of the building started in 1956 and completed in 1958. It got a major renovation in 2008, the same year the Pangasinan Provincial Capitol Building had undergone a facelift.

Palaris Building, formerly known as Kalantiaw Building, was named after Datu Kalantiaw, said to have composed the first legal code of the Philippines, the Code of Kalantiaw. The code was said to be fraudulent and Kalantiyaw was not a Pangasinense but an Aklanon, according to some historical accounts. The building was renamed Palaris, in honor of the heroic acts of Pantaleon Perez, also known as "Palaris" in leading the Pangasinense rebels from 1762 to 1764 against the Spaniards.

Sison Auditorium was built in Neo-classical Style, and was constructed in 1927. It was initially known as the “Grand Provincial Auditorium” in the 1930s was the popular venue for zarzuelas and other cultural performances in pre-war and early post-war period. It was later renamed after former Governor Teofilo Sison, the first Pangasinense to become secretary of National Defense. In 2010, it had undergone a major renovation and inaugurated in the same year, April 5. At present, Sison Auditorium serves as the Cultural Center of Ilocos Region.

== Transportation ==
Several bus companies like Victory Liner and Pangasinan Solid North have routes going to Lingayen from Manila, Baguio, and Dagupan every day. The town has a small airport, Lingayen Airport, where light planes can land and served as a community airport in Lingayen and surrounding areas.

== Government ==
=== Local government ===
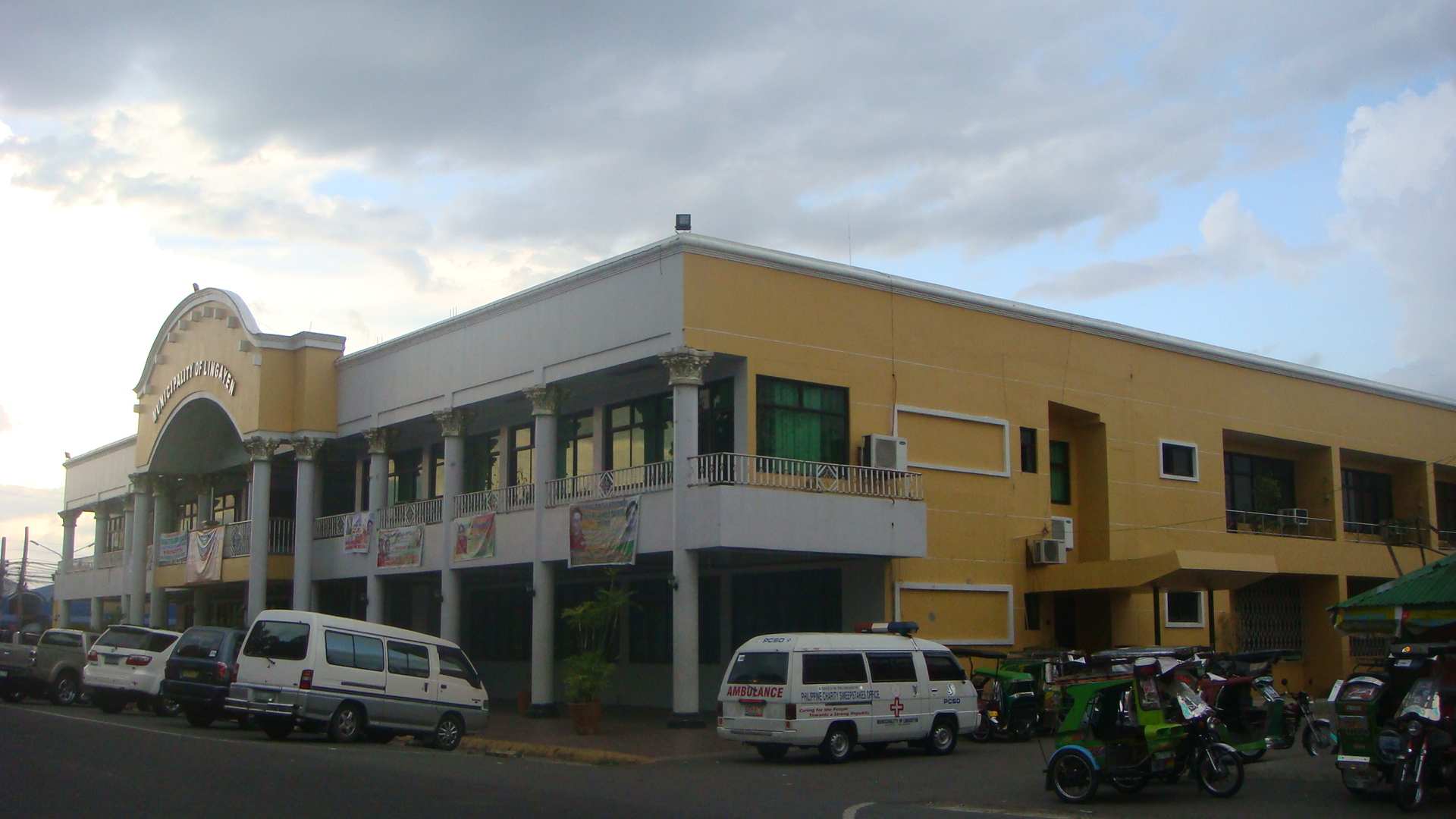
Town Hall

Lingayen, belonging to the second congressional district of the province of Pangasinan, is governed by a mayor designated as its local chief executive and by a municipal council as its legislative body in accordance with the Local Government Code. The mayor, vice mayor, and the councilors are elected directly by the people through an election which is being held every three years.

=== Elected officials ===
Members of the Municipal Council (2025–2028)
Position	Name
Congressman	Marcos Juan Bruno "Mark" Oppen Cojuangco
Mayor	Josefina "Iday" Vila Castañeda
Vice-Mayor	Jay Mark Kevin Dela Cruz Crisostomo
Councilors	John Marc "Jolo" Meneses Lopez
Councilors	Norman Cruz Doroteo
Councilors	Randall Quijano Bernal
Councilors	Atty. Gabriel "Gab" Escaño Macaraeg
Councilors	John Silvester "Teng" Arenas Tapia
Councilors	Doc Von-Carlo Enrique Tiangson
Councilors	Angelie Agbuya Ediong
Councilors	Ramon Anselmo "Rasel" Montes Cuaresma

== Education ==
There are three schools district offices which govern all educational institutions within the municipality. They oversee the management and operations of all private and public elementary and high schools. These are the Lingayen I Schools District Office, Lingayen II Schools District Office, and Lingayen III Schools District Office.

=== Primary and elementary schools ===
Lingayen I:

- Dulag Elementary Schools
- Libsong Elementary Schools
- Lingayen I Central School
- Magsaysay Elementary Schools
- Matalava Elementary Schools
- Naguelguel Elementary Schools
- Namolan Elementary Schools
- Quibaol Elementary Schools
- Tonton Elementary Schools
- Tumbar Elementary Schools

Lingayen II:

- Baay Elementary Schools
- Balangobong Elementary Schools
- Capandanan Elementary Schools
- Domalandan Center Elementary Schools
- Domalandan East Elementary Schools
- Estanza Elementary Schools
- Guesang Elementary Schools
- Malimpuec Elementary Schools
- Padilla Central School
- Sabangan Elementary Schools
- Samson-Bengson Elementary Schools

Lingayen III:

- Aliwekwek Elementary Schools
- Aplaya Elementary Schools
- Balococ Elementary Schools
- Bantayan Elementary Schools
- Basing Elementary Schools
- Lasip Elementary Schools
- Malawa Elementary Schools
- Pangapisan Elementary Schools
- Poblacion Central School
- Rosario Elementary Schools
- Wawa Elementary Schools

==== Private schools ====
- Carvlex Academy
- Grace Baptist Learning Center of GFBC
- Happy Times Christian School
- Harvent School
- Heritage Christian School
- JCSGO Christian Academy
- JN Montesorri High School
- Jesus Good Shepherd Development Center
- Lingayen Educational Center
- Saint Columban College
- Saint Columban's Institute
- College of Saint Marshall

=== Secondary schools ===
- Domalandan Integrated School
- Estanza National High School
- Lasip National High School
- Malawa Integrated School
- Pangasinan National High School
- Pangasinan School of Arts and Trades

=== Technical and vocational schools ===
- Lingayen Technological Institute
- TESDA-Pangasinan School of Arts and Trades

=== Higher educational institutions ===
- Pangasinan Memorial College
- Pangasinan State University: Lingayen Campus and Open University systems
- St. Columban's College
- The Adelphi College
- The College of the Marshall Curtis
