= Urduja =

Asian folk hero, warrior princess

Urduja was a legendary warrior princess recorded in the travel accounts of Ibn Battuta (1304 – possibly 1368 or 1377). She was described to be a princess of Kaylukari in the land of Tawalisi. Though the locations of Kaylukari and Tawalisi are disputed, in the Philippines, Urduja is believed by modern Filipinos to be from Pangasinan, and has since been regarded as a national heroine.

== Ibn Battuta ==
Ibn Battuta described Urduja as the ruler of Kaylukari in the land of Tawalisi and leader of the Kinalakian. After reaching the Samudera Pasai Sultanate in what is now Sumatra, Indonesia, Ibn Battuta passed by Tawalisi on his way to China. Princess Urduja was described as a daughter of a ruler named Tawalisi of a land that was also called Tawalisi. The ruler of Tawalisi, according to Ibn Battuta, possessed many junk ships and was a rival of China, which was then ruled by a Mongol dynasty. Ibn Battuta sailed for 17 days to reach China from the land of Tawalisi.

Ibn Battuta made a pilgrimage to Mecca and he traveled to many other parts of the Islamic world. From India and Sumatra, Ibn Battuta reached the land of Tawalisi. Ibn Battuta described Urduja as a warrior princess whose army was composed of men and women. Urduja was a woman warrior who personally took part in the fighting and engaged in duels with other warriors. She was quoted as saying that she will marry no one but him who defeats her in duel. Other warriors avoided fighting her for fear of being disgraced.

Urduja impressed Ibn Battuta with her military exploits and her ambition to lead an expedition to India, known to her as the "Pepper Country". She also showed her hospitality by preparing a banquet for Ibn Battuta and the crew of his ship. Urduja generously provided Ibn Battuta with gifts that included robes, rice, two buffaloes, and four large jars of ginger, pepper, lemons, and mangoes, all salted, in preparation for Ibn Battuta's sea-voyage to China.

== Research ==
A long list of guesses to the location of Tawalisi have included Pangasinan, Luzon, Sulu, Celebes (Sulawesi), Java, Cambodia, Cochinchina, the mainland Chinese province of Guangdong, and practically every island in South Asia beginning with ta.

=== Philippine theory ===
In the late 19th century, José Rizal, national hero of the Philippines, speculated that the land of Tawalisi was in the area of the northern part of the Philippines, based on his calculation of the time and distance of travel Ibn Battuta took to sail to China from Tawalisi. In 1916, Austin Craig, an American historian of the University of the Philippines, in "The Particulars of the Philippines Pre-Spanish Past", traced the land of Tawalisi and Princess Urduja to Pangasinan. In the province of Pangasinan, the governor's residence in Lingayen is named "Urduja House". A statue of Princess Urduja stands at the Hundred Islands National Park in Pangasinan. Philippine school textbooks used to include Princess Urduja in the list of great Filipinos.

Princess Urduja's gifts of rice, buffaloes, ginger, pepper, lemons, mangoes, and salt are products that are abundant in Pangasinan and India. The closely related Ibaloi people have an oral tradition of a woman named Udayan who ruled an ancient alliance of lowland and highland settlements in Pangasinan and the neighboring province of Benguet. Ibn Battuta also mentioned that Urduja had some knowledge of a Turkic language, which indicates contact with foreigners. Tawalisi was said to be in contact with Mongol-ruled Yuan China so the Turkic language may have been Mongolian.

Ibn Batutta's travel account suggests that he also saw elephants in the land ruled by Urduja. Elephants can still be found in Borneo, and may have been gifts or traded in Pangasinan in earlier times. Ancient Malayo-Polynesian sailing vessels (such as the Balangay), like the ones used by the ancient Bugis and those depicted in the Borobudur bas-reliefs, were capable of transporting heavy cargo, including elephants. There are depictions of such ancient ships in maritime Southeast Asia transporting several elephants for trade.

=== Java theory ===
The aforementioned gifts can also be found in Java. Chinese records showed that, almost all of Asian commodities can be found in Java during the Majapahit era. This is because the Javanese merchants were travelling as far as Ghana since the 8th century. Java had been attacked by Mongols they called Tatars in 1293. According to friar Odoric of Pordenone, the great khan of Cathay (Yuan dynasty) attacked Java (Majapahit) many times but was always defeated. Hence, it is probable that Java at that time especially the royal court had also been linguistically influenced by the Turkic speaking Tatars. So it is possible that the Bhre Daha (the ruler of Daha) could talk in Turkic as was observed by Ibn Battuta during his visit to her court.

During Ibn Battuta's travels, in Java there was a Bhre Kahuripan (Duchess of Kahuripan) named Tribhuwana Wijayatunggadewi and she became queen of Majapahit from 1328 to 1350 AD. Majapahit also possessed a powerful navy of Javanese junks (jong) during its era. Each junk is able to carry 600–1000 men, was more than 69 to 80 metres (226 to 262 ft) long, and could carry several hundred horses. The number of junks possessed by Majapahit is unknown, but the largest expedition mobilized 400 large junks. This matches the account of Odoric about the junk he boarded while traveling in Southeast Asia—which carried 700 men, and Ibn Battuta's description about Tawalisi having numerous junks that were used to fight the king of China.

== In popular culture ==
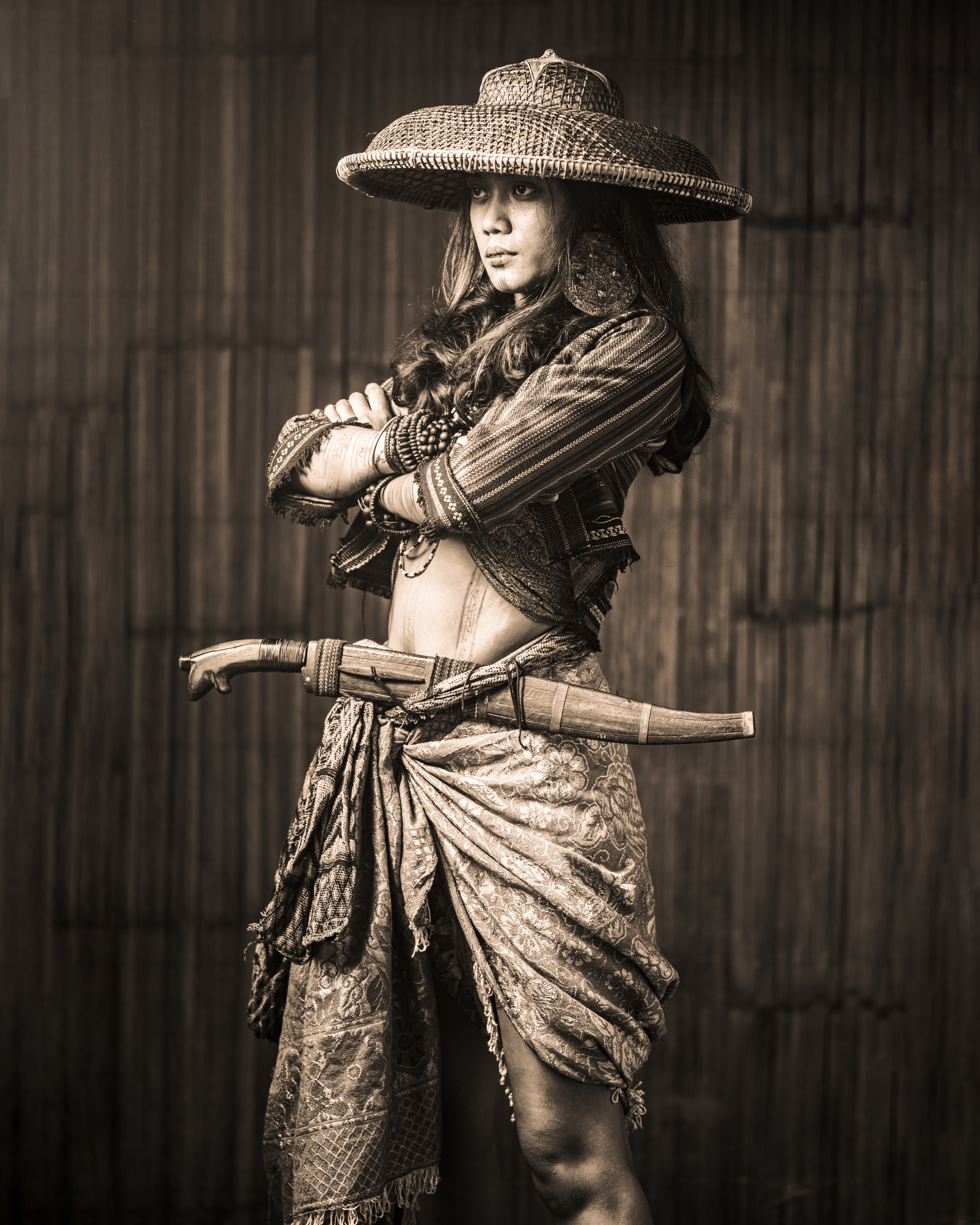
Contemporary depiction of Urduja

Princesa Urduja, a live-action adventure film based on the legend, was released in 1942.

Urduja, an animated feature based on the legendary princess, was released on June 18, 2008. It stars Regine Velasquez (in the lead role of Princess Urduja), Cesar Montano (as Lim Hang), Eddie Garcia (as Lakanpati), Johnny Delgado (as Wang), Epi Quizon (as Daisuke), Ruby Rodriguez (as Mayumi), Michael V. (as Kukut), Allan K. (as Tarsir), and Jay Manalo (as Simakwel) as voice actors. Joey de Leon wrote the lyrics and the music was composed by Ogie Alcasid.

Minor planet 5749 Urduja discovered by Eleanor Helin is named in her honor. The official naming citation was published by the Minor Planet Center on 8 November 2019 (M.P.C. 117229).

She is portrayed by Sanya Lopez in the GMA Network primetime series Mga Lihim ni Urduja.

Urduja was depicted as queen of Zahiya-lachis in The Hurricane Wars

== See also ==
- Ibn Battuta
- Pangasinan
- Caboloan
- Tawalisi
- Benguet
- Ibaloi
