= Pangasinan Provincial Capitol =

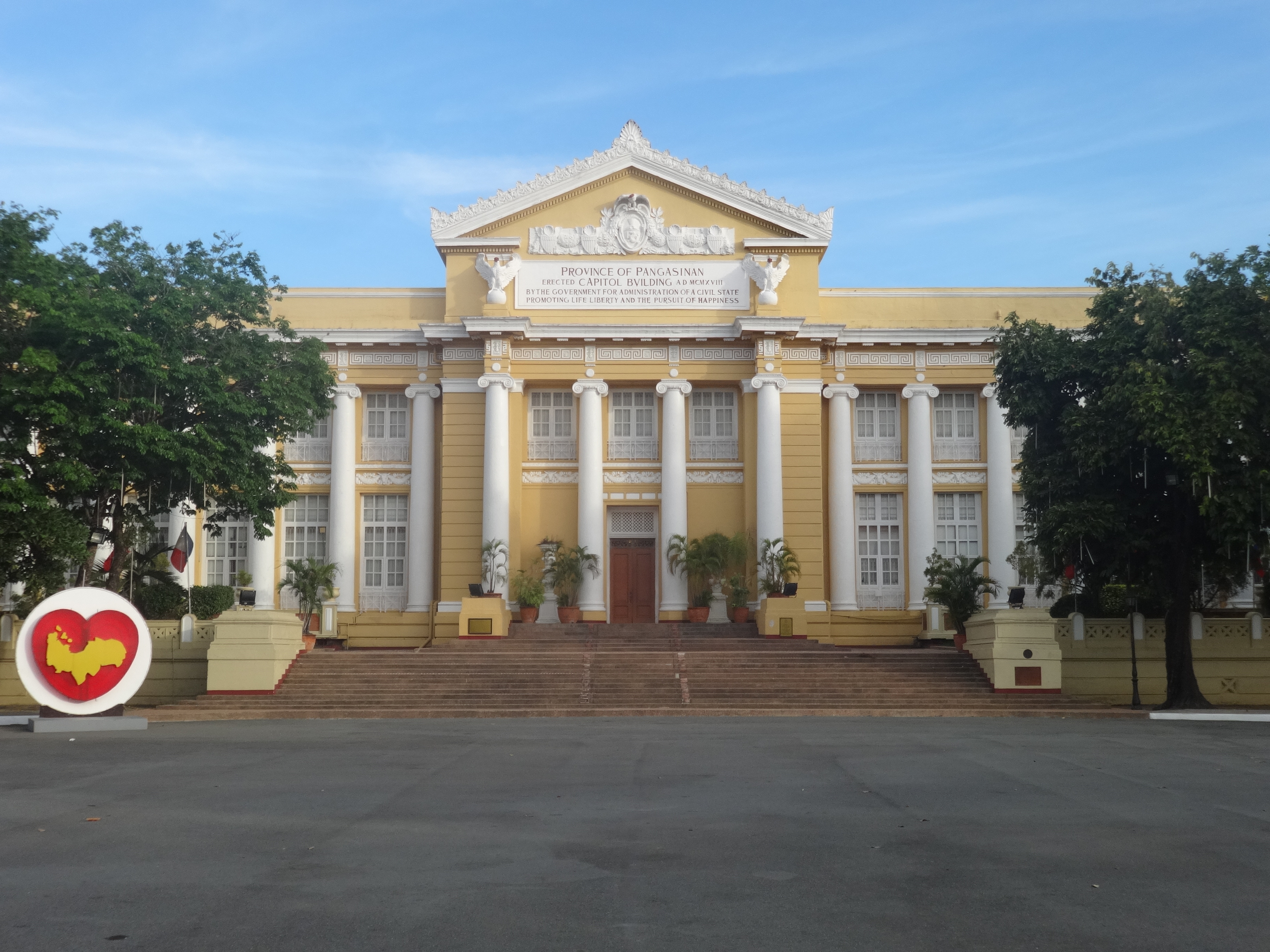
- Façade of the Capitol

- Location within Philippines
- Alternative names: Lingayen Capitol

General information
- Type: Government Building
- Architectural style: French Neo-classical
- Location: Lingayen, Pangasinan, Philippines
- Coordinates: 16.033513°N 120.231519°E
- Current tenants: Office of the Governor; Provincial Government of Pangasinan
- Groundbreaking: 1917
- Completed: 1918
- Renovated: Latest renovation in 2008

Technical details
- Floor count: two

Design and construction
- Architect: Ralph Harrington Doane
- Known for: One of the Eight Architectural Treasures in the Philippines

Website
- www.pangasinan.gov.ph

National Historical Landmarks
- Official name: Ang Paglunsad (1945)
- Type: Sites/Events
- Designated: March 15, 1975; 51 years ago
- Database: NHCP website

The Pangasinan Provincial Capitol, on Lingayen Gulf, is the present seat of the government of Pangasinan. It was declared as one of the eight Architectural Treasures of the Philippines by the National Commission for Culture and the Arts. Located in Lingayen, this government building was constructed during the term of the late Governor Daniel Maramba. On the central concave portion of its façade reads, an inscription says, "Province of Pangasinan. Erected Capitol Building AD MCMXVIII by the Government and Administration of Civil State promoting Life, Liberty, and Pursuit of Happiness."

The Pangasinan Provincial Capitol, noted for its neoclassical architectural style, remains one of the town’s most prominent landmarks and a symbol of provincial governance. The nearby Urduja House, completed in 1953, serves as the official residence of the governor and is named after the legendary figure Princess Urduja.

== History ==
The provincial capitol, designed by Daniel Burnham, was built on April 21, 1917, and was completed in 1918 with a budget of three hundred thousand pesos. Twenty five hectares of land was obtained by the provincial government and the construction was led by the seventh governor of Pangasinan Daniel Maramba; Members Segundo Estaris and Victor Tomelden; Treasurer J.W. Crow; District Engineer Chas Dandors; and Consulting Architect Ralph Harrington Doane.

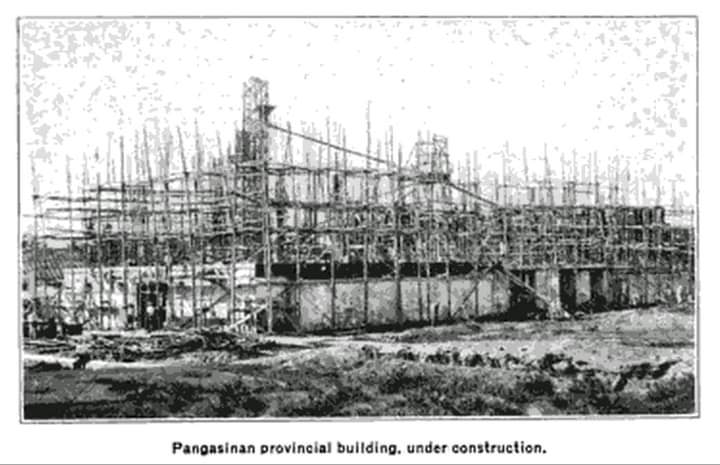
Earlier construction of the provincial capitol

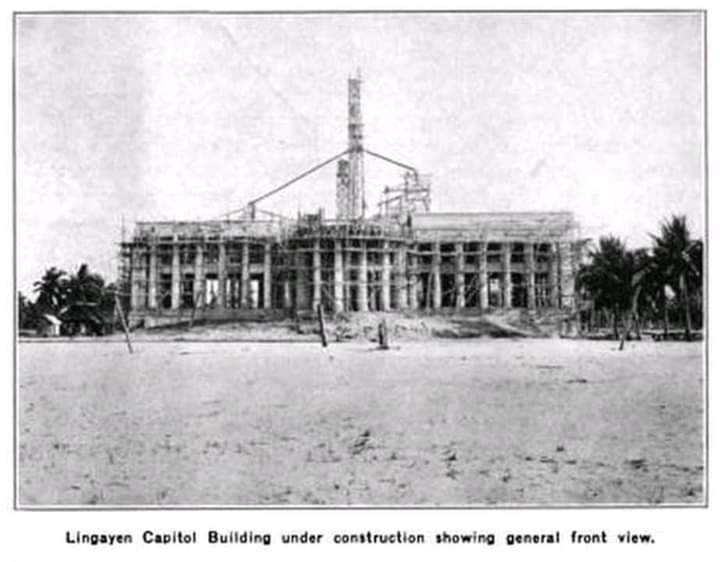
Pangasinan Provincial Capitol under construction showing general front view

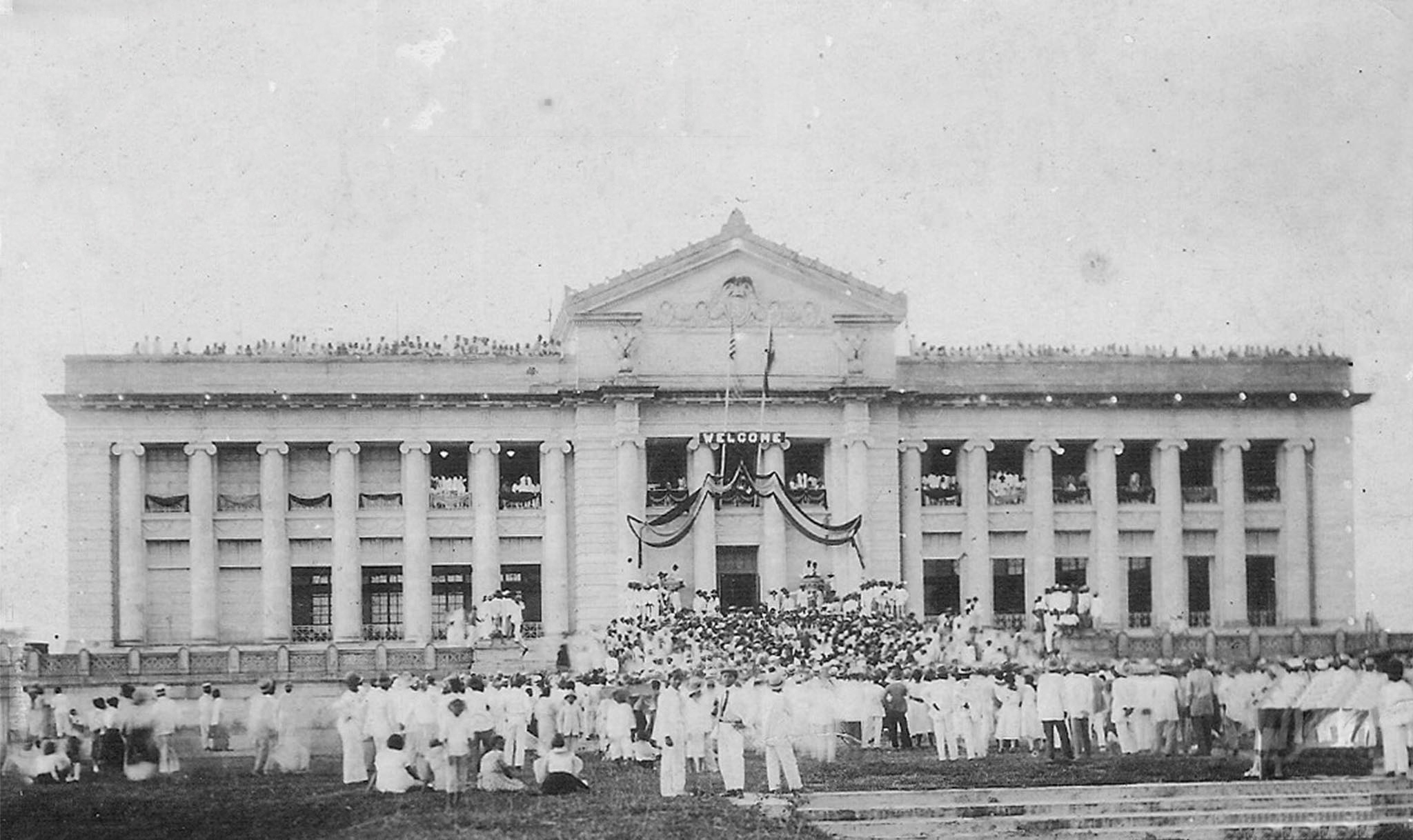
Inauguration of the Pangasinan Provincial Capitol, 1918

During World War II it was severely damaged and in 1949, it was reconstructed by the provincial board led by the fourteenth governor of Pangasinan Enrique Braganza; Members Vicente Soliven and Miguel de Vera; Treasurer A.F. Buenaventura and District Engineer V.B. Oledan to its pre-war grandeur.

The second half of 2007 marks the commencement of significant changes in the physical appearance and systematic clustering of provincial government buildings, parks, hospitals, and satellite offices. The intensive rehabilitation and repair of the provincial capitol building gained national fame and recognition upon its completion in 2008, earning for it the title “Best Provincial Capitol in the Philippines”. Simultaneous to the renovation of the physical infrastructure of the province, human resource improvement was implemented through programs which resulted to the restoration of dignity, self-respect and professionalism of provincial government employees as working force partners in Pangasinan's development. It was during this term of Governor Amado T. Espino, Jr. that the founding day of Pangasinan was established, celebrating its 430th founding anniversary for the first time on April 5, 2010. Pangasinan's Golden age took off from this year which saw numerous investments flowing into the province, significant development projects mushrooming in every corner, local, national and international linkages being established, all for Pangasinan's progress and advancement, and finally breaking ground on a period where Pangasinenses proudly claim that their Province is the best place to invest, live, work and raise a family. Consequently, under the administration of Governor Amado I. Espino III, the provincial government of Pangasinan celebrated the Provincial Capitol's CENTENNIAL ANNIVERSARY in December 2018.

== Architecture ==
The building was made of poured concrete with limestone on the exterior to display its warm color. Part of the plan was to include a court house, jail, garage, storeroom, hospital and residences for the governor and provincial treasures.

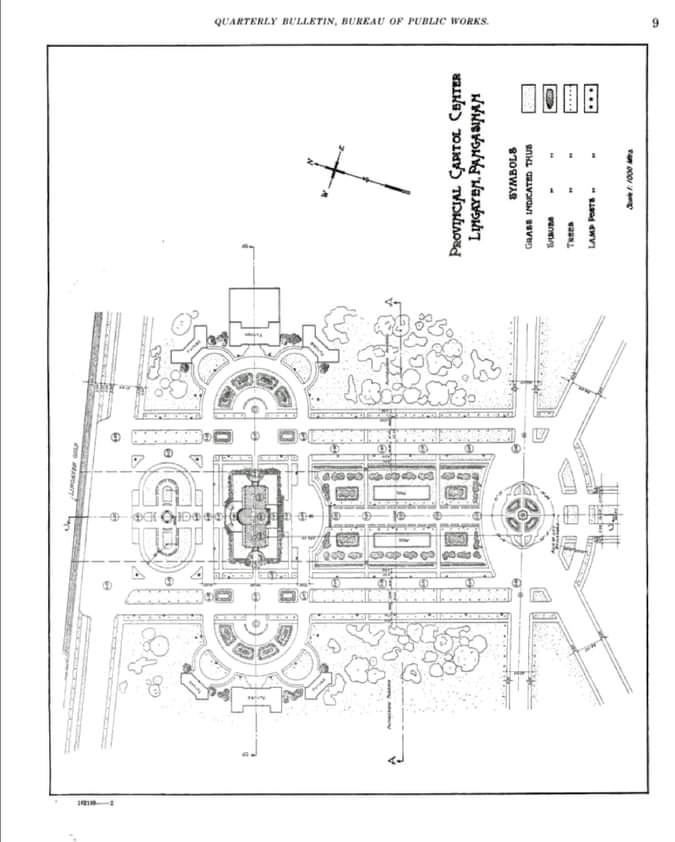
Proposed layout map designed of the capitol.

The entire building is rectangular in plan with two to three stories in height, and set on a podium with several steps. At the center of the façade is the entrance with several doors sheltered by a canopy. The exterior has minimum wall surfaces but maximum window openings to bring in cool sea breeze. The entire structure is guarded from the sun and rain by its colonnade and projecting cornices surrounding the buildings. Inside are big rooms that had high ceilings and large windows were lined along wide corridors, giving an impression of an open pavilion. The architecture style is marked by the use of columns, entablatures and pediments. To make it an enhanced capitol building, the plan used two stories with a monumental main floor lobby and court room on the second floor.

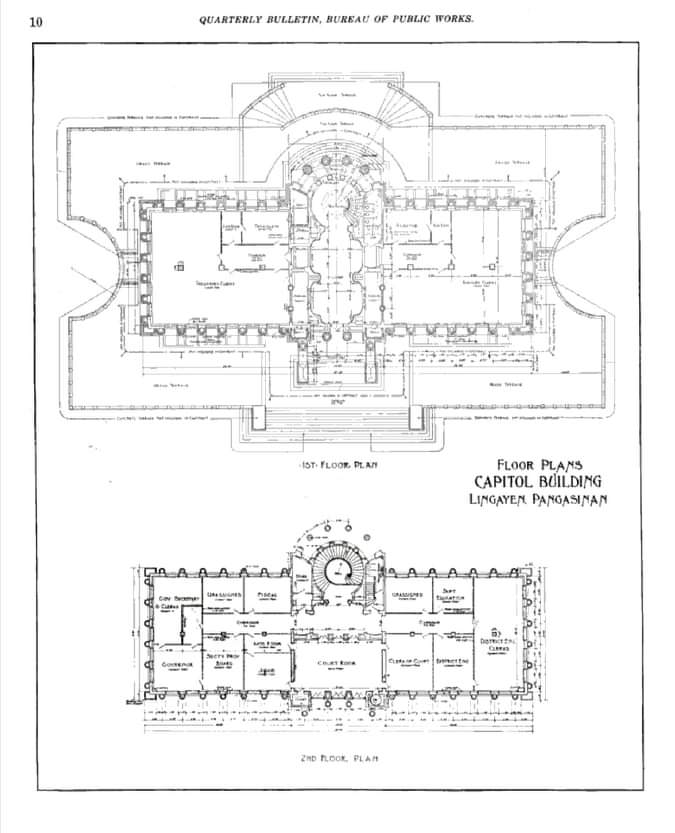
Floorplan

== Gallery ==
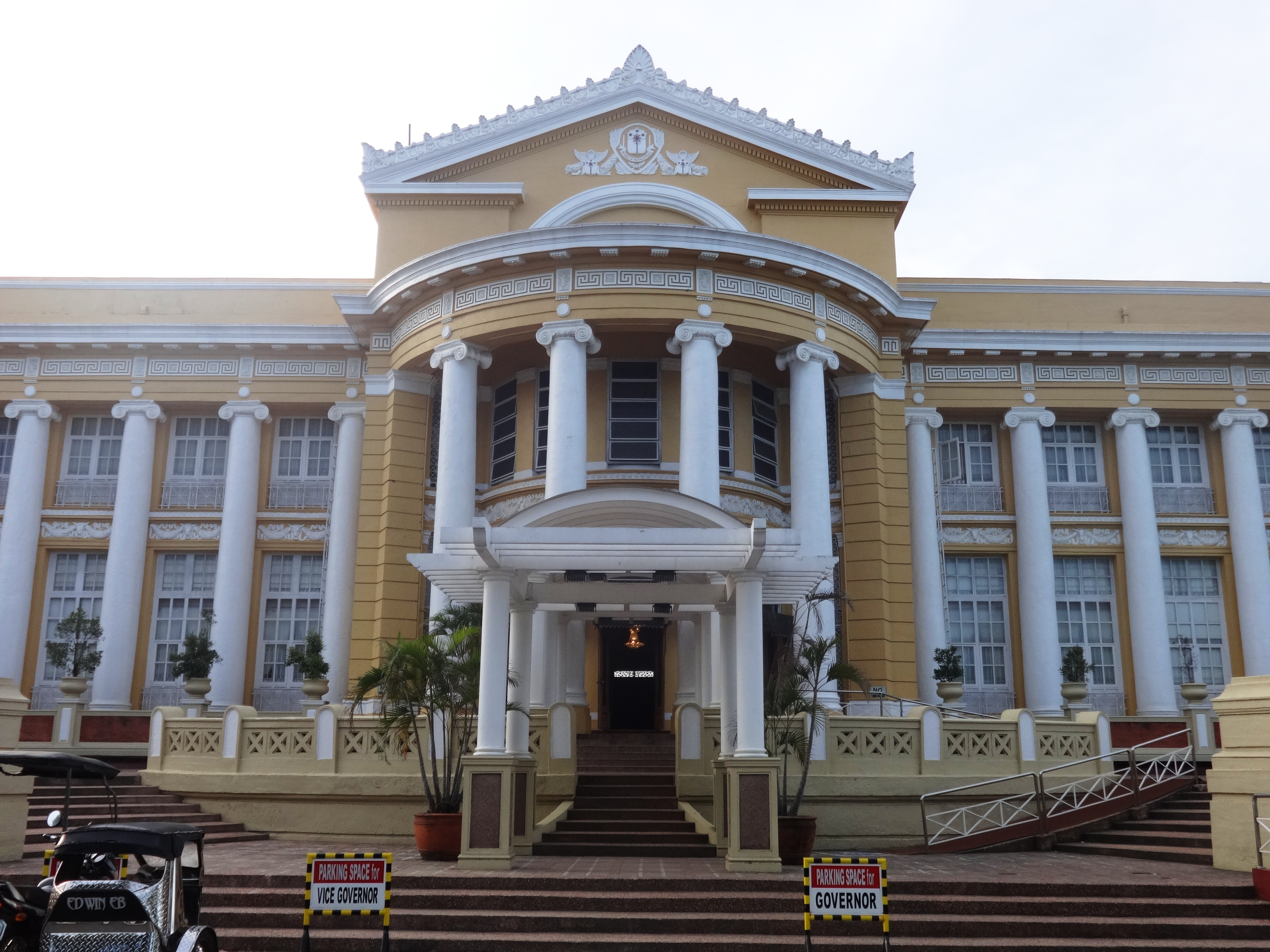
Back view

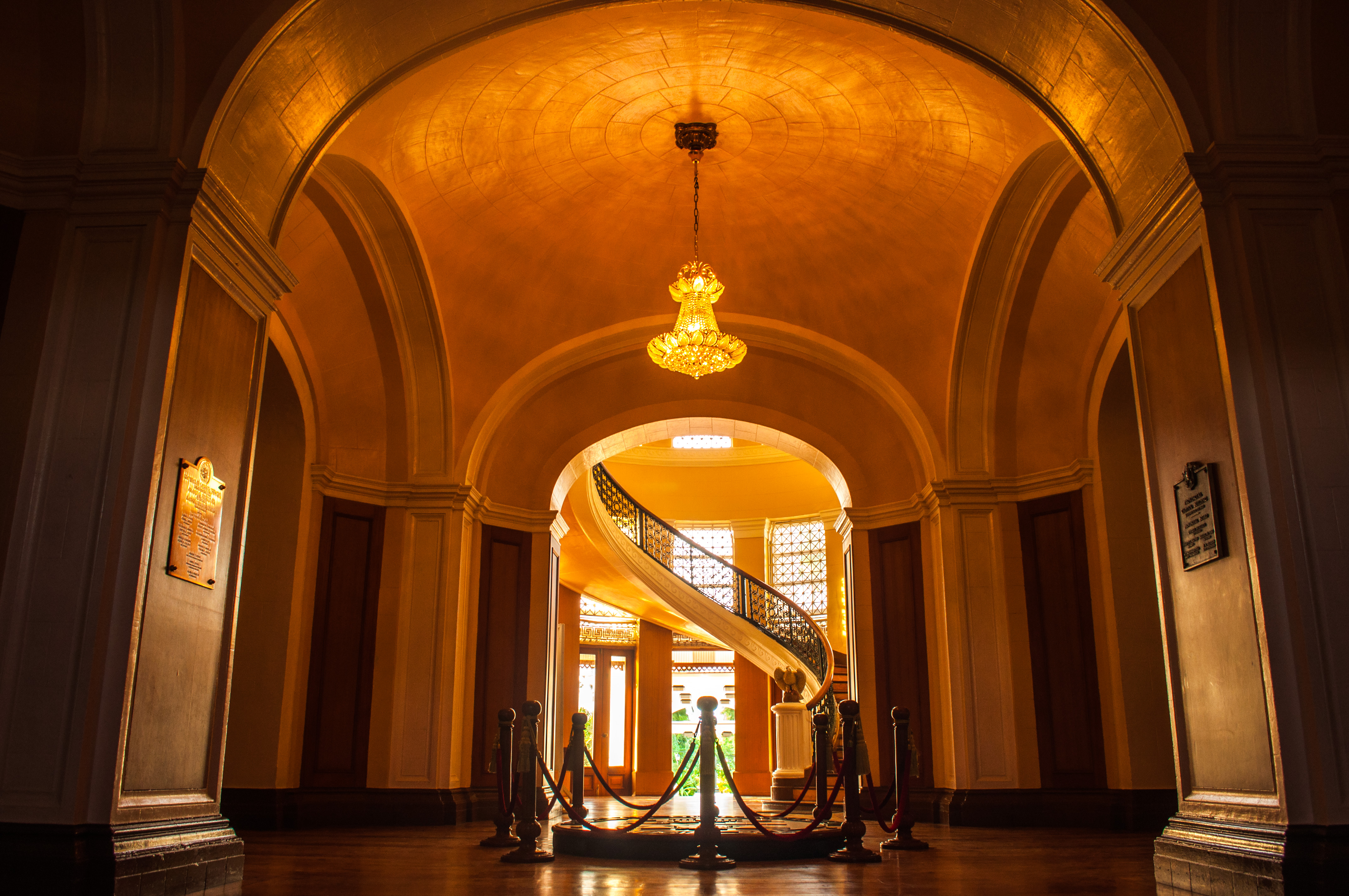
Interior

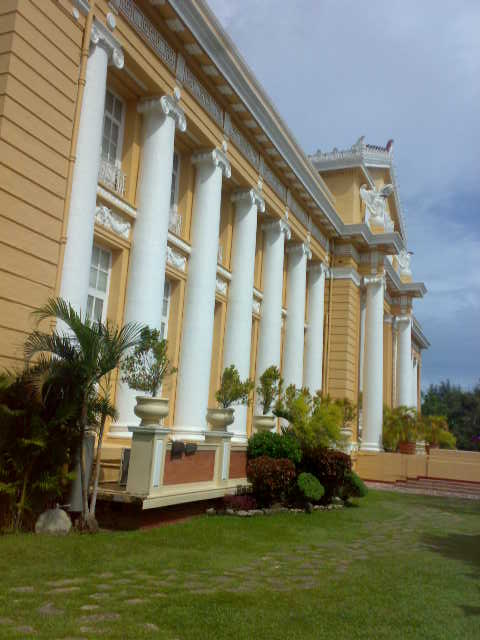
Side View

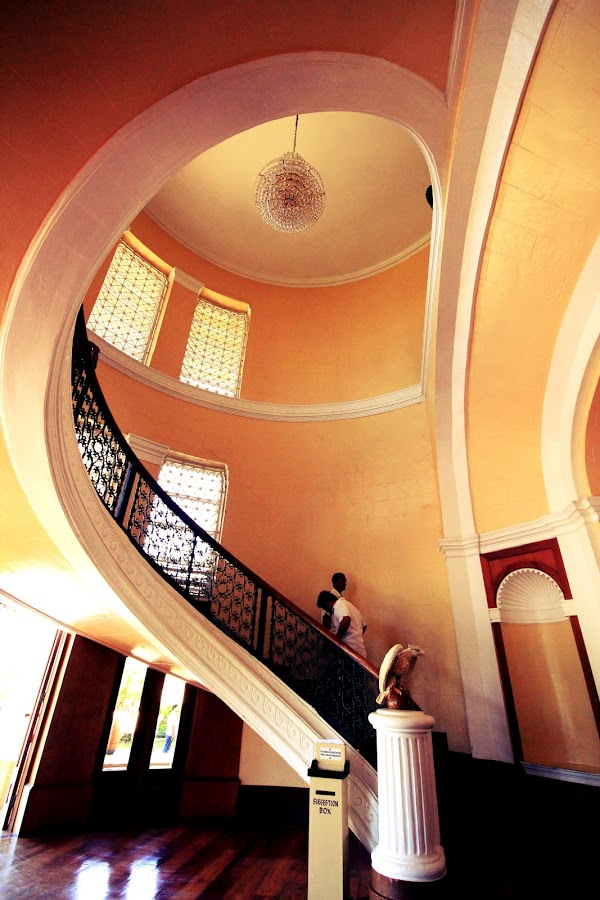
Staircase

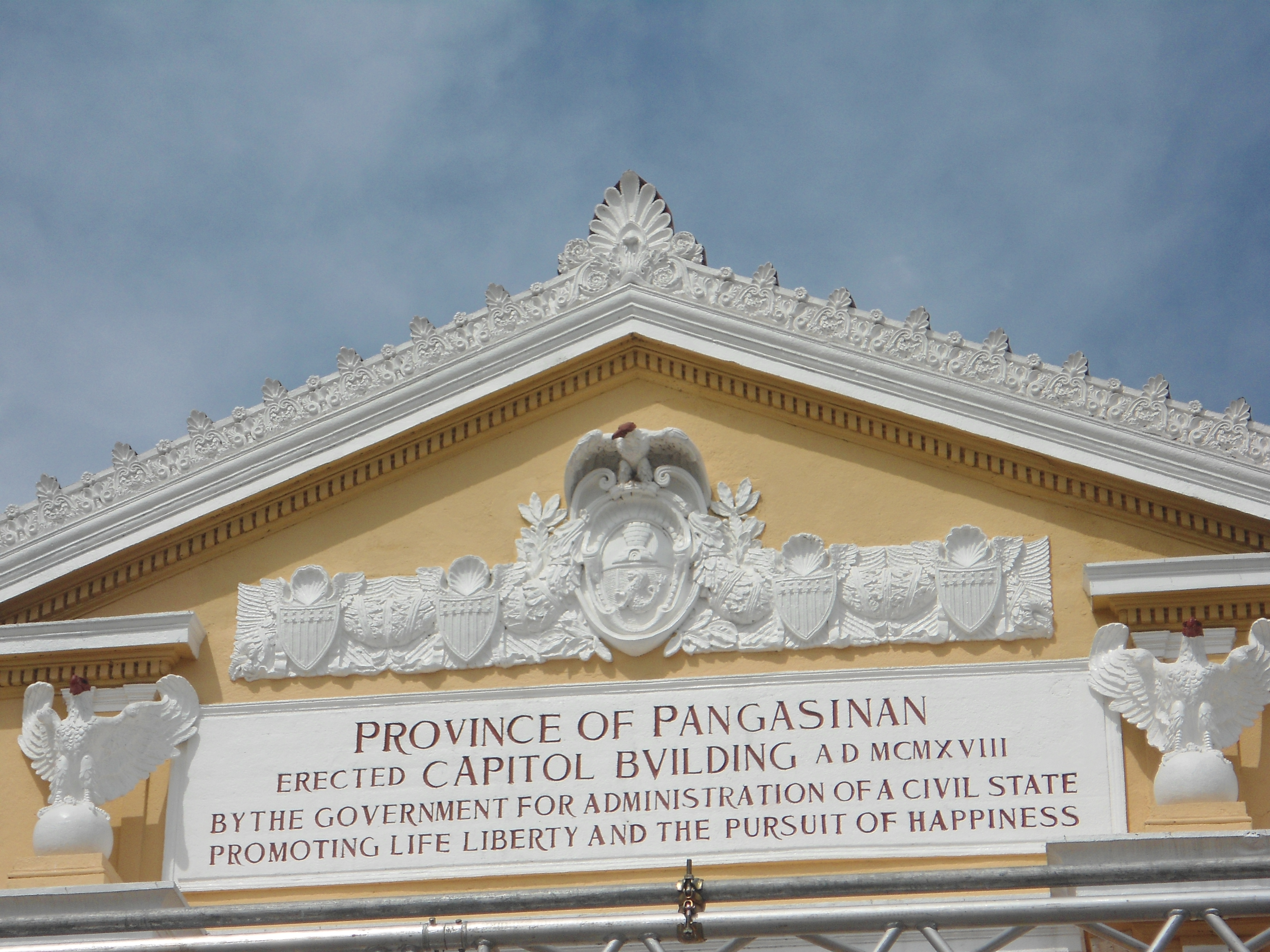
Pediment
