= Casa Real (Lingayen) =

Historic building in Pangasinan, Philippines

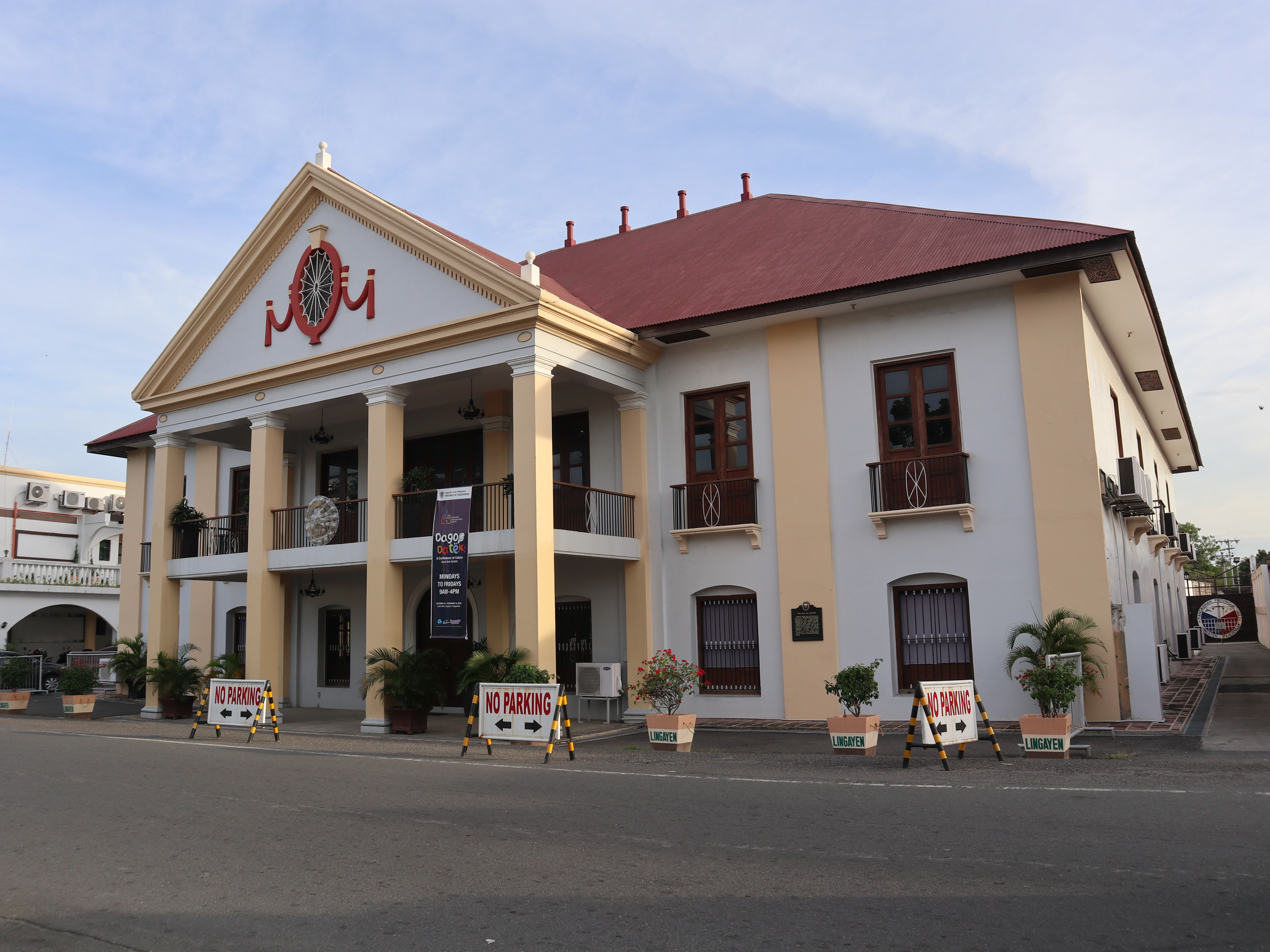
- Facade of the building in 2022

- Location within Philippines

General information
- Status: Fully restored
- Location: Lingayen, Pangasinan, Philippines
- Coordinates: 16.019805°N 120.230341°E
- Groundbreaking: 1840s
- Renovated: circa 2015

National Historical Landmarks
- Official name: Casa Real ng Lingayen
- Type: Buildings/Structures
- Designated: June 21, 2021; 5 years ago
- Database: NHCP website

Casa Real (Royal House) is one of the oldest public buildings and served as the provincial seat of government of Lingayen, Pangasinan, in the Philippines during the Spanish colonial period. It was where the alcalde mayor held office as the provincial governor and the judge of the Court of First Instance. It was declared a National Landmark by the National Historical Commission of the Philippines and noted it as "an outstanding and unique example of civil architecture from the Spanish and American colonial periods". Local offices that were housed by the building abandoned it when Typhoon "Cosme" ripped off its roof in 2008. Since 2023, the building houses the Banaan Pangasinan Provincial Museum.

== History ==
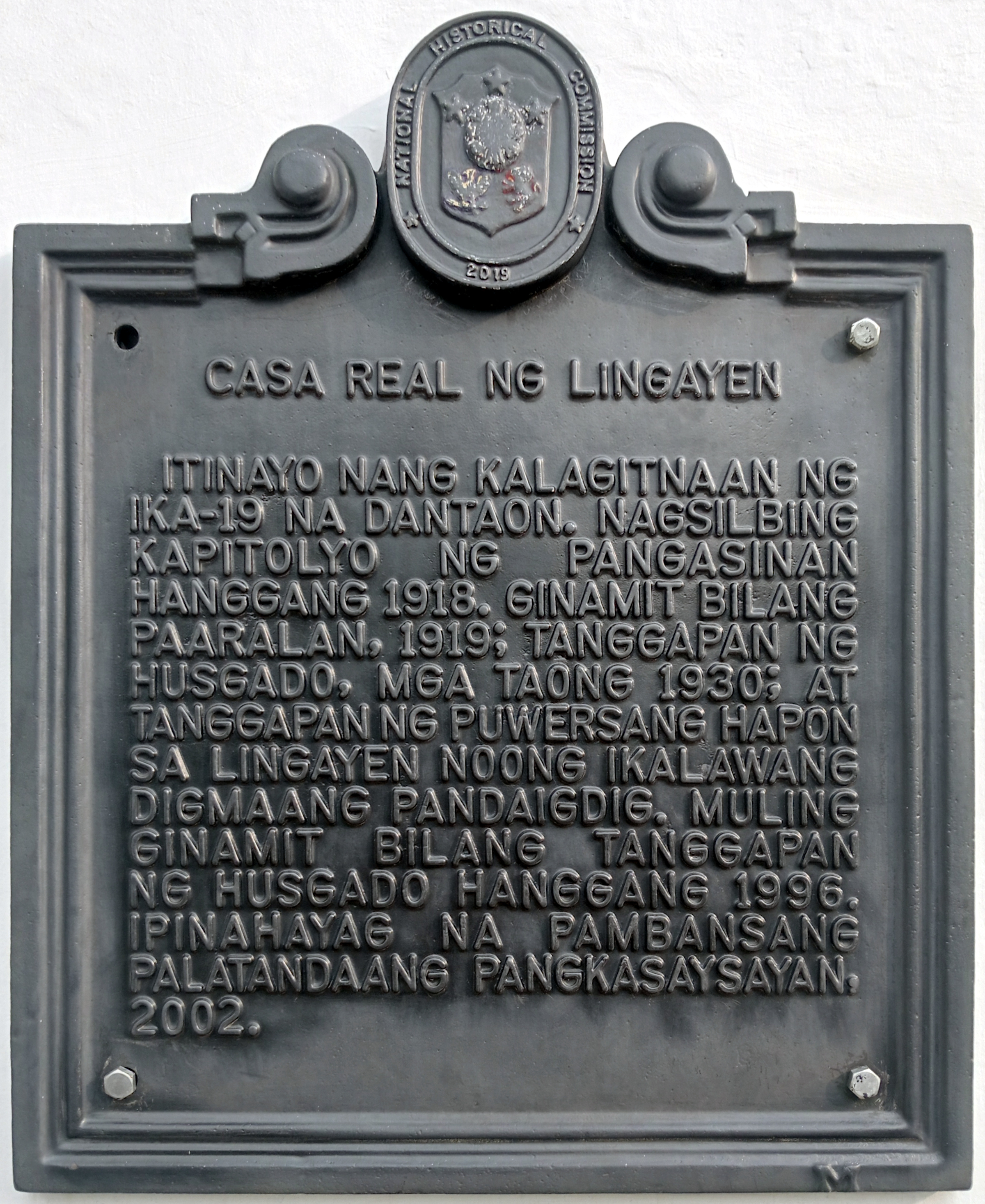
Historical marker unveiled in 2021

In the 1840s, the 1,480-square-meter, two-story Casa Real made of stone masonry and bricks, which stands at the municipal plaza, was constructed. It also became the station of Spanish soldiers and their native recruits when they fought the Katipuneros.

During the American period, it was called 'capitol' and served as the office of the governor. When Judge William Howard Taft and his commissioners went to Lingayen, Pangasinan, they were given a grand reception at Casa Real on February 16, 1901. This happened after the Taft Commission organized Pangasinan as a civil province. In 1918, the seat of the provincial government was eventually transferred to what is now the Pangasinan Provincial Capitol Building.

In the 1930s, Casa Real was used as an elementary school, then as a Juzgado and, later, as offices of the municipal government.

Casa Real survived the damages brought by World War II. However, in 2008, Tropical Storm Cosme damaged the building, blowing away its roof.

Since 2023, the structure houses the Banaan Pangasinan Provincial Museum.

== Renovations ==
As early as 2012, the provincial government of Lingayen, Pangasinan, had planned on renovating the once seat of power of the north. Five million pesos was allocated for its initial phase of renovation, to turn the currently inhabitable building into a museum that would house old books, documents, artifacts, archaeological relics and other memoirs of historical and cultural values of Pangasinan during the Spanish and American periods. Pangasinan Representative Leopoldo Bataoil proposed the allocation of thirty million pesos from 2015's national budget to add to its initial funding.
