= Colegio del Santissimo Rosario (Lingayen) =

Defunct Roman Catholic school in Pangasinan, Philippines

Colegio dela Nuestra Señora del Santissimo Rosario
- Colegio del Santissimo Rosario
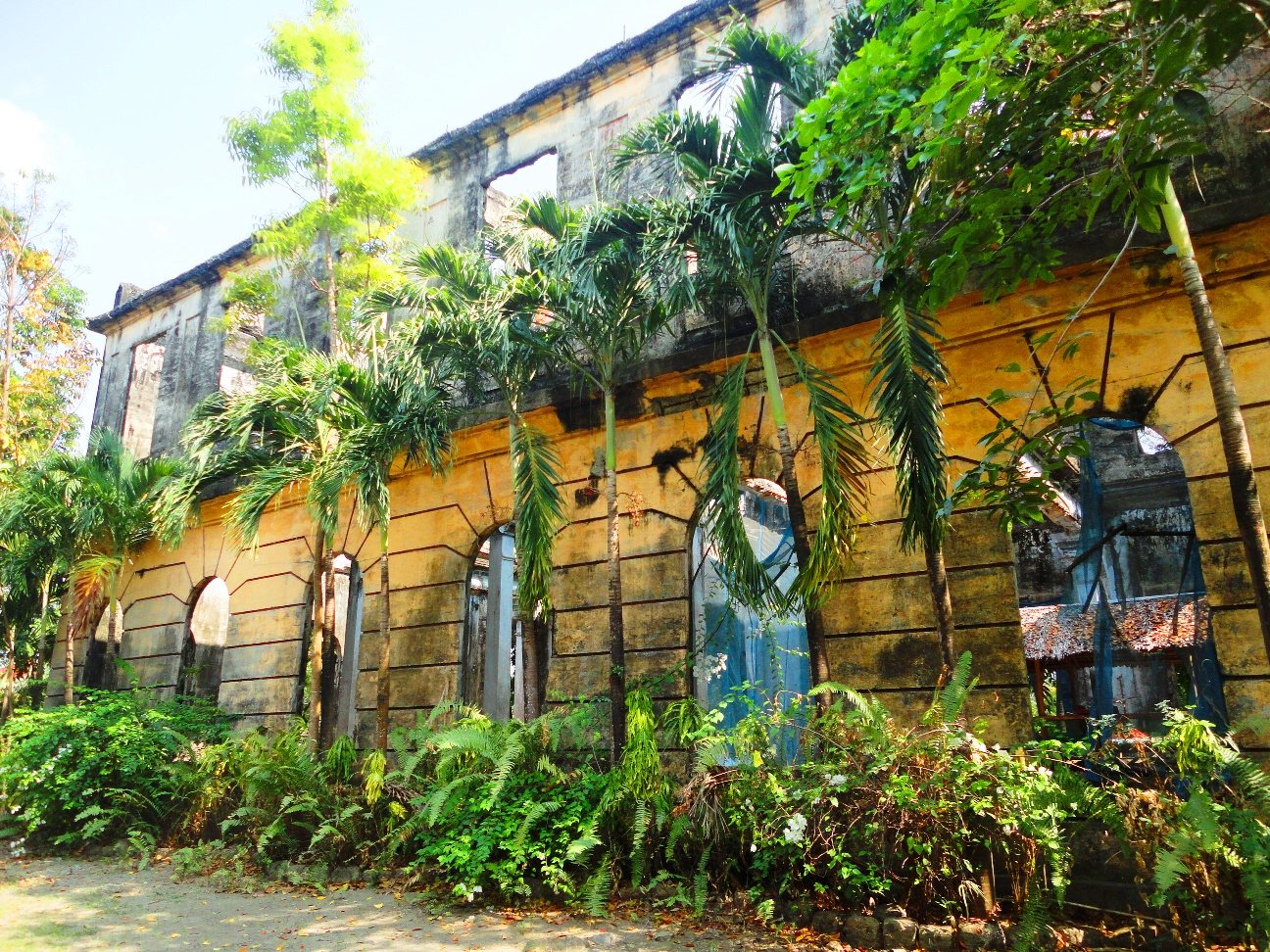
- Type: Private, Roman Catholic, Dominican
- Established: 1890
- Location: Philippines; 16°01′16″N 120°13′25″E
- Campus: 1 hectare
- Location in Luzon Location in the Philippines

The Colegio dela Nuestra Señora del Santissimo Rosario (School of Our Lady of the Most Holy Rosary) was an exclusive school run by Dominican sisters for girls. Constructed in 1890, the school occupied one hectare of land and was composed of a dormitory for schoolgirls, a clausura for the nuns, and a chapel.

== History ==
From 1912 to 1913, Fray Roque Ruaño was tasked to design the pavilion for the Colegio del Santissimo Rosario. The architecture follows Ruaño's design of the University of Santo Tomas in Sampaloc.

The Colegio was used as barracks for two years by the Americans during World War II, during which the nuns evacuated to Dagupan. In the aftermath of the war, the Colegio was badly damaged and was never rebuilt. Eventually, the property was ceded by the Dominican sisters to Bishop Mariano Madriaga to be used by the Columban sisters.

For the construction of another school in San Manuel town, the Dominican sisters took out the materials used to build the Colegio, leaving only the walls and the framework of the edifice.

The ruins gained much significance following the announcement to canonize Maria Beatriz del Rosario Arroyo, founder of the Dominican Sisters of the Most Holy Rosary of the Philippines and who lived and taught at the Colegio for five years.
