= Metro Baguio =

Metro BLISTT Metro Baguio
- Metropolitan area
- Metropolitan Baguio - La Trinidad - Itogon - Sablan - Tuba and Tublay
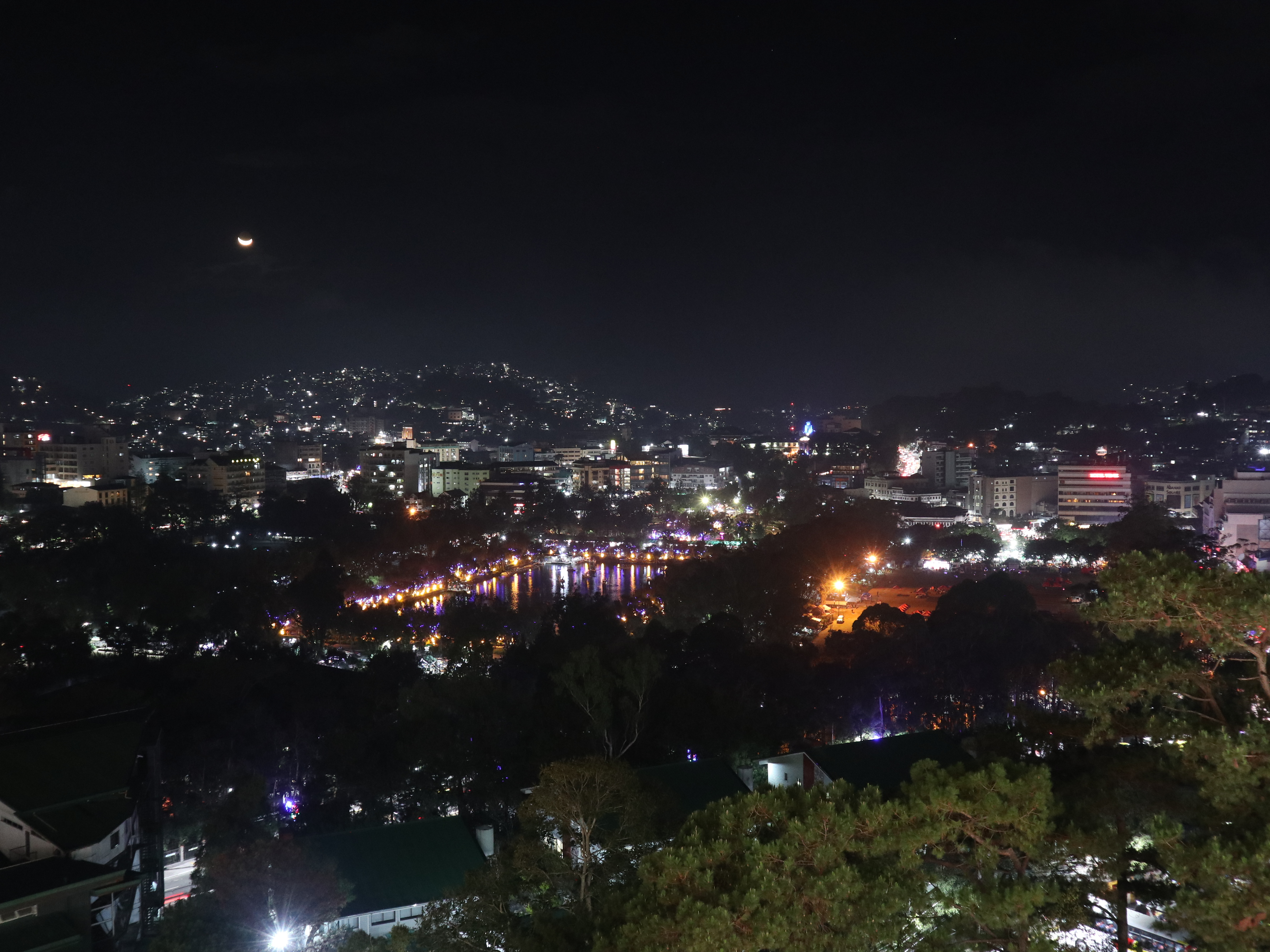
- Skyline of Baguio City at night

- Baguio and neighboring towns which is regarded as part of Metro Baguio.
- Country: Philippines
- Region: Cordillera Administrative Region (CAR)
- Province: Benguet
- Managing entity: Metropolitan Baguio City, La Trinidad, Itogon, Sablan, Tuba and Tublay Development Authority (MBLISTTDA)
- Established: April 11, 2004
- Metropolitan Center: Baguio
- City/Municipality: List: Baguio; La Trinidad; Itogon; Sablan; Tuba; Tublay

Government
  - Type: Council
  - Chairman: Benjamin Magalong (mayor of Baguio)
  - Co-Chairman: Arthur Baldo (mayor of Sablan)
  - Treasurer: Edna Tabanda (mayor of La Trinidad)
  - Secretary: Ruben Paoad (mayor of Tublay)

Area
  - Total: 1,094.79 km^{2} (422.70 sq mi)
- Elevation: 500 to 1,850 m (1,640 to 6,070 ft)

Population (2024)
  - Total: 653,677
  - Density: 597.080/km^{2} (1,546.43/sq mi)
- Time zone: UTC+8 (PST)
- Area Code: +63 74
- Website: Official Facebook page

Metro BLISTT , also known as Metro Baguio, is an agglomeration of the city of Baguio and five municipalities of the Philippine province of Benguet, namely: La Trinidad, Itogon, Sablan, Tuba, and Tublay. It is an official metropolitan area in the Philippines through Republic Act (RA) No. 11932 which lapsed into law on July 30, 2022 creating the Metropolitan Baguio City, La Trinidad, Itogon, Sablan, Tuba and Tublay Development Authority (MBLISTTDA) as a government entity with corporate powers.

Long proposed and supported by the NEDA-Regional Development Council-Cordillera, it was previously defined between 2007 and 2017 as one of twelve metropolitan areas in the Philippines. The original "BLIST" long existed as a concept since its inception in August 1990, a month after the 1990 earthquake which devastated the city of Baguio and other surrounding areas, and only existed as an informal reference to the area. The concept was later amended into "BLISTT" in 2009, which included the municipality of Tublay, despite not being adjacent to the city of Baguio. It was officially established after a signing of a memorandum of agreement by the mayors of the component local government units.

== Component local government units ==
BLISTT, like Metro Manila and Metro Cebu, is not an administrative political unit but an agglomeration of independent local government units (LGUs), the third level government in the Philippine political system.

Location	City/Municipality	Image	Population (2010)	Area (km^{2})	Pop. density (per km^{2})	Income classification
	Baguio		318,676	57.5	5,542	1st Class
	La Trinidad		107,188	82.74	1,295.48	1st Class
	Itogon		55,960	450	124.4	1st Class
	Sablan		10,511	106	99.2	5th Class
	Tuba		42,874	296	144.84	1st Class
	Tublay		16,555	102.55	161.433	5th Class
BLISTT			551,764	1094.79	503.9907	-

== History ==
The original BLIST concept was visualized by the key stakeholders in August 1990 after the 1990 Luzon earthquake devastated Baguio. Supported by a European Union grant in 1992, the BLIST Urban Plan was completed in 1994, which aimed to reconstruct the city following the earthquake and to reduce overcrowding in the city. The concept was not supported by the component Benguet municipalities of La Trinidad, Itogon, Sablan, and Tuba such that it was prepared with little consultation, and was primarily developed for the sole convenience of Baguio.

In 2009, the municipality of Tublay in the province of Benguet was included in the new BLISTT plan as revived by the Regional Development Council of the Cordillera Administrative Region (RDC-CAR).

The original BLIST in the province of Benguet	The new BLISTT which includes Tublay

The concept had long been pushed through by the city government of Baguio, for the prime purpose of alleviating the city's overpopulation and decongestion problems. It was criticized by other government officials as heavily geared towards the alleviating of the problems of Baguio.

It was officially established after a signing of a memorandum of agreement by the mayors of the component LGUs. The first set of council officials were elected on February 27, 2014, with Baguio Mayor Mauricio Domogan as chairman, Sablan Mayor Arthur Baldo as co-chairman, La Trinidad Mayor Edna Tabanda as Treasurer, and Tublay Mayor Ruben Paoad as Secretary, all of whom would serve for a one-year term.

== Geography and climate ==
=== Geography ===
Most of the metropolitan area, like Baguio, is located some 1,500 meters above sea level, nestled within the Cordillera Central mountain range in northern Luzon. It covers a total area of 1094.79 square kilometers.

=== Climate ===
BLISTT features a subtropical highland climate under the Köppen climate classification. The area is known for its mild climate. Owing to its high elevation, the temperature is 8 degrees Celsius lower compared to the average temperature of the rest of the country. Average temperature ranges from 15 to 23 degrees Celsius. It is usually lower during the late and early months of the year. The lowest recorded temperature in Baguio was 6.3 degrees Celsius on January 18, 1961. This is in contrast to the all-time high of 30.4 degrees Celsius recorded on March 15, 1988, during the 1988 El Niño season. Baguio seldom exceeds 26 degrees Celsius even during the warmest part of the year. Like many other cities with a subtropical highland climate, BLISTT sees noticeably less precipitation during its “low-sun” months. The metropolitan area though sees an extraordinary amount of precipitation during its wetter months, with the months of July and August seeing on average more than 1,000 mm of rain. BLISTT averages over 4500 mm of precipitation annually.

Climate data for Baguio, Philippines
Month	Jan	Feb	Mar	Apr	May	Jun	Jul	Aug	Sep	Oct	Nov	Dec	Year
Record high °C (°F)	26 (79)	27 (81)	28 (82)	29 (84)	27 (81)	27 (80)	27 (80)	27 (80)	26 (79)	27 (81)	27 (80)	27 (80)	29 (84)
Mean daily maximum °C (°F)	22 (72)	23 (73)	24 (76)	25 (77)	24 (76)	24 (75)	22 (71)	22 (71)	22 (71)	23 (73)	23 (74)	23 (74)	23 (74)
Mean daily minimum °C (°F)	13 (55)	13 (56)	14 (58)	16 (60)	16 (61)	16 (61)	16 (60)	16 (60)	16 (60)	16 (60)	15 (59)	14 (57)	15 (59)
Record low °C (°F)	6 (43)	8 (47)	11 (52)	10 (50)	14 (57)	12 (53)	12 (54)	13 (55)	14 (57)	11 (52)	9 (49)	8 (46)	6 (43)
Average precipitation mm (inches)	22.86 (0.90)	22.86 (0.90)	43.18 (1.70)	109.2 (4.30)	401.3 (15.80)	436.9 (17.20)	1,074.4 (42.30)	1,160.8 (45.70)	713.7 (28.10)	381 (15.0)	124.5 (4.90)	50.8 (2.00)	4,541.5 (178.80)
Source: http://www.weatherbase.com/weather/weather.php3?s=082389&refer=

== Government ==
Unlike Metro Manila, BLISTT, before the signing of the MOA, didn't have a government that directly administered the area. However, on February 27, 2014, the first set of council officials were elected, with Baguio Mayor Mauricio Domogan as chairman, Sablan Mayor Arthur Baldo as co-chairman, La Trinidad Mayor Edna Tabanda as Treasurer, and Tublay Mayor Ruben Paoad as Secretary, all of whom would serve for a one-year term.

== Media ==
All Metro Baguio's Radio and Television stations, Cable and Satellite TV providers and broadcast transmitters and Local Newspapers.

AM Stations

- DZWT Radyo Totoo 540 (DZWT; Catholic Media Network)
- DZWX Bombo Radyo 1035 (DZWX; Bombo Radyo Philippines/People's Broadcasting Service)
- RPN DZBS Radyo Ronda 1368 (DZBS; Radio Philippines Network)

FM Stations

- 89.5 Star FM (DWIM; Bombo Radyo Philippines/People's Broadcasting Service)
- RJ FM 91.1 (relay station of RJFM Manila) (DWDJ; Rajah Broadcasting Network)
- 91.9 Easy Rock (DZYS; Manila Broadcasting Company)
- Barangay FM 92.7 (DWRA; GMA Network, Inc.)
- DZEQ Radyo Pilipinas 93.7 (DZEQ; Presidential Broadcast Service)
- 94.3 FM Radio (Philippine Collective Media Corporation)
- 95.1 Love Radio (DWMB; Manila Broadcasting Company)
- 95.9 Big Sound FM (DWBG; Capricom Production and Management/Vanguard Radio Network)
- 96.7 K-Lite (DWSK; Beta Broadcasting System)
- Cool 97.5 (DWLY; UBC Media, Inc.)
- 98.7 Z-Radio (DWUB; Sphere Entertainment)
- 99.9 Country (DZWR; Catholic Media Network)
- 102.3 FM Radio (relay station of FM Radio Manila) (DZYB; Nation Broadcasting Corporation and Philippine Collective Media Corporation)
- MOR 103.1 (defunct) (DZRR; ABS-CBN Corporation)
- iFM 103.9 (DWHB; Radio Mindanao Network)
- 105.1 Brigada News FM (DZBM; Mareco Broadcasting Network/Brigada Mass Media Corporation)
- 107.1 MemoRieS FM (DZLL; Primax Broadcasting Network)

TV Stations

- ABS-CBN Baguio (defunct) (analog: Channel 3 and digital: channel 30)
- IBC Benguet (analog: Channel 6 and digital: channel 17)
- PTV Cordillera (Baguio) (analog: Channel 8 and digital: Channel 42)
- GMA Benguet (analog: Channel 10 and digital: Channel 38)
- RPN Benguet (analog: Channel 12 and digital: Channel 19)
- GTV Benguet (analog: Channel 22 and digital: Channel 38)
- Hope Channel Philippines Benguet (analog: Channel 24 and digital: Channel 44)
- BEAM TV Baguio Channel 26
- CLTV 36 (digital: Channel 36)
- TV5 Benguet (analog: Channel 28 and digital: Channel 51)
- ALLTV Baguio (analog: Channel 3 and digital: Channel 30)
- A2Z Benguet (digital: Channel 32)
- Light TV (digital: Channel 32)
- One Sports Benguet (analog: Channel 36 and digital: Channel 51)
- One Media (digital: Channel 44)
- DZRH News Television (digital Channel 25)
- DepEd TV Beaguet (digital Channel 41.7)
- TPN Digital Channel 45
- Net 25 Benguet (digital: Channel 25)
- INC TV Benguet (digital: Channel 46)

Cable & Satellite TV Providers

- Sky Cable Baguio - (Baguio & La Trinidad)
- Mountainview Satellite Corporation (defunct) - (Baguio, La Trinidad & Sablan)
- Liberty Cable TV Network - (Itogon & Tublay)
- A. B. Bejerano Cable TV - (Tuba)
- Cignal TV - (Metro Baguio)
- G Sat - (Metro Baguio)

Newspapers

- Baguio Midland Courier
- Sun Star Baguio
- Zig Zag Weekly
- Herald Express
- Amianan Balita Ngayon
- Philippine Daily Inquirer
- Manila Bulletin
- Tempo
- Balita
- The Philippine Star
- Pilipino Star Ngayon
- People's Journal

== Transportation ==
=== On land ===
Three main access roads lead to the city of Baguio from the lowlands; Kennon Road, Aspiras-Palispis Highway (formerly Marcos Highway), and Naguilian Road (also known as Quirino Highway). Kennon Road starts from Rosario in La Union province, and winds through a narrow, steep valley. Although perilous and being prone to landslides during rainy season, it is the fastest route to Baguio from the lowlands, and offers a scenic view. Aspiras Highway, which starts from Agoo, La Union and connects to Palispis Highway at Benguet-La Union highway border, and Naguilian Road, which starts from Bauang, La Union, are longer but safer routes than Kennon Road. For this, they are preferred by coaches, buses and lorries. All three major highways traverse the municipality of Tuba, also known as the "Gateway to Baguio". A significant portion of Naguilian Road covers the municipality of Sablan.

From Itogon, Baguio is connected by the Baguio-Bua-Itogon Road, while La Trinidad's main access route to the city is via the Halsema Highway (also known as the "Mountain Trail"), which leads north through the mountainous portion of the Cordillera Administrative Region. The municipality of Tublay, situated at the north of La Trinidad, is likewise traversed by the Halsema Highway.

Another access to Baguio from Aritao in the Nueva Vizcaya province passes through Itogon, but is less traveled. The road is not well-maintained, and public transportation through this route is not as regular.

Several bus lines link Baguio with Manila and the rest of the lowlands. Most transportation companies also offer express and air-conditioned buses at a much higher fare, though some minibuses offer cheaper fares. Bus services that operate in Baguio include Philippine Rabbit, Dangwa Tranco, Dagupan Bus, Pangasinan Solid North Transit. Victory Liner, Partas, Genesis, and Saulog Transit.

=== By air ===
Loakan Airport is the lone airport serving the general area. The airport is classified as a trunkline airport, or a major commercial domestic airport, by the Civil Aviation Authority of the Philippines, a body of the Department of Transportation and Communications that is responsible for the operations of not only this airport but also of all other airports in the Philippines except the major international airports. It is about 10 minutes by car from the city center going south. Due to the limited length of the runway which is 1,802 meters or 5,912 feet, it is restricted to commuter size aircraft. This perhaps contributed to the city's declining competitiveness against other medium-sized cities around the country. The airport is used primarily by helicopters, turbo-prop and piston engine aircraft, although on rare occasion light business jets (LBJ) have flown into the airport.

Loakan Airport reopened on December 16, 2022, with Philippine Airlines launching the first regular commercial flight to the airport in decades to and from Mactan–Cebu International Airport on the day of the reopening.
