= Mines View Park =

Overlook park in Baguio, Philippines

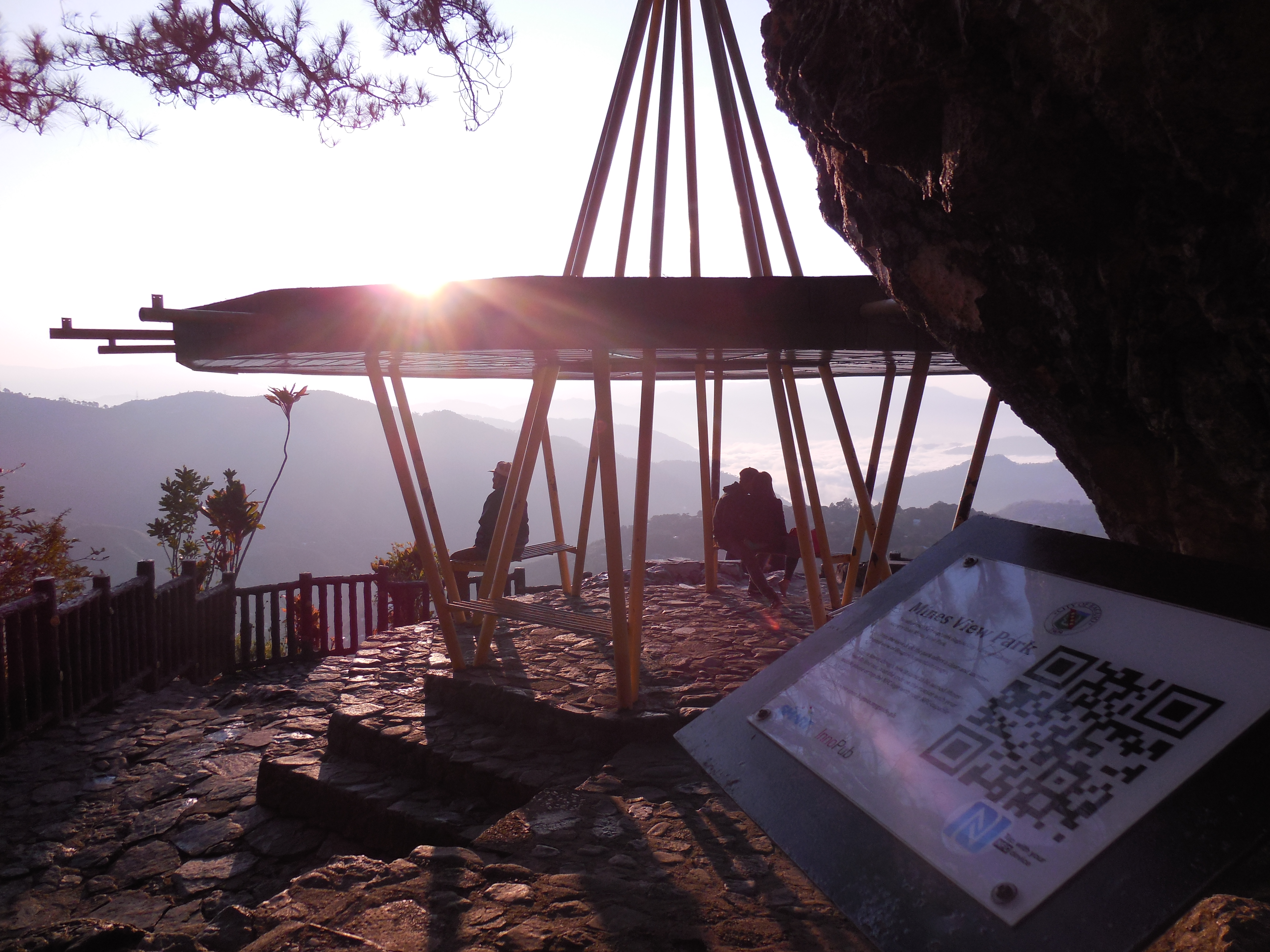
- Observation deck
- Interactive map of Mines View Park
- Location: Mines View Park (barangay), Baguio, Philippines
- Coordinates: 16°25′11″N 120°37′38″E
- Open: All year

Mines View Park is an overlook park on the northeastern outskirts of Baguio in the Philippines. Located on a land promontory 4 kilometres (2.5 mi) from downtown Baguio, the park overlooks the mining town of Itogon, particularly the abandoned gold and copper mines of the Benguet Corporation, and offers a glimpse of the Amburayan Valley. The observation deck is situated below a winding stone-covered stairway close to the parking area.

== Gallery ==
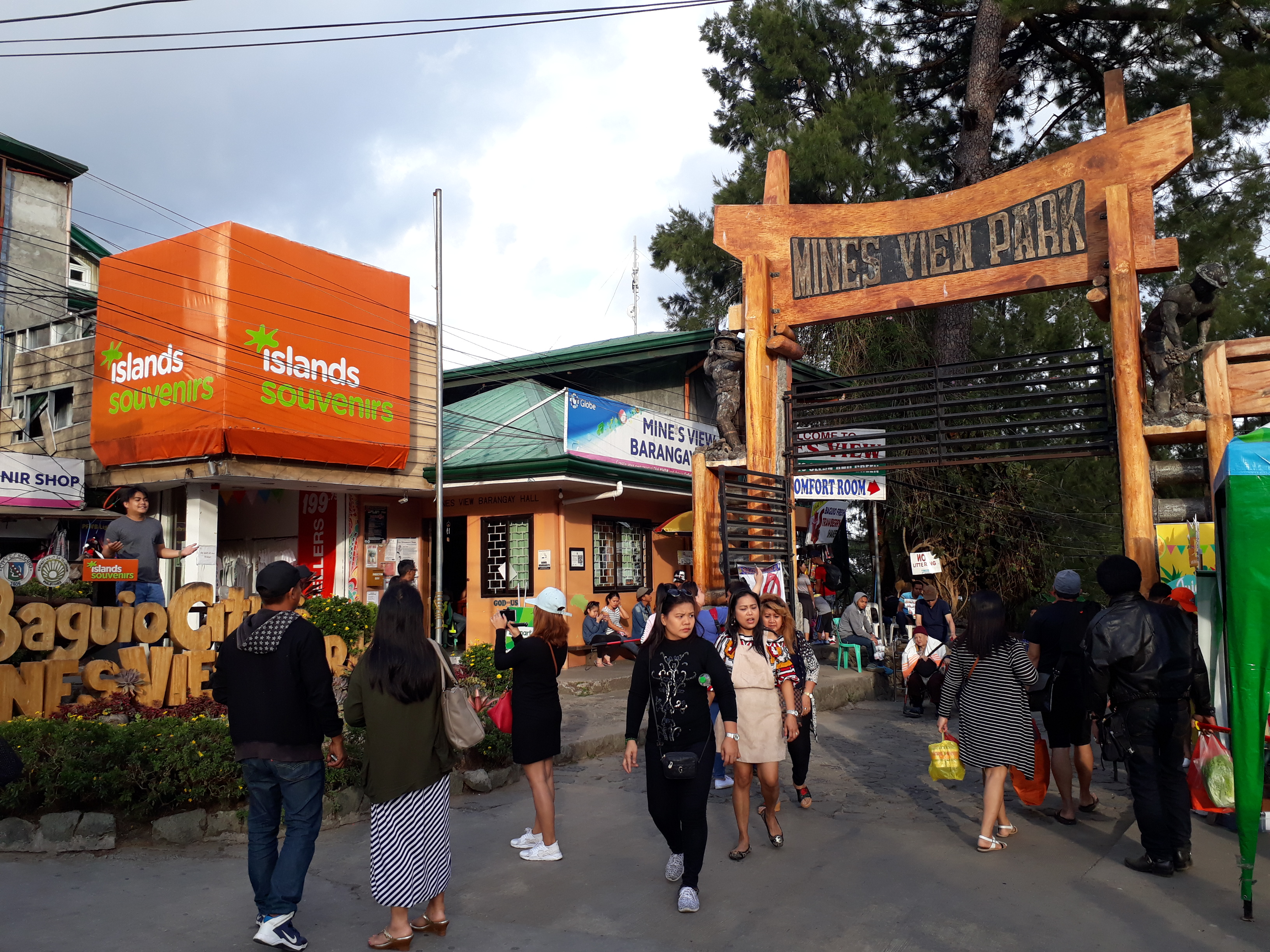
Park entrance

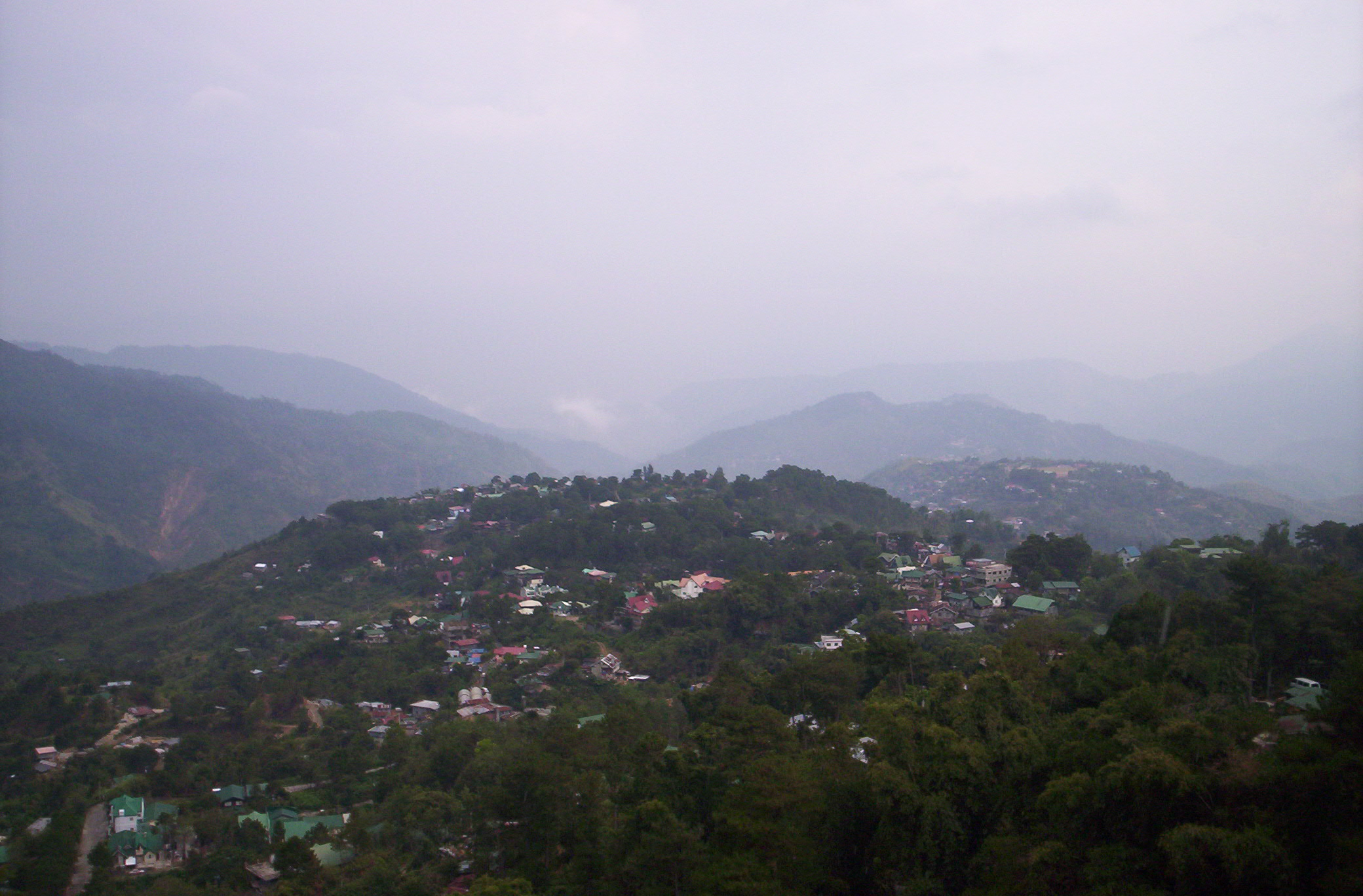
View from the Park

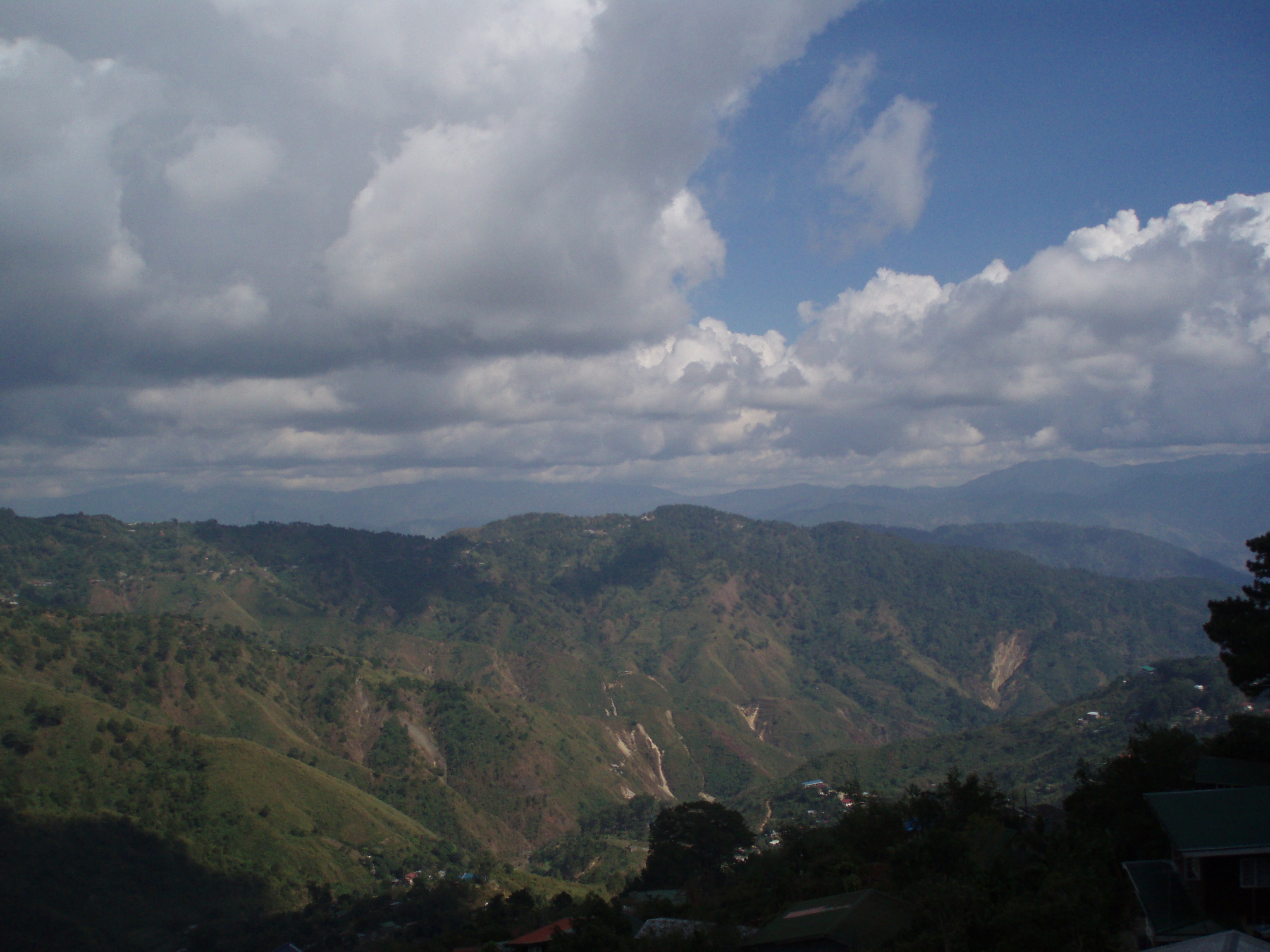
Another view from the Park

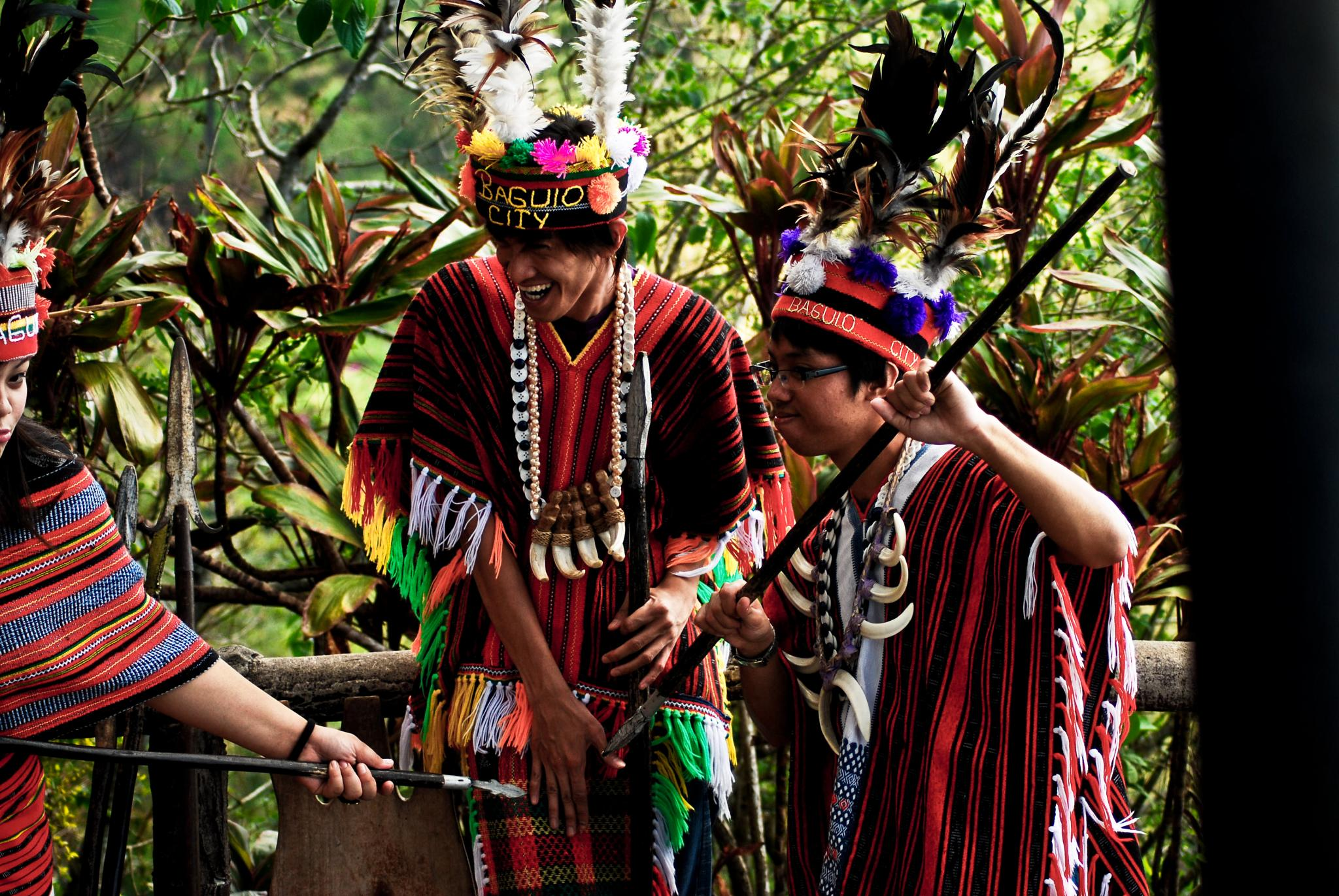
A local lets tourists try on their traditional attire
