= DWSL =

Radio station in Olongapo, Philippines

K-Lite Olongapo (DWSL)
- Olongapo; Philippines
- Broadcast area: Zambales, Bataan, and surrounding areas
- Frequency: 96.7 MHz
- Branding: 96.7 K-Lite

Programming
- Language: English
- Format: Adult Top 40
- Network: K-Lite
- Affiliations: Voice of America (VOA1 block)

Ownership
- Owner: Beta Broadcasting System
- Sister stations: DWHL Apo Radyo

History
- First air date: 1978

Technical information
- Licensing authority: NTC
- Power: 5,000 watts
- ERP: 20,000 watts

Links
- Webcast: Listen Live

DWSL (96.7 FM), broadcasting as 96.7 K-Lite, is a radio station owned and operated by Beta Broadcasting System. The station's studio and transmitter are located at #8 Kessing St., New Asinan, Olongapo.
