= Mt. Camisong Forest Park and Events =

Park in Benguet, Philippines

- Interactive map of Mt. Camisong Forest Park and Events
- Location: Itogon, Benguet, Philippines
- Coordinates: 16°24′57.9″N 120°41′09.5″E
- Area: 10 hectares (25 acres)
- Opening: February 1, 2025
- Operator: Mt. Camisong Property Management Inc.

Mt. Camisong Forest Park and Events is an ecotourism park in Itogon, Benguet, Philippines.

== History ==
Mt. Camisong Property Management Inc. proposed the creation of an ecotourism park at a site in the Lower Agno Watershed Forest Reserve in Itogon, Benguet. The company obtained clearance from the relevant Protected Area Management Board. An environmental impact assessment process was conducted from October 2023 to June 2024. Construction was already ongoing by October 2024.

The Mt. Camisong Forest Park and Events had its soft opening on January 27, 2025. It opened to the public on February 1, 2025.

== Facilities ==
Mt. Camisong Forest Park and Events features various trails and viewing deck including a glass-floor skywalk which extends over the edge of a mountain and is elevated 19.81 meters (65.0 ft) above the ground. It also has gardens and an amphitheater, as well as dining areas and a cafe.

It also has events and function halls such as the Kanlungan Hall, an indoor structure with 40-60 people capacity.

It has a solar photovoltaic system with 363 solar panels and a total capacity of 201 kW. It also has an electric vehicle charging station.
