= Voice of America Jazz Hour =

Radio program formerly hosted by Willis Conover

The Voice of America Jazz Hour was broadcast on Voice of America beginning on January 6, 1955, and through 2003; the program was then folded into Voice of America Music Mix's (now VOA1) program Jazz America. It began broadcasting in 1955, hosted by Willis Conover; in its current form, it is hosted by Russ Davis. It began broadcasting in 1955 over the initial objections of Congress. The theme song of the program was "Take the A Train". At its height, the Voice of America Jazz Hour was listened to by up to 30 million people. Although the Voice of America was prohibited from broadcasting in the United States by the Smith-Mundt Act, the shortwave signal was receivable in the United States and had a sizable US audience.

== Contributions to the Cold War ==
As jazz was frequently banned in the Soviet Union and its satellite countries, Voice of America was often the only way people in those countries could listen to jazz. Willis Conover's politics-free broadcasts are widely credited for keeping interest in jazz active in Soviet satellite states. In addition, Conover's clear, measured pronunciation when hosting the Jazz Hour is sometimes credited for leading to the development of Special English in 1959.
