= Sacred Heart High School of Itogon =

Roman Catholic high school in Benguet, Philippines

Sacred Heart High School of Itogon, Inc.

Location
- 15 Poblacion, Itogon, Benguet; Philippines
- Coordinates: 16°21′37″N 120°40′43″E

Information
- Type: Private, Catholic school

Sacred Heart High School of Itogon, Inc. is a private Catholic school located at the municipality of Itogon in the Philippine province of Benguet.

== History ==
In 1950 Father Julien/Julian De Lodder started with a small humble school, a high school which is now the Sacred Heart High School of Itogon. It is the second Diocesan School founded after Immaculate Conception of Bokod.

The school was opened with 24 freshmen on June 3, 1950. On June 18, 1951 it accepted 37 students for first year and 23 students for the second year level. The operation stopped in 1952 because of the lack of levels but eventually returned to operation in 1955 with complete four levels.

In 1956, there were 21 students who graduated in this institution. In November 2002, the First Grand Alumni Homecoming was celebrated at SHHS on its 51st Anniversary.

The old school building was able to stand the 1990 Luzon earthquake but because of the structure is so old a new school building was needed. The construction of the new building at the school garden was started in June 2006 and was finished in December because of the help from parents. The new school building was inaugurated by the Diocesan Schools Superintendent Fr. Percy Bacani on December 12, 2006.

== Sources ==
- "The Origin and Development of the Itogon Mission" by Fr. Herman Flameygh
- The Official Publication of Sacred Heart High School-Itogon, Benguet (Vol. XIII No. 2 and Vol. XVII No.1, No.2)
