= List of metropolitan areas in the Philippines =

The Philippines has six metropolitan areas established either through national legislation or urban planning that have a designated governing body: Metro Baguio (MBLISTTDA), Metro Cebu (MCDCB), Metro Davao (MDDA), Metro Iloilo–Guimaras (MIGEDC), Metro Manila (MMDA), and Metro Naga (MNDC),

Among these six, three are officially recognized by the Department of Economy, Planning, and Development (DEPDev) as "metropolitan centers" due to their prominence, population, size, and economy: Metro Manila, Metro Cebu, and Metro Davao. These centers serve as the primary economic hubs for the country's three major island groups. Metro Manila is the national capital region and the center for government and finance in Luzon and the Philippines in general; Metro Cebu is the key hub for trade and commerce in the Visayas; and Metro Davao is the major gateway and service center for Mindanao. Of the three, Metro Manila is the most populous, while Metro Davao is the largest in terms of land area, regardless of its definition. (Note: See Metro Davao#Definitions of Metro Davao.)

Six other metropolitan areas have also been identified in various planning frameworks: Metro Batangas, Metro Bacolod, Metro Cagayan de Oro, Metro Clark, Metro Dagupan, and Metro Olongapo. All six were identified as metropolitan areas in earlier planning frameworks of the National Economic and Development Authority (NEDA), DEPDev's predecessor. Although they were no longer included as metropolitan areas in the 2017–2022 Philippine Development Plan, they continued to be recognized as metropolitan areas in other planning frameworks and by other sectors.

Despite these official definitions, the actual extent of continuous urbanization often exceeds administrative boundaries. The built-up area of Metro Manila, for instance, has long extended into the neighboring provinces of Bulacan, Cavite, Laguna, and Rizal.

== List ==
=== Metropolitan centers ===
- Metro Manila
- Metro Cebu
- Metro Davao

=== Regional centers ===
1. Antipolo
2. Bacolod
3. Baguio
4. Balanga
5. Baliwag
6. Batangas City
7. Butuan
8. Cabanatuan
9. Calamba
10. Calapan
11. Clark
12. Cotabato City
13. Dagupan
14. Dasmariñas
15. Dipolog
16. Eastern Kalinga (Tabuk–Pinukpuk–Rizal)
17. General Santos
18. Iloilo
19. Jolo
20. Koronadal
21. Laoag
22. Legazpi
23. Lucena
24. Malolos
25. Naga (Camarines Sur)
26. Ormoc
27. Pagadian
28. Puerto Princesa
29. San Fernando (La Union)
30. Santiago
31. Subic–Olongapo
32. Surigao City
33. Tacloban
34. Tagbilaran
35. Tagum
36. Tarlac City
37. Tuguegarao
38. Zamboanga City

=== Sub-regional centers ===
1. Alaminos
2. Alfonso Lista
3. Arayat
4. Aurora
5. Bacoor
6. Banaue
7. Bangued
8. Baras
9. Bauko
10. Bayog
11. Besao
12. Binangonan
13. Bislig
14. Biñan
15. Boac
16. Bogo
17. Bongao
18. Bontoc
19. Buug
20. Cabuyao
21. Cainta
22. Calbayog
23. Capas
24. Catbalogan
25. Cauayan
26. Concepcion
27. Daet
28. Danglas
29. Digos
30. Dumaguete
31. Dumalinao
32. Dumangas
33. Dumingag
34. Estancia
35. Flora
36. General Mariano Alvarez
37. General Trias
38. Gingoog
39. Glan
40. Hagonoy
41. Ilagan
42. Iligan
43. Imus
44. Ipil
45. Iriga
46. Isabela–Lamitan
47. Jordan
48. Kabankalan
49. Kabasalan
50. Kalibo
51. Kiangan
52. Kidapawan
53. La Paz
54. Laguindingan
55. Lamut
56. Langiden
57. Ligao
58. Lipa
59. Lubao
60. Luna
61. Mabalacat
62. Mahayag
63. Malay
64. Malaybalay
65. Malita
66. Maramag
67. Marawi
68. Margosatubig
69. Marilao
70. Mariveles
71. Masbate City
72. Mati
73. Matnog
74. Mexico
75. Meycauayan
76. Miagao
77. Midsayap
78. Molave
79. Nasugbu
80. Ozamiz
81. Panabo
82. Parang
83. Passi
84. Peñarrubia
85. Pidigan
86. Pili
87. Polomolok
88. Pudtol
89. Rodriguez
90. Romblon
91. Roxas
92. Sadanga
93. San Carlos (Negros Occidental)
94. San Fernando (Pampanga)
95. San Francisco
96. San Ildefonso
97. San Isidro
98. San Jose (Occidental Mindoro)
99. San Jose (Nueva Ecija)
100. San Jose de Buenavista
101. San Jose del Monte
102. San Mateo
103. San Miguel
104. San Pablo
105. San Pedro
106. Santa Ana
107. Santa Marcela
108. Santa Maria
109. Santa Rosa
110. Santo Tomas
111. Sariaya
112. Silang
113. Sindangan
114. Sorsogon City
115. Tabaco
116. Tacurong
117. Tanauan
118. Tandag
119. Tanza
120. Taytay
121. Tayum
122. Toledo
123. Trece Martires
124. Tubigon
125. Tubo
126. Tubod
127. Urdaneta
128. Valencia
129. Vigan
130. Virac

== History ==
In 2020, 54% of the Philippine population lived in urban areas encompassing many cities. Growth in some cities has led to urban spillover in adjacent municipalities.

Metro Manila was created in 1975 with the establishment of the Metro Manila Commission. This commission, reorganized in 1986 as the Metro Manila Authority, was renamed in 1995 as the Metropolitan Manila Development Authority (MMDA). While MMDA has no power over the local government units (LGUs) it covers, it has worked with the LGUs to solve issues that affect all of them such as traffic management.

The practice of creating an intercity board or agency to determine the limits of a metropolitan area has become common. A number of proposals have been created to create similar metropolitan arrangements in other areas of the country. In 1997, Cebu created the Metropolitan Cebu Development Council (MCDC), which was renamed the Metropolitan Cebu Development and Coordinating Board (MCDCB) in 2011. In 2022, Baguio and Davao created their own metropolitan boards. Other proposed metropolitan boards include ones for Bulacan and Bataan.

== List of built-up urban areas ==
The following table lists urban areas in the Philippines, with a population of over 500,000, according to Demographia's "World Urban Areas" study as of 2023. Demographia defines an urban area as a continuously built up land mass of urban development that is within a labor and housing market, without regard for administrative boundaries.

Rank	Urban Area	Est. Population	Built-up Area (sq miles)	Built-up Area (sq km)	Pop. Density (per sq miles)	Pop. Density (per sq km)
1	Manila	24,156,000	738	1,911	32,732	12,638
2	Cebu City	2,482,000	79	205	31,418	12,130
3	Davao City	1,379,000	50	130	27,580	10,649
4	Cagayan de Oro	723,000	27	70	26,778	10,339
5	Angeles City	712,000	72	186	9,889	3,818
6	Bacolod	611,000	32	83	19,094	7,372
7	Iloilo City	542,000	35	91	15,486	5,979
8	Zamboanga City	539,000	21	54	25,667	9,910
9	General Santos	529,000	36	93	14,694	5,674

== Gallery ==
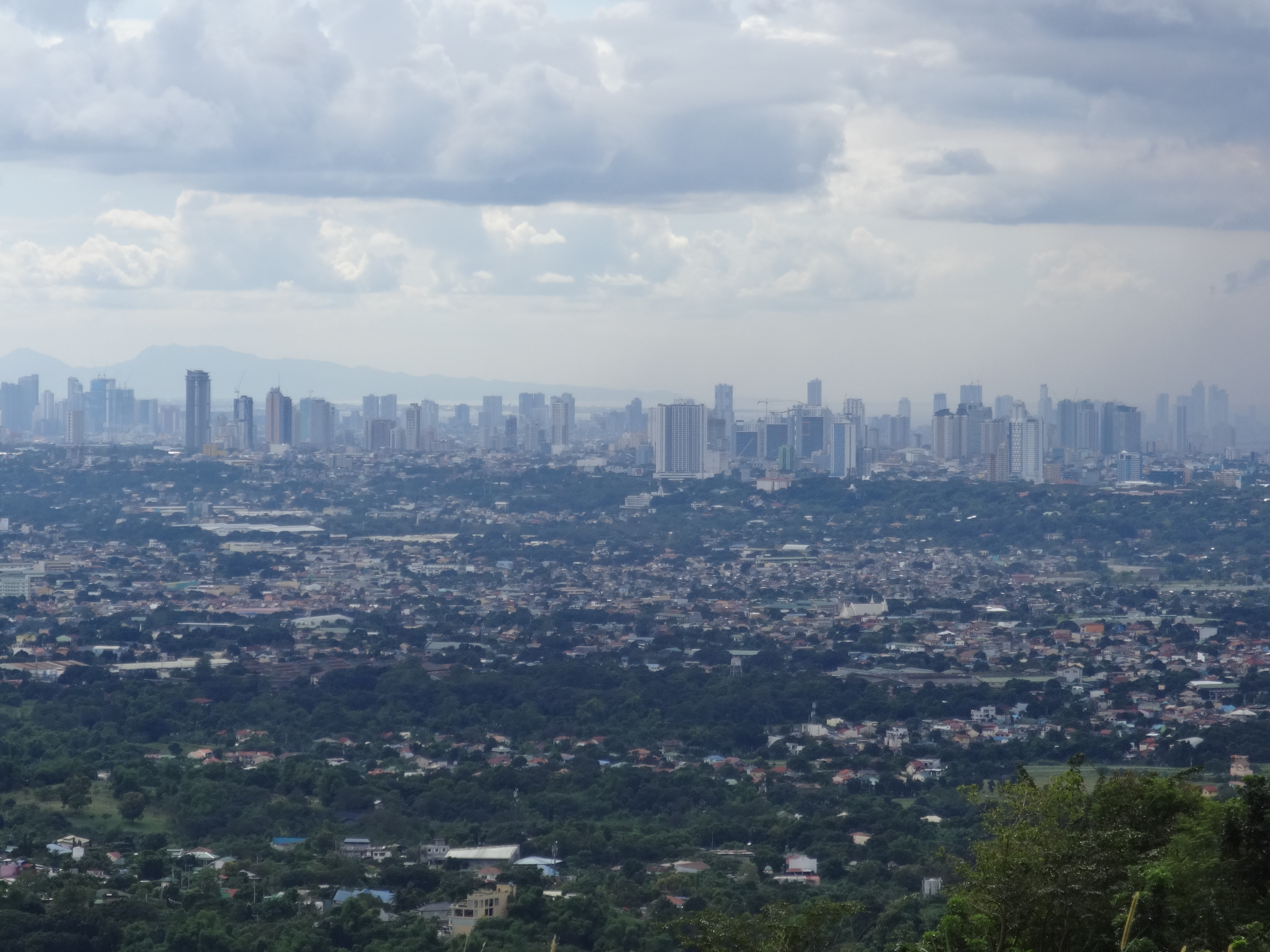
Metro Manila

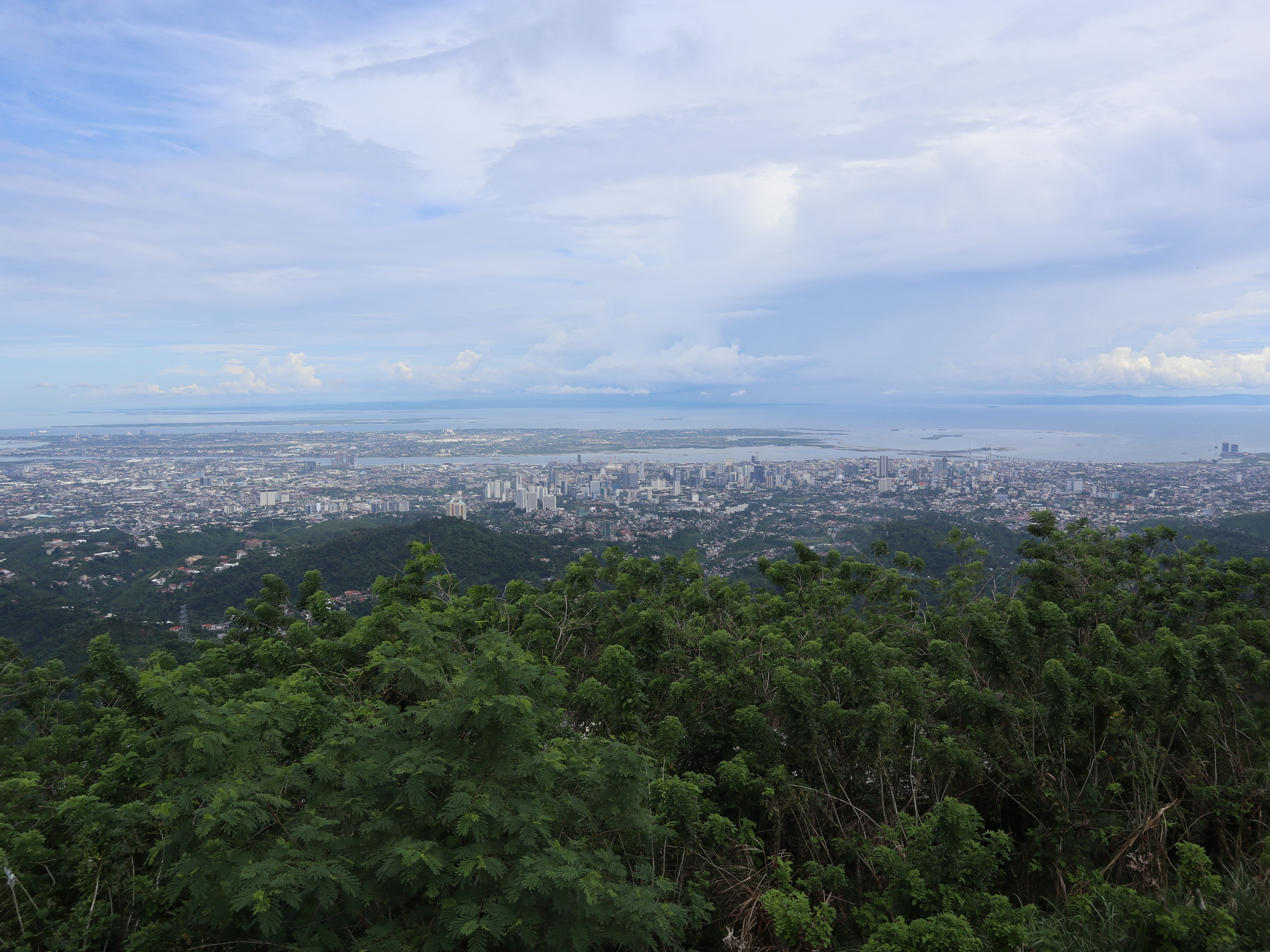
Metro Cebu

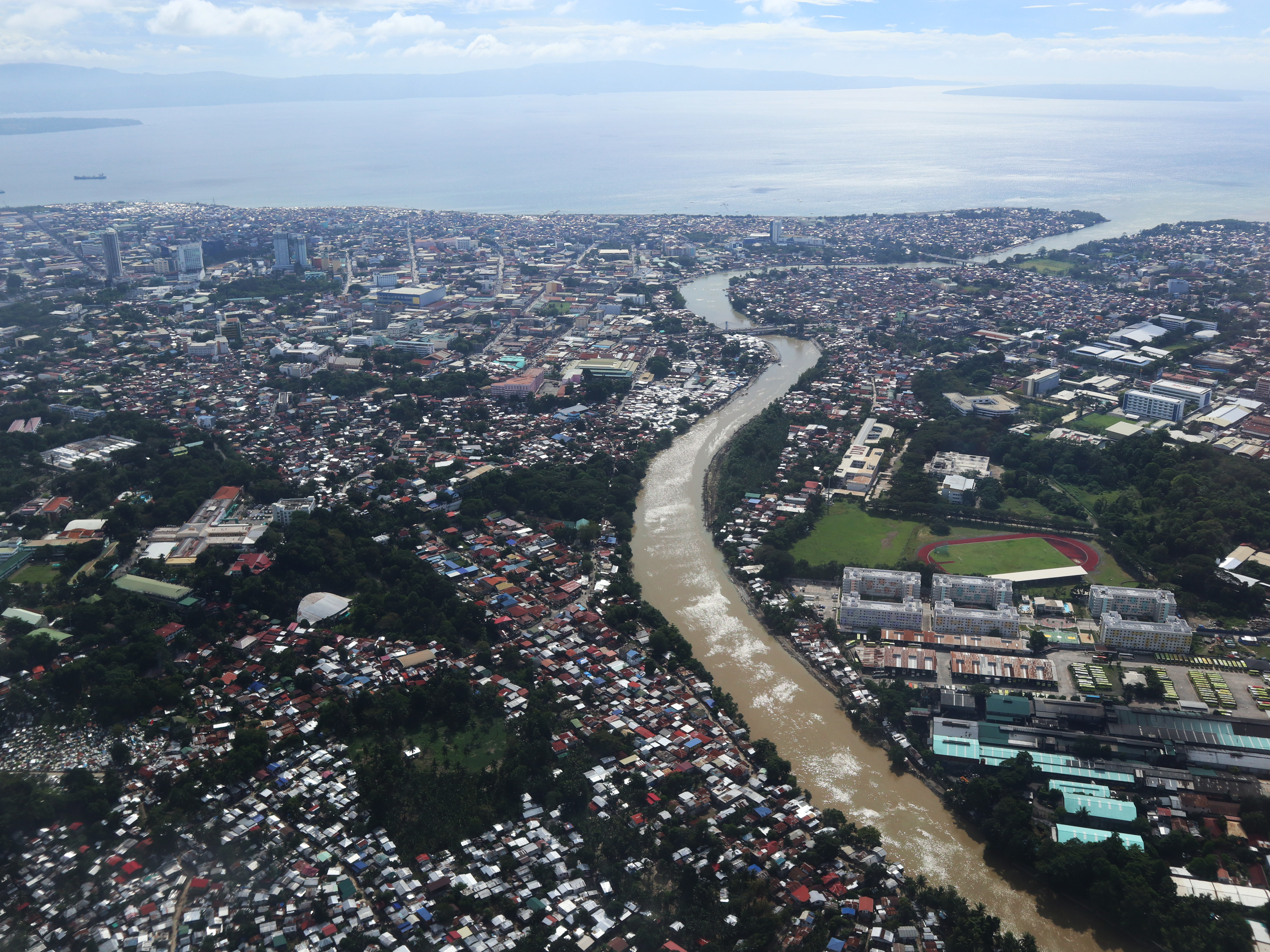
Metro Davao

== See also ==
- List of cities in the Philippines
- List of metropolitan areas in Asia
- List of urban agglomerations in Asia
