= DWSK =

Radio station in Baguio, Philippines

K-Lite Baguio (DWSK)
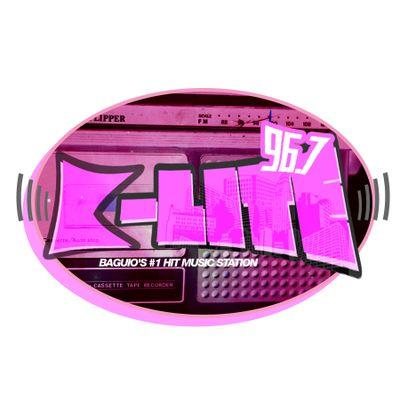

Baguio; Philippines
- Broadcast area: Benguet, La Union and surrounding areas
- Frequency: 96.7 MHz
- Branding: 96.7 K-Lite

Programming
- Language: English
- Format: Adult Top 40
- Network: K-Lite
- Affiliations: Voice of America (VOA1 block)

Ownership
- Owner: Beta Broadcasting System

History
- First air date: 1991

Technical information
- Licensing authority: NTC
- Power: 5,000 watts
- ERP: 20 kW

Links
- Webcast: Listen Live
- Website: klite967.com

DWSK (96.7 FM), broadcasting as 96.7 K-Lite, is a radio station owned and operated by Beta Broadcasting System. The station's studio and transmitter are located at #3 Upper Market, Camp Allen, Baguio.
