= Loakan Airport =

Airport in Baguio City, Philippines

Loakan Airport Pantayaban ni Loakan Pagtayaban ti Loakan Paliparan ng Loakan Aeropuerto de Loakan
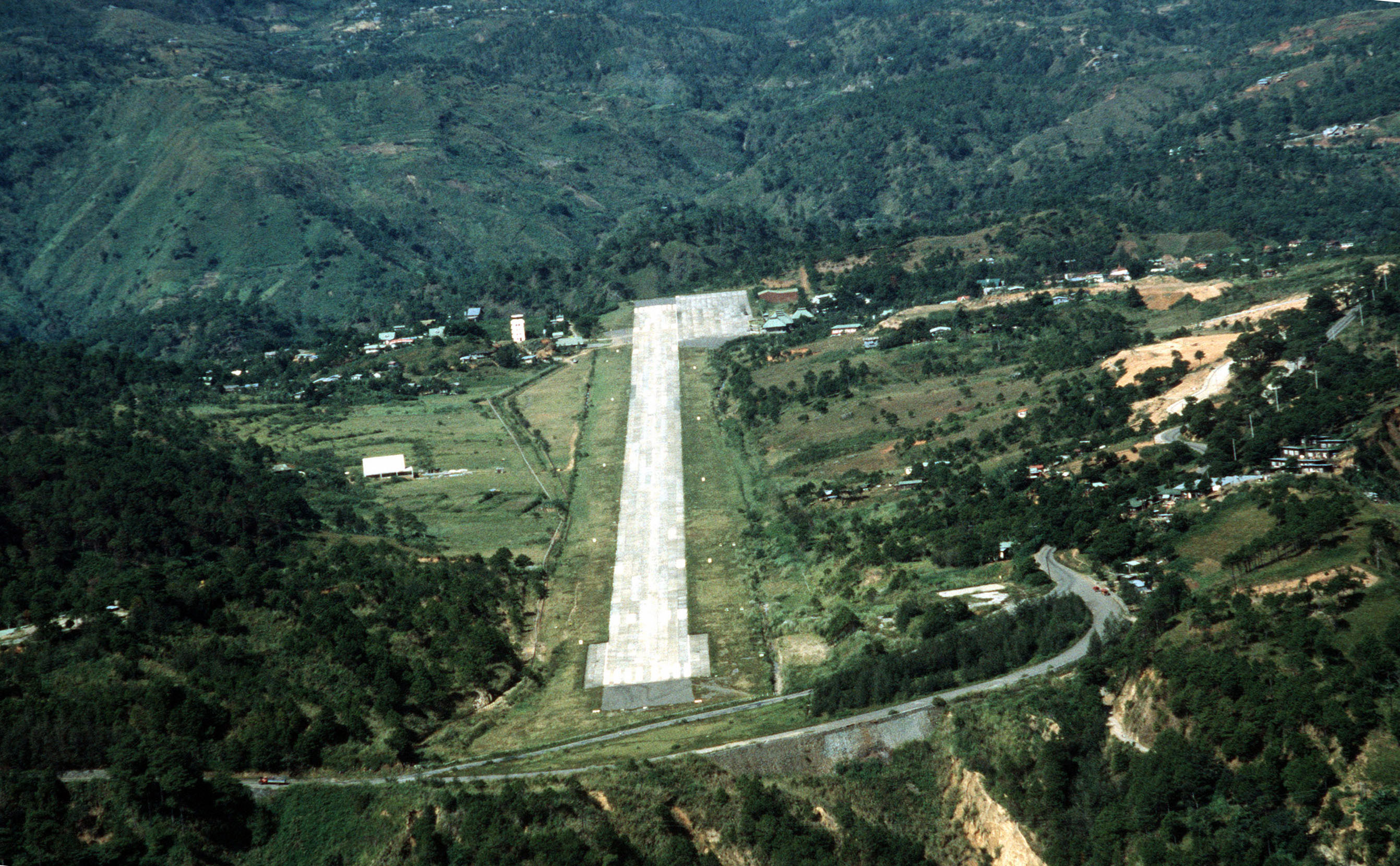
- The airport in 1983.
- IATA: BAG; ICAO: RPUB

Summary
- Airport type: Public
- Owner/Operator: Civil Aviation Authority of the Philippines
- Serves: Metro Baguio
- Location: Loakan Proper, Baguio, Benguet, Philippines
- Opened: 1934; 92 years ago
- Elevation AMSL: 1,296 m (4,252 ft)
- Coordinates: 16°22′30″N 120°37′10″E

Map
- Location within Luzon Location within Philippines

Runways
Direction	Length		Surface
Direction	m	ft	Surface
09/27	1,802	5,912	Concrete

Statistics (2021)
- Passengers: 1,532
- Aircraft movements: 386
- Cargo (in kg): 0
- Statistics from the Civil Aviation Authority of the Philippines.

Loakan Airport (IATA: BAG, ICAO: RPUB) serves the general area of Baguio, Philippines. It is classified as a Class 2 principal (minor domestic) airport by the Civil Aviation Authority of the Philippines (CAAP). Loakan Airport, the city's only airport, was built in 1934. Its short runway, frequent low visibility, and deep ravines at both ends of the runway continue to challenge pilots greatly, especially when it comes to landing.

== History ==
=== Construction and World War II ===
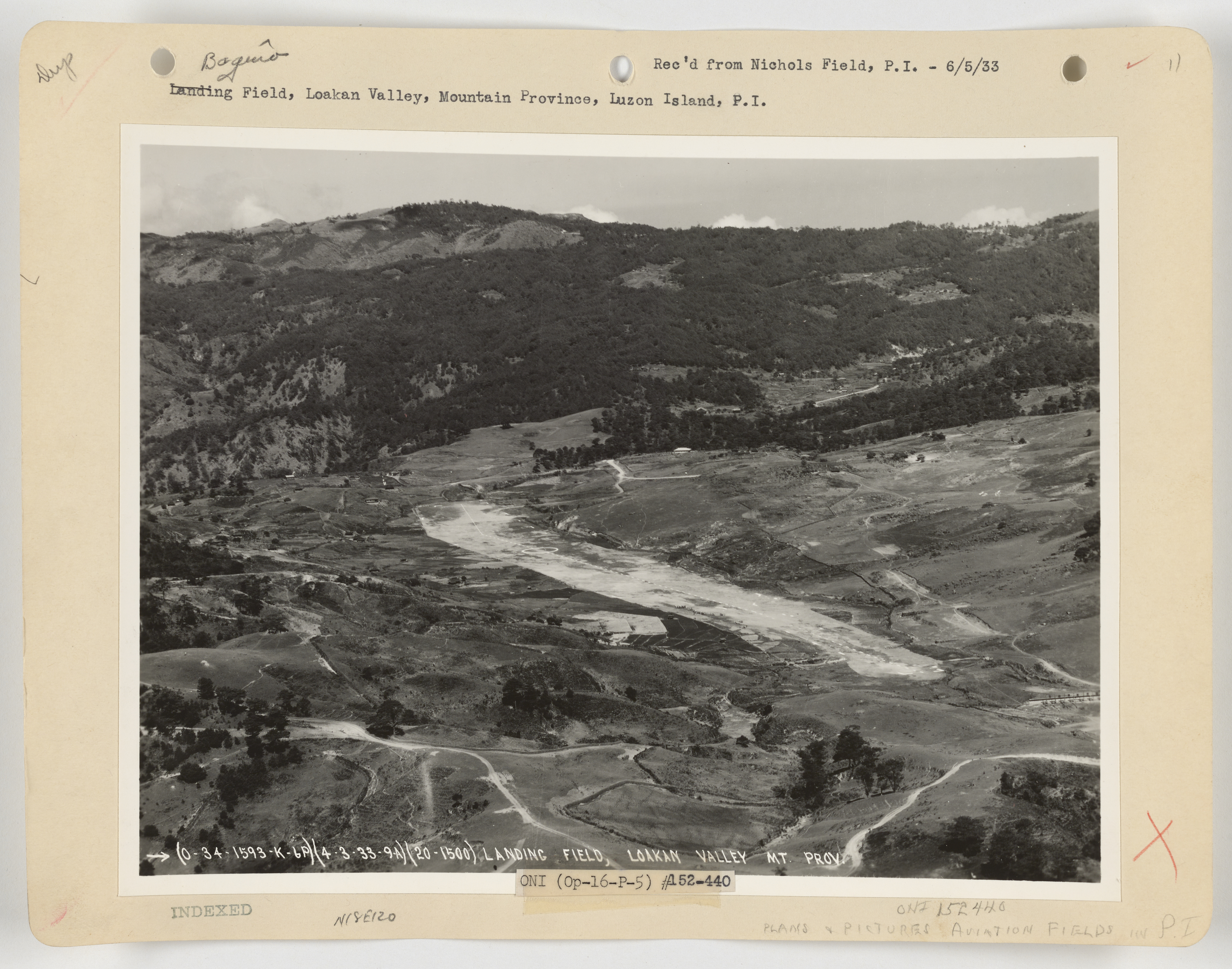
Aerial view of landing field at Loakan Valley, circa 1930s

The airport was built in 1934 by the American colonial government. On March 15, 1941, the first flight of Philippine Airlines performed by a Beechcraft Model 18 from Manila's Nielson Field landed at the airport. In December 1941, during the Japanese occupation of the Philippines, the airfield was occupied by the 9th Regiment of the Imperial Japanese Army. The area was recaptured by the United States Army in April 1945.

=== Post-war and eventual closure ===
Commercial flights soon commenced to the airport. However, due to the elevation of the airport and navigational difficulties in an event of low visibilities, the airport was dropped from the flight routes of many airlines. Airlines reduced the number of flights to the airport after the 1990 Luzon earthquake. Despite the successful trial flight of a Philippine Airlines Boeing 737-300 to the airport from Manila's Ninoy Aquino International Airport on February 5, 1996, regular jet services from the airline never materialized.

During the presidency of Gloria Macapagal Arroyo, the airport was planned to be closed and converted into an extension of the Baguio City Economic Zone in 2008. That however was discouraged by the officials of the Baguio city government.

During its closure to commercial flights, the airport was used by military and private aircraft.

=== Reopening ===
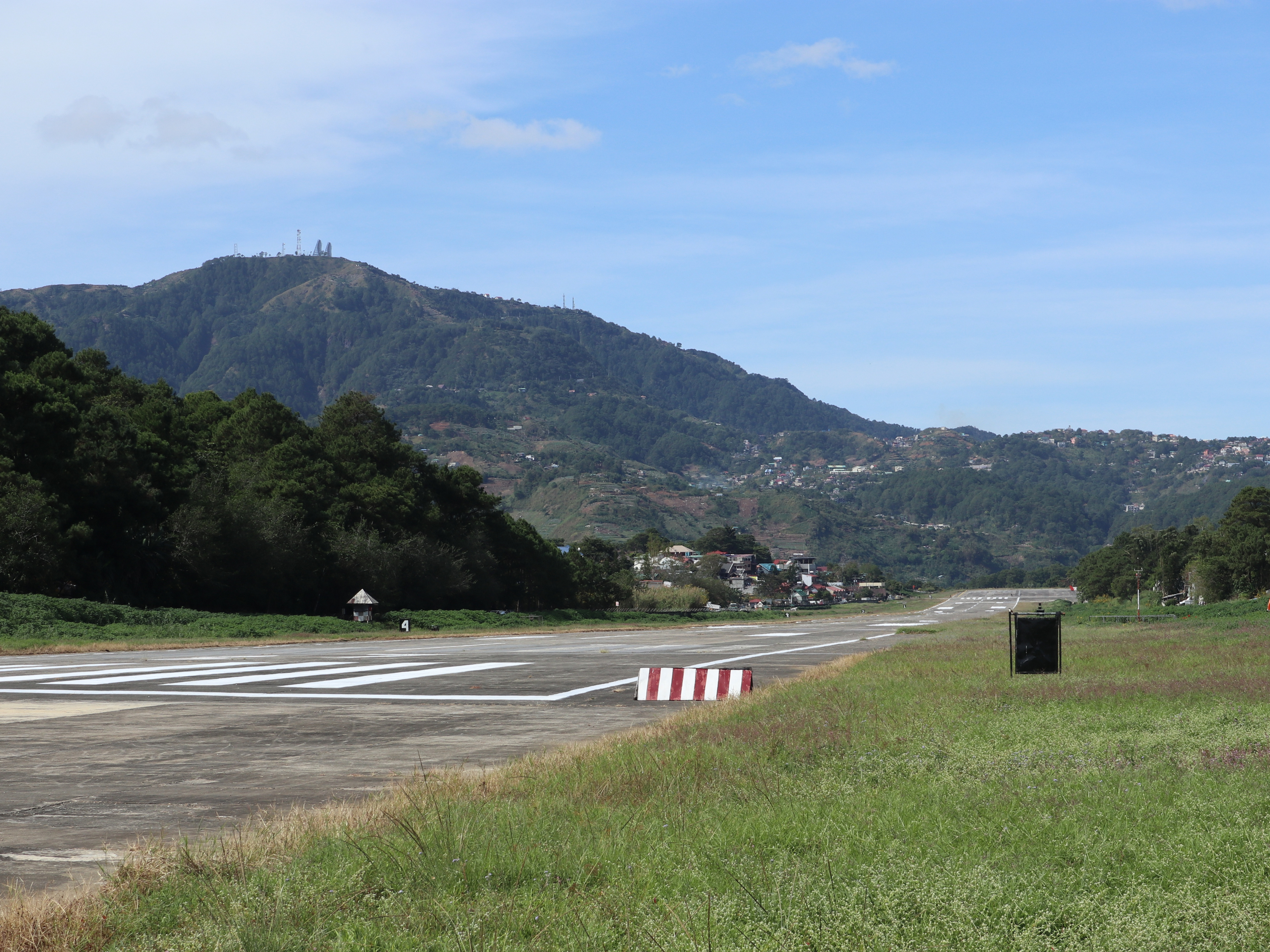
The airport runway in December 2022.

Plans to revive the airport have been announced by numerous entities over the years. There were attempts to reopen the airport for commercial flights in 2012 and 2015.

In January 2020, the city government of Baguio announced that they were considering a deal from San Miguel Corporation to open and operate the airport in the second quarter of 2020. It had already started moves to ensure that the airport is ready for commercial operations by resolving the issues seen by the CAAP such as the encroachment of residents and obstructions on the runway but have received protests from residents who have legitimate land titles in the area.

Although the city government announced the following year that the airport is now ready to receive commercial flights after it has completed the initial steps outlined by the CAAP to address the safety issues for commercial aircraft, a more targeted opening date was not announced until 2022, with the city government announcing that it aims to reopen the airport in November 2022, in time for the Christmas season. It also announced that it will spend around ₱68 million to rehabilitate the airport terminal.

Loakan Airport reopened on December 16, 2022, with Philippine Airlines (operated by PAL Express) launching the first regular commercial flight to the airport in decades to and from Mactan–Cebu International Airport on the day of the reopening. However, commercial flights between Baguio and Cebu, were discontinued on July 1, 2024, due to insufficient passenger demand.

== Incidents and accidents ==
- On March 30, 1952, a Philippine Airlines DC-3 crashed shortly after takeoff, killing 10 of the 29 occupants on board..
- On the morning of June 27, 1987, Philippine Airlines Flight 206, a Hawker Siddeley HS 748 from Manila, crashed into the slopes of Mt. Ugo while attempting to land in a monsoon, killing all 50 people on board. A Philippine Air Force Bell UH-1 Huey was lost during recovery operations of that crash.
- On May 25, 2005, a Philippine Air Force Cessna T-41 crashed right after takeoff. All four airmen died.
- On April 7, 2009, a Bell 412 presidential helicopter owned by the Philippine Air Force carrying eight key aides of President Gloria Macapagal Arroyo crashed into the slopes of Mount Pulag in Tinoc, Ifugao while en route to Lagawe, the provincial capital of Ifugao, after attempting to return to Loakan Airport due to bad weather. Mount Pulag is over 50 kilometers (31 mi) away from Loakan Airport. All on board died and Malacañang mourned their deaths. The key aides were checking the area for a planned visit by President Arroyo to inspect a mountain road project. Because of the disaster, she cancelled her trip. U.S. officials dispatched CH-46 Sea Knights to find the downed aircraft.

== See also ==
- List of airports in the Philippines
