= Willis Conover =

American radio producer (1920–1996)

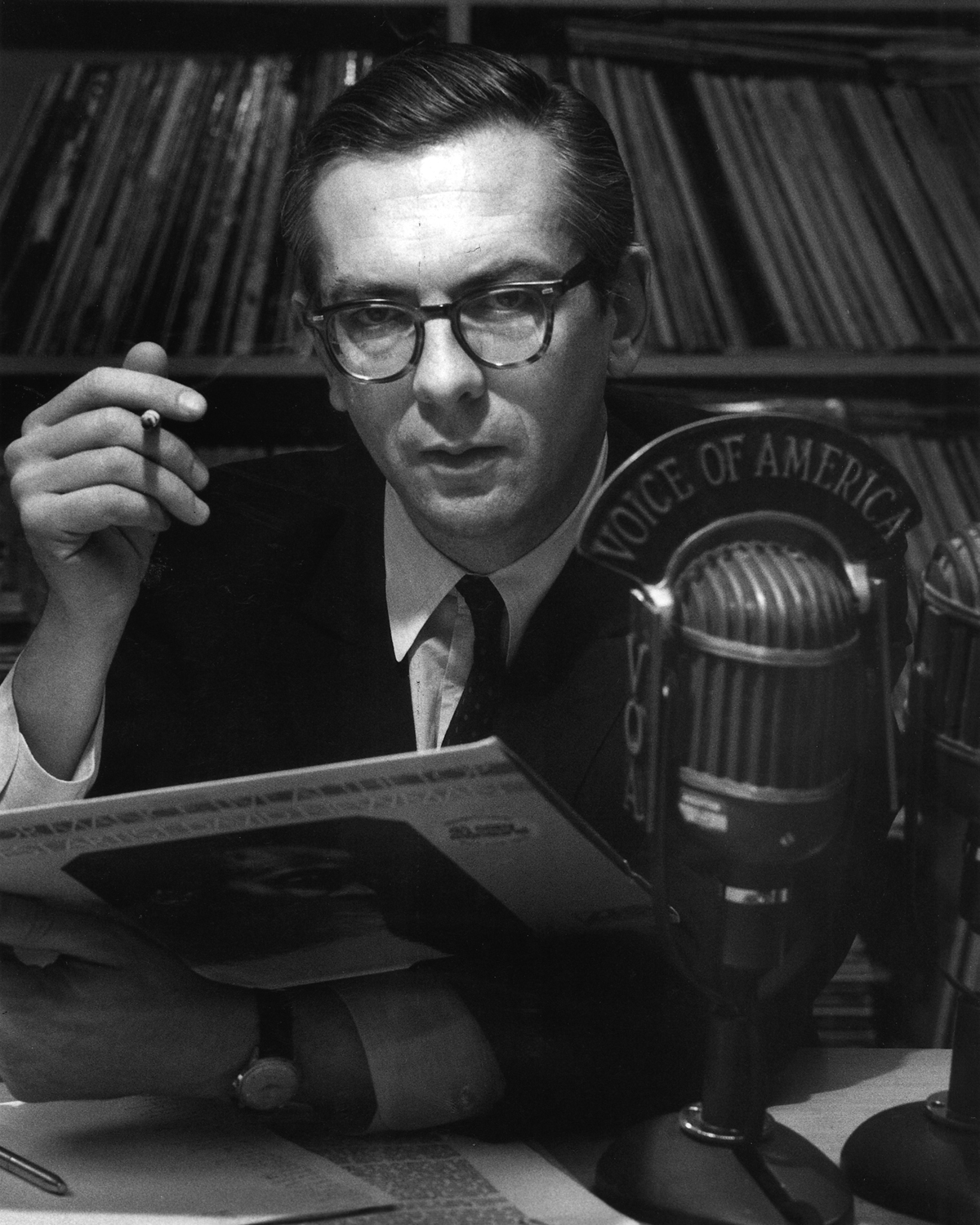
- Conover broadcasting with Voice of America in 1969

Background information
- Born: December 18, 1920; Buffalo, New York, U.S.
- Died: May 17, 1996 (aged 75) Alexandria, Virginia, U.S.
- Education: Maryland State Teacher's College
- Occupations: Broadcaster and producer

Willis Clark Conover Jr. (December 18, 1920 – May 17, 1996) was an American jazz producer and broadcaster on the Voice of America for more than forty years. He produced jazz concerts at the White House, the Newport Jazz Festival, and for movies and television. By arranging concerts where people of all races were welcome, he is credited with desegregating Washington, D.C. nightclubs. Conover is credited with keeping interest in jazz alive in the countries of Eastern Europe through his nightly broadcasts during the Cold War.

== Youth ==
As a young man, Conover was interested in science fiction, and published a science-fiction fanzine, Science Fantasy Correspondent. This brought him into contact with horror writer H. P. Lovecraft. The correspondence between Lovecraft, who was at the end of his life, and the young Conover has been published as Lovecraft at Last.

Conover's father had intended for him to attend The Citadel senior military college and follow his family's history of military service. Instead, Conover attended the Maryland State Teacher's College at Salisbury, Maryland, and became a radio announcer for WTBO in Cumberland, Maryland.

He later moved to Washington, D.C., and focused on jazz in his programming, especially the Duke Ellington hour on Saturday nights. Conover's guests on this program and Saturday morning shows included many artists, such as Boyd Raeburn.

== Voice of America ==
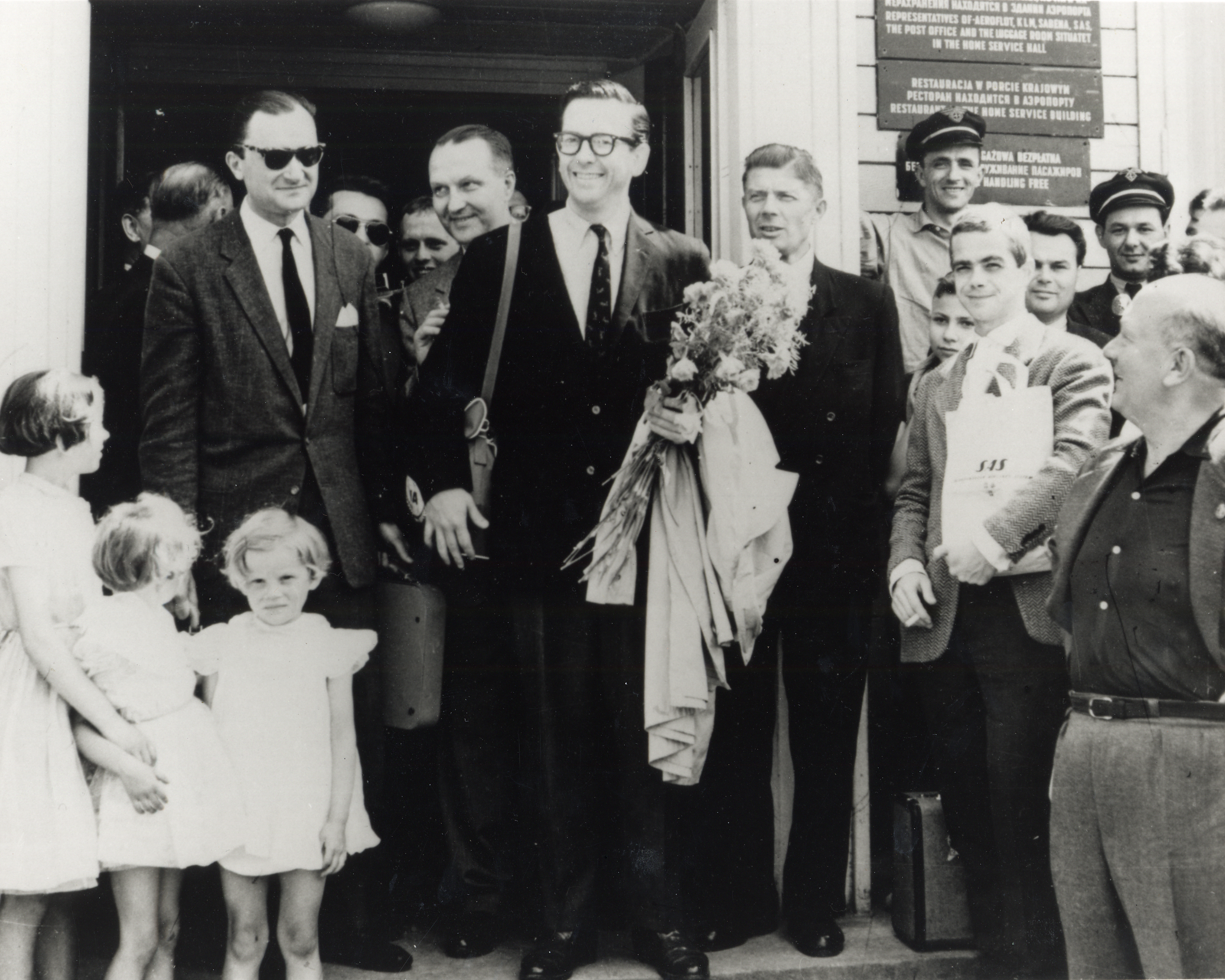
Conover's first arrival in Poland (1959)

Conover came to work at the Voice of America, and became known to jazz lovers via the hour-long program Voice of America Jazz Hour. His slow delivery and the use of scripts written in Special English made his programs more widely accessible and he is said to have become the first teacher of English to a whole generation of East European jazz lovers. Conover was not well known in the United States, even among jazz aficionados, as the Voice of America did not broadcast domestically except on shortwave, but his visits to Eastern Europe and the Soviet Union brought huge crowds and star treatment for him. He was a celebrity figure in the Soviet Union, where the Voice of America was a prime source of information as well as music.

In 1956, Conover conducted a series of interviews with jazz musicians such as Duke Ellington, Billie Holiday, Stan Getz, Peggy Lee, Stan Kenton, Benny Goodman, and Art Tatum. His interview with Tatum is reputedly "the only known in-depth recorded interview with the pianist". These interviews were selected by the Library of Congress as a 2010 addition to the National Recording Registry, which selects recordings annually that are "culturally, historically, or aesthetically significant".

== Death ==
Conover died of lung cancer on May 17, 1996, at the age of 75. He had been a smoker for 57 years. He was buried in Arlington National Cemetery.

In 2001, on the fifth anniversary of his death, US Embassy in Moscow and Moscow jazz society co-organized a commemorative concert in Moscow.

== Legacy ==
External videos
- Interview with Conover about the appeal of jazz music to international audiences, October 23, 1985, C-SPAN

Conover's broadcasts influenced a wave of Russian and Polish jazz musicians, among them Leo Feigin and Adam Makowicz.

In 1990, Conover was awarded an Honorary Doctorate of Music from Berklee College of Music.

In 2015, the University of North Texas announced that its Willis Conover Collection would make digitized copies of Conover's programs available online.
