= DWMB =

Radio station in Baguio, Philippines

Love Radio Baguio (DWMB)
- Baguio; Philippines
- Broadcast area: Benguet, La Union and surrounding areas
- Frequency: 95.1 MHz
- Branding: 95.1 Love Radio

Programming
- Languages: Ilocano, Filipino
- Format: Contemporary MOR, OPM
- Network: Love Radio

Ownership
- Owner: MBC Media Group
- Sister stations: 91.9 Easy Rock

History
- First air date: August 8, 1992
- Call sign meaning: Manila Broadcasting

Technical information
- Licensing authority: NTC
- Power: 10,000 watts
- ERP: 15,000 watts

Links
- Webcast: Listen Live
- Website: Love Radio Baguio

DWMB (95.1 FM), broadcasting as 95.1 Love Radio, is a radio station owned and operated by MBC Media Group. Its studios and transmitter are located at Skyrise Hotel, Dominican Rd., Baguio.
