= Baguio–Bua–Itogon National Road =

Road in Luzon, Philippines

- Baguio–Bua–Itogon Road; Baguio–Bua–Itogon–Dalupirip National Road

Route information
- Length: 20.2 km (12.6 mi)

Major junctions
- East end: Dalupirip Village in Itogon
- West end: N110 (Leonard Wood Road) in Baguio

Location
- Country: Philippines
- Major cities: Baguio
- Towns: Itogon

Highway system
- Roads in the Philippines; Highways; Expressways; List

The Baguio–Bua–Itogon National Road (alternatively the Baguio–Bua–Itogon–Dalupirip National Road, or simply Baguio-Bua-Itogon Road) is a major highway in northern Luzon that runs from the city of Baguio to the municipality of Itogon in the province of Benguet.

It serves as an important route for accessing the mining town of Itogon, particularly six of its barangays (Tuding, Gumatdang, Ucab, Poblacion (Central), Tinongdan, and Dalupirip).

The highway's west terminus begins from a junction with Leonard Wood Road. Its east end lies in the mid-area of the large southern barangay of Dalupirip, just beside the Agno River.

Within the Philippine highway network, the entire highway is designated as an unnumbered national tertiary road.

== See also ==
- Highways in the Philippines
