= Beta Broadcasting System =

Philippine radio network

Beta Broadcasting System, Inc.
- Type: Private
- Industry: Radio network
- Founded: 1968
- Founder: Felipe Llanora
- Headquarters: Baguio and Olongapo, Philippines
- Key people: Leticia Llanora-dela Cruz; President & CEO
- Website: klite967.com

Beta Broadcasting System, Inc. is a Philippine radio network. Its corporate office is located at #8 Elane St., Brgy. New Asinan, Olongapo and at 003 Upper Market, Camp Allen, Baguio. BBSI operates a number of stations across Northern Luzon.

== BBSI stations ==
=== AM stations ===
Branding	Callsign	Frequency	Power	Location	Owned since
Apo Radyo	DWHL	756 kHz	5 kW	Olongapo	1968

=== FM stations ===
Branding	Callsign	Frequency	Power	Location	Owned since
K-Lite Baguio	DWSK	96.7 MHz	10 kW	Baguio	1991
K-Lite Olongapo	DWSL	96.7 MHz	5 kW	Olongapo	1978
