= DZYS =

Radio station in Baguio, Philippines

Easy Rock Baguio (DZYS)
- Baguio; Philippines
- Broadcast area: Benguet, La Union and surrounding areas
- Frequency: 91.9 MHz
- Branding: 91.9 Easy Rock

Programming
- Language: English
- Format: Soft Adult Contemporary
- Network: Easy Rock

Ownership
- Owner: MBC Media Group; (Cebu Broadcasting Company)
- Sister stations: 95.1 Love Radio

History
- First air date: 1995
- Former call signs: DZST (1995–2016)
- Former names: Showbiz Tsismis (1995-2000); Yes FM (2000-2009)
- Call sign meaning: Yes FM (former branding)

Technical information
- Licensing authority: NTC
- Power: 5,000 watts

Links
- Webcast: Listen Live
- Website: Easy Rock Baguio

DZYS (91.9 FM), broadcasting as 91.9 Easy Rock, is a radio station owned and operated by MBC Media Group through its licensee Cebu Broadcasting Company. Its studios and transmitter are located inside the Skyrise Hotel, Dominican Rd., Baguio.

It was formerly known as a relay station of Manila-based Showbiz Tsismis from 1995 to 2000 and Yes! FM from 2000 to 2009, when it was relaunched under the Easy Rock network. It airs a simulcast of DZRH from 4:00 AM – 7:30 AM.
