= Benguet Corporation =

Philippine mining company

- Founded: 1903
- Founders: Nelsen Peterson; Harry C. Clyde; M. M. Clarke
- Headquarters: 7th Floor, Universal Re Building, 106 Paseo de Roxas, Makati Central Business District, Makati City
- Area served: Philippines
- Key people: Daniel Andrew Romualdez (Chairman); Benjamin Philip Romualdez, Jr. (CEO)
- Website: benguetcorp.com

Benguet Corporation is a diversified Philippine business enterprise. Founded in 1903 as the Benguet Consolidated Mining Company by three American G.I.s following the Philippine-American War, it is the oldest mining company in the country. The company operates gold mines in Benguet province and Jose Panganiban, Camarines Norte; chromite mines in Masinloc, Zambales; and copper mines in San Marcelino, Zambales.

== Activities ==
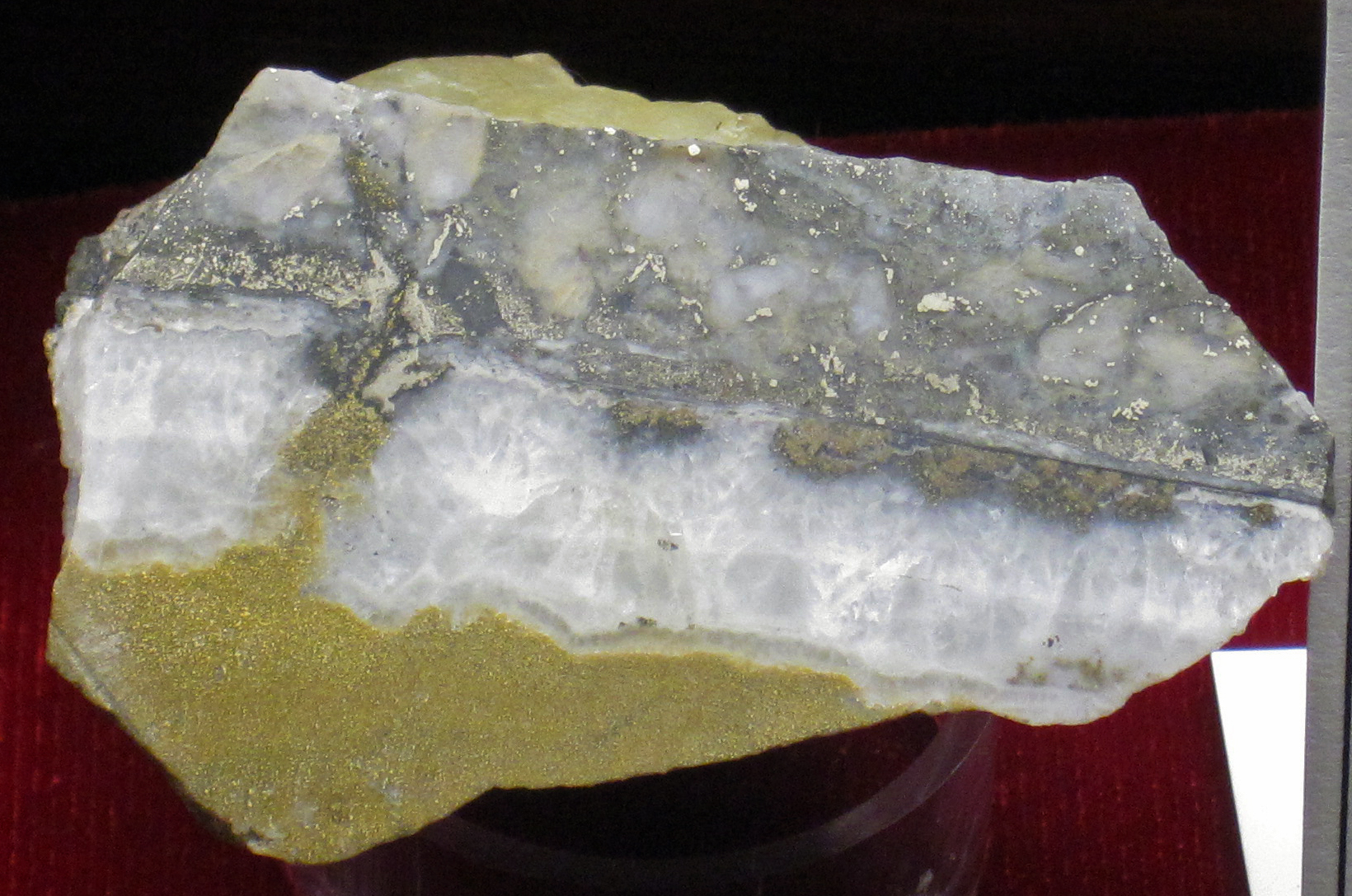
Old Gold & quartz specimen from a Benguet Corp. Mine

The company is mainly active in the mining industry, yet has come to incorporate other activities including forestry/reforestation, chemical testing and research, ecotourism, trucking and warehousing, heavy equipment leasing, trading and real estate.

In 2024, BC ended its 30-year debt restructuring contract clearing its real estate from mortgage adverse claims since 1933. It signed a joint rescission with its creditors, Wilshire Business Consulting Corp. and Armstrong Capital Holdings Corp., with trustee Philippine Veterans Bank. From March 31, 2025, the DENR granted BC a 25-year renewal, as operator for its Mineral Production Sharing Agreement (MPSA) No. 154-2000-III held by Balanga Bataan Minerals Corporation. The March 1996 operating contract covers 1,410 hectares in Bagac, Mariveles and Limay in Bataan province.

== Incidents ==
In August 2016, the Benguet Corporation was facing a $500,000 fine for tailings leak from its old Antamok mine in Itogon, which resulted in the pollution of the Agno, Liang, and Ambalanga rivers. In September 2018, the trial against Benguet was still going on, the defense arguing that leaks were a result of natural causes and thus Benguet should not be held accountable for the heavy water pollution of the area.

In 2017, Benguet was also called for by the local media for being responsible of the polluting leaks affecting the Dizon mine. The company denied all implications, arguing it was only active at the mine from 1975 to 1995.

In September 2018, the Benguet Corporation also faced claims that it was encouraging small-scale and illegal mining operations at the Itogon mine, officially inactive since 1990. The Itogon mine had just been hit a major landslide that caused 10 deaths and 50-60 missing persons. The Benguet Corporation denied encouraging the presence of the illegal gold diggers.
