= Itogon =

Municipality in Benguet, Philippines

- Municipality
- Municipality of Itogon
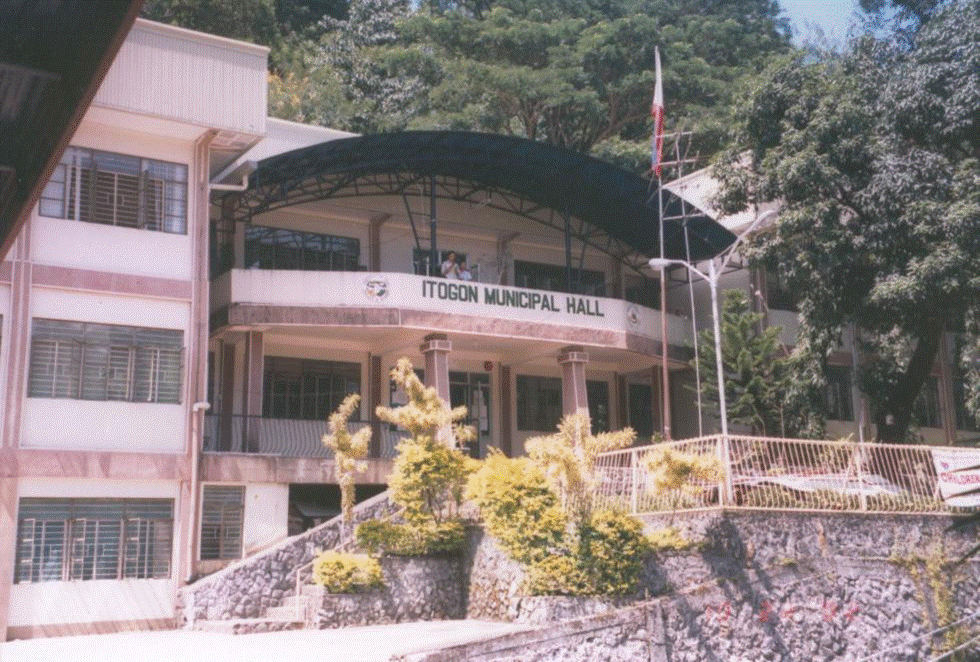
- Itogon Municipal Hall Antamok Open Pit Our Lady of Fatima Parish Church

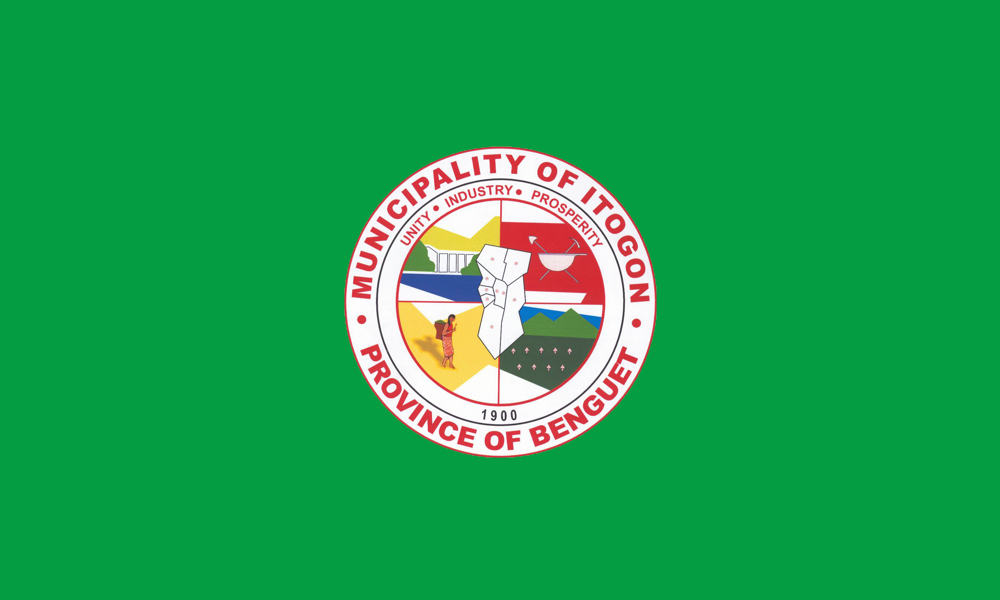
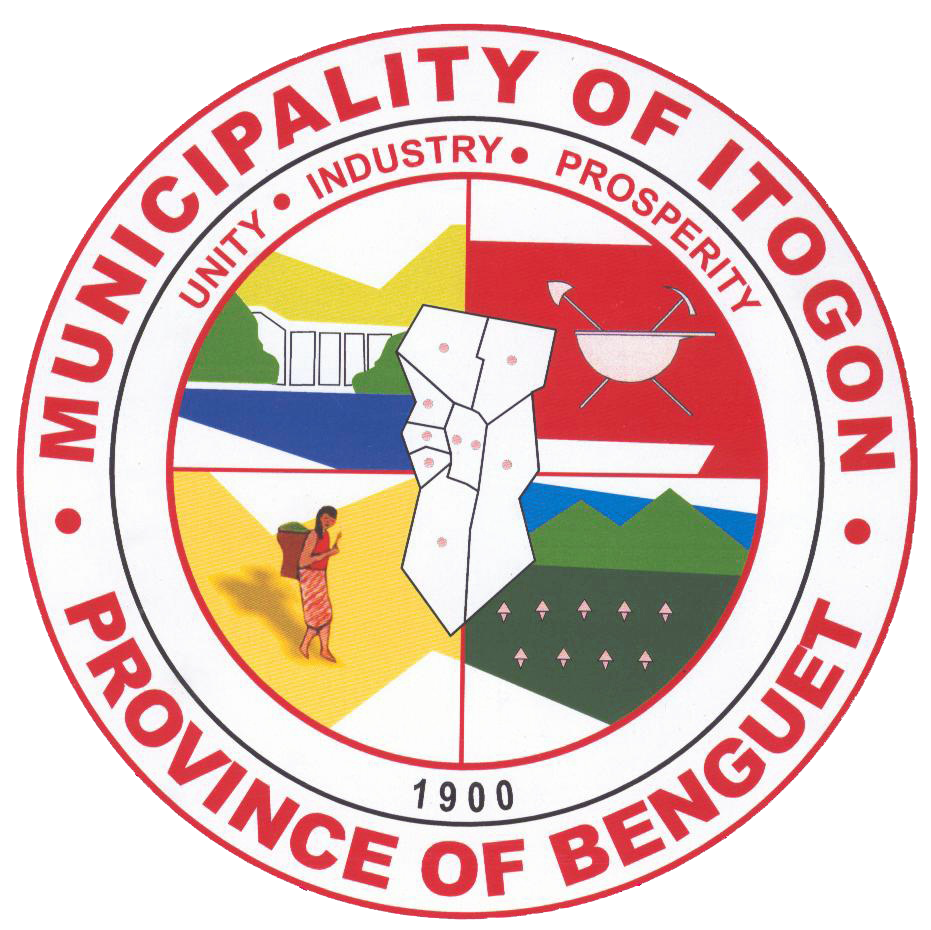
- Flag Seal

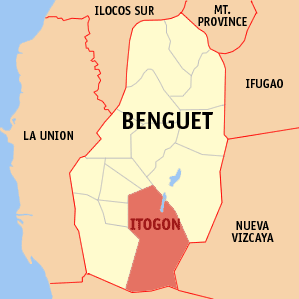
- Map of Benguet with Itogon highlighted
- Interactive map of Itogon
- Location within the Philippines
- Coordinates: 16°22′N 120°40′E
- Country: Philippines
- Region: Cordillera Administrative Region
- Province: Benguet
- District: Lone district
- Founded: May 15, 1951
- Barangays: 9 (see Barangays)

Government
  - Type: Sangguniang Bayan
  - Mayor: Bernard S. Waclin
  - Vice Mayor: Dante Alain Xavier “DAX” D. Godio
  - Representative: Eric Go Yap
  - Municipal Council: Members: Cesar A. Altiga; Norberto I. Pacio; Clint D. Galutan; Albert C. Galantes Jr.; Lucky B. Busacay; Albino A. Diego; Alejandro L. Palangdan; Noel D. Bilibli
  - Electorate: 33,361 voters (2025)

Area
  - Total: 449.73 km^{2} (173.64 sq mi)
- Elevation: 1,003 m (3,291 ft)
- Highest elevation: 1,671 m (5,482 ft)
- Lowest elevation: 404 m (1,325 ft)

Population (2024 census)
  - Total: 59,736
  - Density: 132.83/km^{2} (344.02/sq mi)
  - Households: 15,209

Economy
  - Income class: 1st municipal income class
  - Poverty incidence: 4.73% (2023)
  - Revenue: ₱ 497.4 million (2024)
  - Assets: ₱ 2,020 million (2024)
  - Expenditure: ₱ 437.7 million (2024)
  - Liabilities: ₱ 287.7 million (2024)

Service provider
  - Electricity: Benguet Electric Cooperative (BENECO)
- Time zone: UTC+8 (PST)
- ZIP code: 2604
- PSGC: 1401106000
- IDD : area code: +63 (0)74
- Native languages: Kankanaey; Ibaloi; I-Wak; Ilocano; Tagalog
- Website: www.itogon.gov.ph

Itogon, officially the Municipality of Itogon, (Ilocano: Ili ti Itogon; Tagalog: Bayan ng Itogon), is a municipality in the province of Benguet, Philippines. According to the 2024 census, it has a population of 59,736 people.

It is a mining town, being the site of the first large-scale mining operations in the country. The town is also the site of Binga Dam, managed and operated by the SN Aboitiz Power - Benguet, Inc.

== History ==
=== Spanish period ===
During the Spanish Regime, a native of the historic pueblo of Itogon (or Itokhon), named Codeng, was appointed by the Spanish authorities as capitan of another nearby village, Balingway (currently Itogon Central/Proper). Balingway was later established as a town site and renamed after Codeng's native place.

=== American period ===
During the American rule, Itogon was established as one of the 19 townships of the province of Benguet, upon the issuance of Act No. 48 by the Philippine Commission on November 22, 1900.

Mining operations started in Itogon in 1903, after Benguet Corporation, the Philippines' first mining firm, was established in the town under the name, Benguet Consolidated Mining Company (BCMC), by Americans Nelson Peterson and Harry Clyde.

On August 13, 1908, Benguet was established as a sub-province of the newly created Mountain Province with the enactment of Act No. 1876. As a result, six townships of Benguet were abolished, but Itogon remained a constituent town of Benguet sub-province.

=== World War II ===
Guerrilla forces in Northern Luzon launch a successful attack on the Itogon Mining District on October 15, 1942, drawing Japanese attention. This results in the Japanese pouring more troops in Luzon Island.

=== Post-war era ===
In 1948, plans by the National Power Corporation (NAPOCOR) for a second dam construction along the Agno River in the province of Benguet started, after the Ambuklao Dam construction commenced in Bokod. Bulldozers started clearing the forested area of the Guissit Mountains in 1954 for the Binga Dam. Construction of the dam took 3 years and 9 months, from August 1956 until its formal operations opening in May 1960.

On May 15, 1951, the town was converted into a regular municipality from the former municipal district of the same name, with the enactment of Republic Act No. 616.

On June 18, 1966, the sub-province of Benguet was separated from the old Mountain Province and was converted into a regular province. Itogon remained to be a component municipality of the newly established province.

== Geography ==
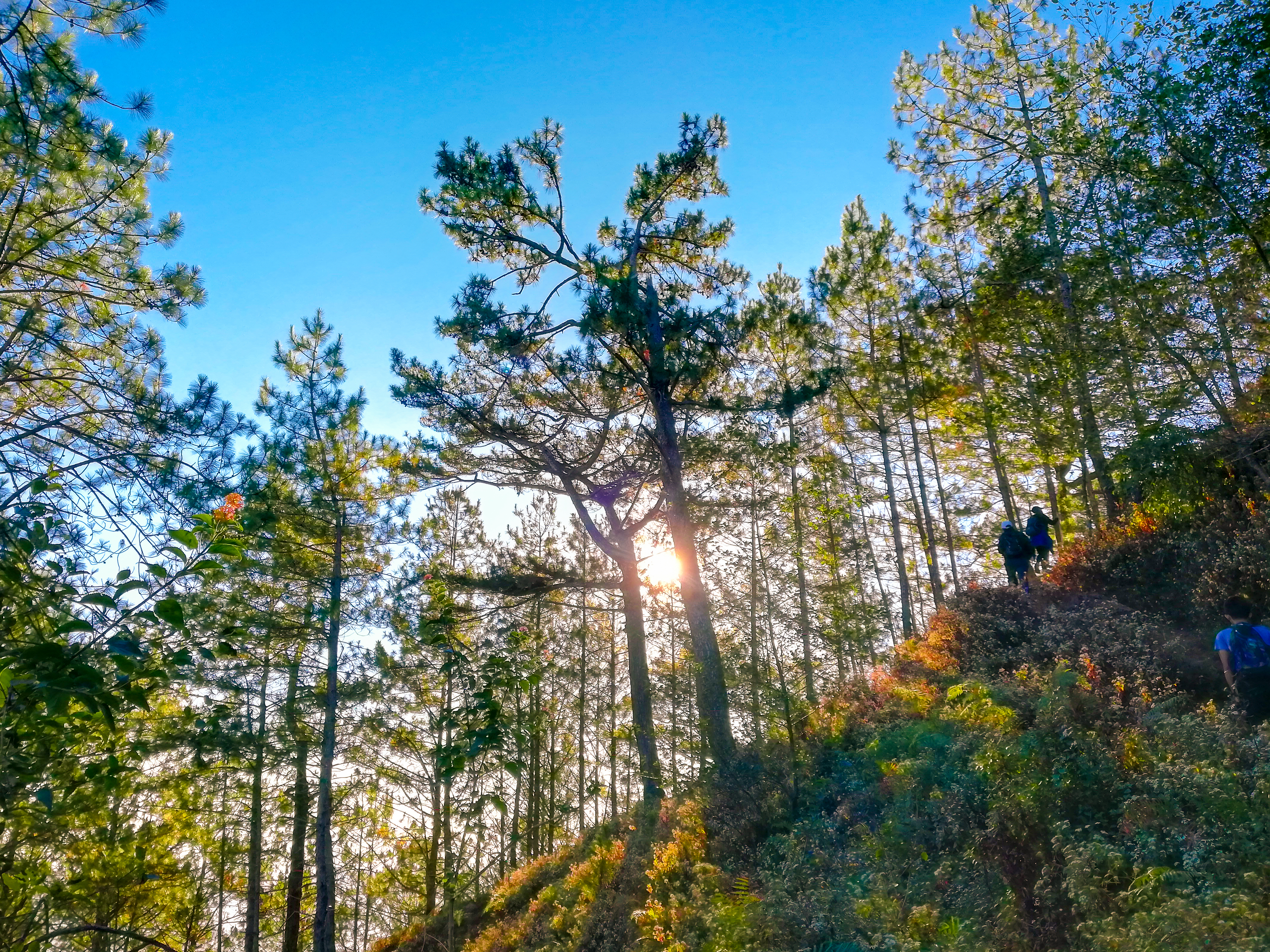
A forest in Mount Ulap

The Municipality of Itogon is located at 16°22′N 120°40′E, at the southeast end of the Benguet, forming a border with the provinces of Nueva Vizcaya (on the east) and Pangasinan (on the south). The town is bounded by Baguio and the municipality of Tuba on the west, La Trinidad and Tublay on the north-west, Bokod on the north-east, Kayapa and Santa Fe on the southeast, San Manuel and San Nicolas on the south, and Sison on the south-west.

According to the Philippine Statistics Authority, the municipality has a land area of 449.73 square kilometres (173.64 sq mi) constituting 16.24% of the 2,769.08-square-kilometre- (1,069.15 sq mi) total area of Benguet. It is the largest municipality in Benguet by land area. Around 80 percent of the municipality's land area is protected as part of the Lower Agno Watershed Forest Reserve and Upper Agno River Basin Resource Reserve. The Agno River traverses the municipality and is impounded at Binga (19 kilometres or 12 miles from the Ambuklao Dam in Bokod) forming the Binga Dam.

Itogon is situated 21.74 kilometres (13.51 mi) from the provincial capital La Trinidad, and 255.01 kilometres (158.46 mi) from the country's capital city of Manila.

=== Barangays ===
Itogon is politically subdivided into 9 barangays. Each barangay consists of puroks and some have sitios.

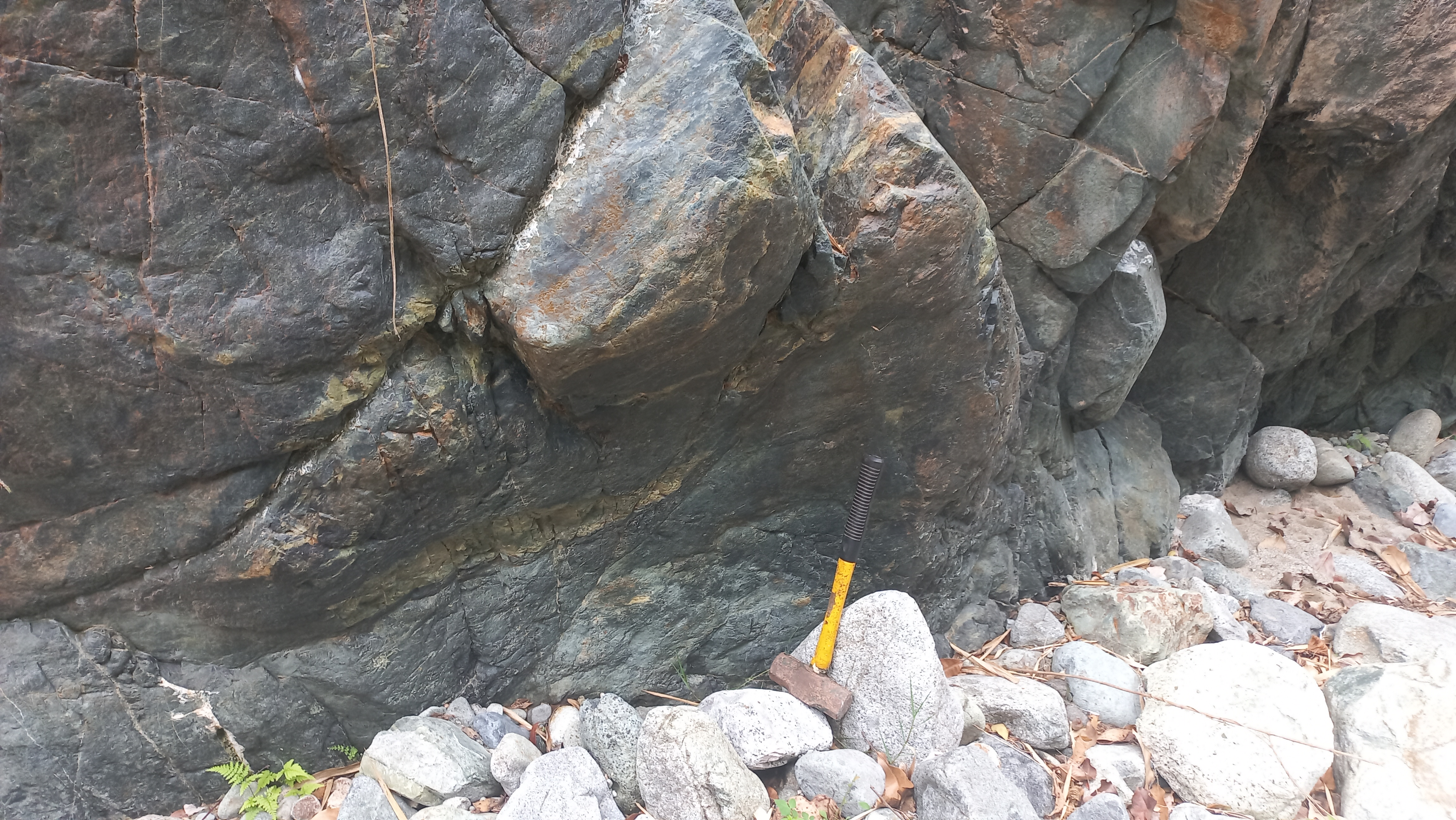
An outcrop of metamorphosed basalt (greenschist) in barangay Tinungdan

PSGC	Barangay	Population			±% p.a.	
		2024		2010		
141106001	Ampucao	18.3%	10,924	10,450	▴	0.31%
141106002	Dalupirip	4.8%	2,862	2,578	▴	0.72%
141106003	Gumatdang	2.9%	1,709	1,895	▾	−0.71%
141106004	Loacan	14.0%	8,378	7,714	▴	0.57%
141106005	Poblacion (Central)	7.1%	4,221	3,267	▴	1.78%
141106006	Tinongdan	6.1%	3,646	4,216	▾	−0.99%
141106007	Tuding	17.1%	10,211	7,703	▴	1.96%
141106008	Ucab	14.6%	8,751	7,870	▴	0.73%
141106009	Virac	18.1%	10,796	10,267	▴	0.35%
	Total		59,736	61,498	▾	−0.20%

=== Climate ===
Climate data for Itogon, Benguet
Month	Jan	Feb	Mar	Apr	May	Jun	Jul	Aug	Sep	Oct	Nov	Dec	Year
Mean daily maximum °C (°F)	25 (77)	26 (79)	28 (82)	29 (84)	27 (81)	26 (79)	25 (77)	24 (75)	25 (77)	25 (77)	26 (79)	26 (79)	26 (79)
Mean daily minimum °C (°F)	15 (59)	16 (61)	17 (63)	19 (66)	20 (68)	20 (68)	20 (68)	20 (68)	19 (66)	18 (64)	17 (63)	16 (61)	18 (65)
Average precipitation mm (inches)	15 (0.6)	16 (0.6)	24 (0.9)	33 (1.3)	102 (4.0)	121 (4.8)	177 (7.0)	165 (6.5)	144 (5.7)	170 (6.7)	56 (2.2)	23 (0.9)	1,046 (41.2)
Average rainy days	6.3	6.6	9.5	12.8	20.6	23.5	25.4	23.4	23.2	21.4	14.0	8.2	194.9
Source: Meteoblue

== Demographics ==
Population census of Itogon
Year	Pop.	±% p.a.
1903	29	—
1918	3,167	+36.74%
1939	35,179	+12.15%
1948	16,970	−7.78%
1960	32,742	+5.63%
1970	39,834	+1.98%
1975	41,081	+0.62%
1980	47,605	+2.99%
1990	61,773	+2.64%
1995	47,781	−4.70%
2000	46,705	−0.49%
2007	48,778	+0.60%
2010	55,960	+5.13%
2015	59,820	+1.28%
2020	61,498	+0.58%
2024	59,736	−0.70%
Source: Philippine Statistics Authority

In the 2024 census, Itogon had a population of 59,736 people. The population density was 130 inhabitants per square kilometre (340/sq mi).

Generally inhabited by 60 percent Ibalois, 40 percent Kankanaey, and other ethnicities such as the Ilocano, Itogon was the most populous municipality in the province, with a population of 61,773 in the 1990 census. Its population abruptly declined five years after as illustrated in the census of 1995.

== Economy ==
Poverty incidence of Itogon (%)

Source: Philippine Statistics Authority

Itogon's main source of livelihood is mining. Secondary to mining is agriculture. Major mining companies which operate in the town include Benguet Corporation, Philex Mining Corporation, Atok Big Wedge Mining Company (now called Atok Gold Mining Company) and Itogon Suyoc Mines.

== Government ==
Itogon, belonging to the lone congressional district of the province of Benguet, is governed by a mayor designated as its local chief executive and by a municipal council as its legislative body in accordance with the Local Government Code. The mayor, vice mayor, and the councilors are elected directly by the people through an election which is being held every three years.

=== Elected officials ===
Members of the Municipal Council (2025-2028)
Position	Name
Congressman	Eric Yap
Mayor	Bernard S. Waclin
Vice-Mayor	Dante Alain Xavier “DAX” D. Godio
Councilors	Cesar A. Altiga
Councilors	Norberto I. Pacio
Councilors	Clint D. Galutan
Councilors	Albert C. Galantes Jr.
Councilors	Lucky B. Busacay
Councilors	Albino A. Diego
Councilors	Alejandro L. Palangdan
Councilors	Noel D. Bilibli

== Tourism ==
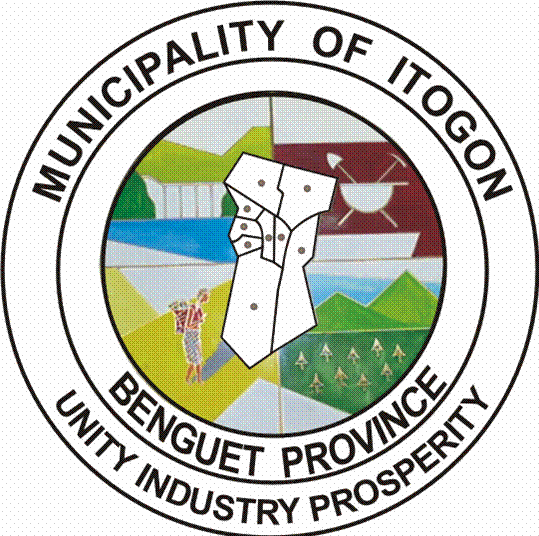
Alternate rendering of current seal

Former seal of Itogon

Known tourist destination areas in Itogon include the Binga Dam in Tinongdan and Balatoc Mines Tours in Balatoc, Virac. Other tourist spots include the open pit mines in Loacan, hot spring in Dalupirip, Mount Ugo in Tinongdan, Level 1300 swimming pools in Poblacion with hot steams and bath and the mummies in Domolpos also in Tinongdan.

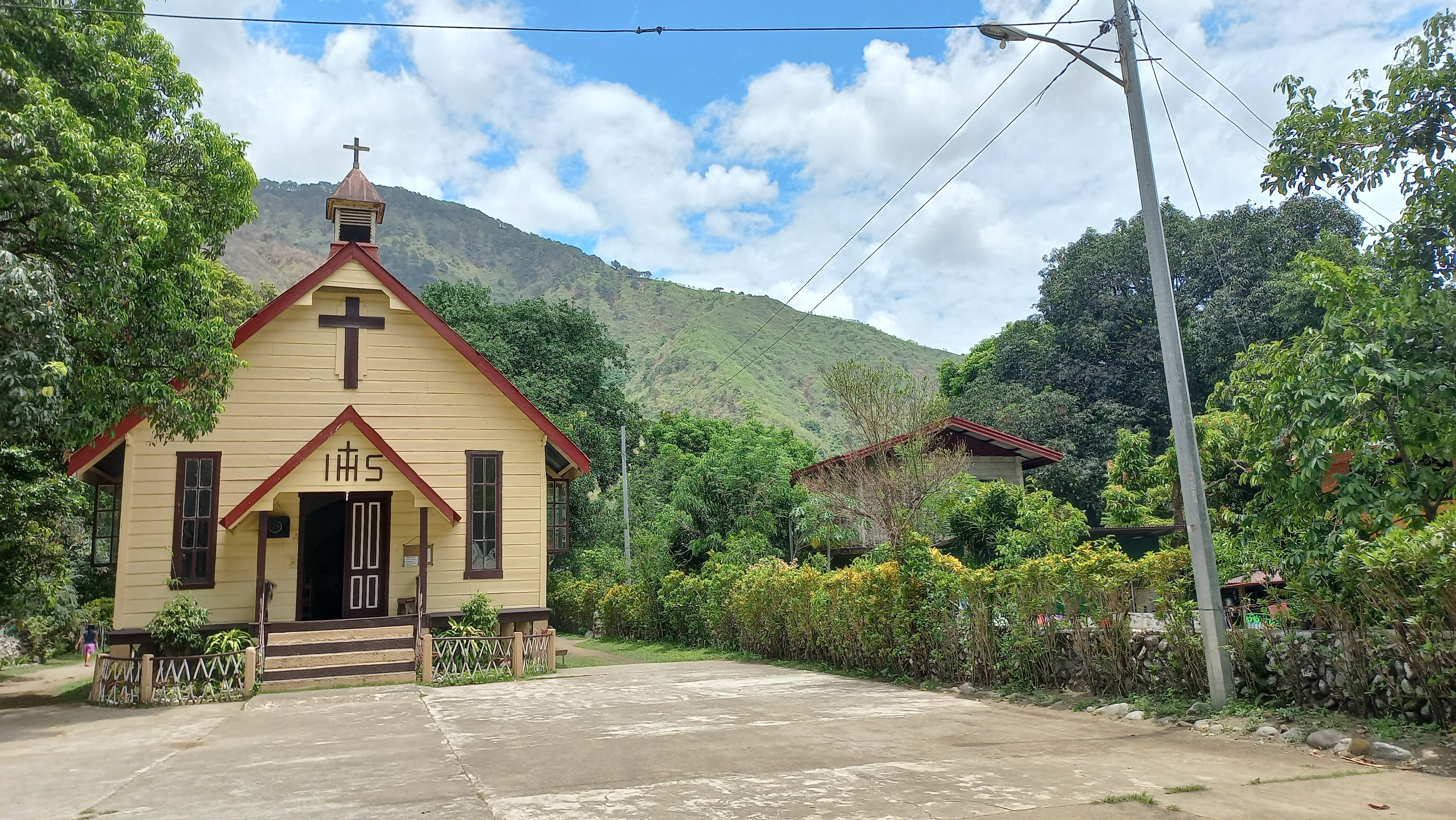
St. Joseph Heritage Church in barangay Dalupirip.

== Transportation ==
Highways through Itogon:

- Baguio–Bua–Itogon National Road
- Ambuklao Road
- Benguet–Nueva Vizcaya Road

== Education ==
There are two schools districe offices which govern all educational institutions within the municipality. They oversee the management and operations of all private and public, from primary to secondary schools. These are Itogon I Schools District Office, and Itogon II Schools District Office.

=== Public schools ===
As of 2014, Itogon has 39 public elementary schools and 7 public secondary schools.

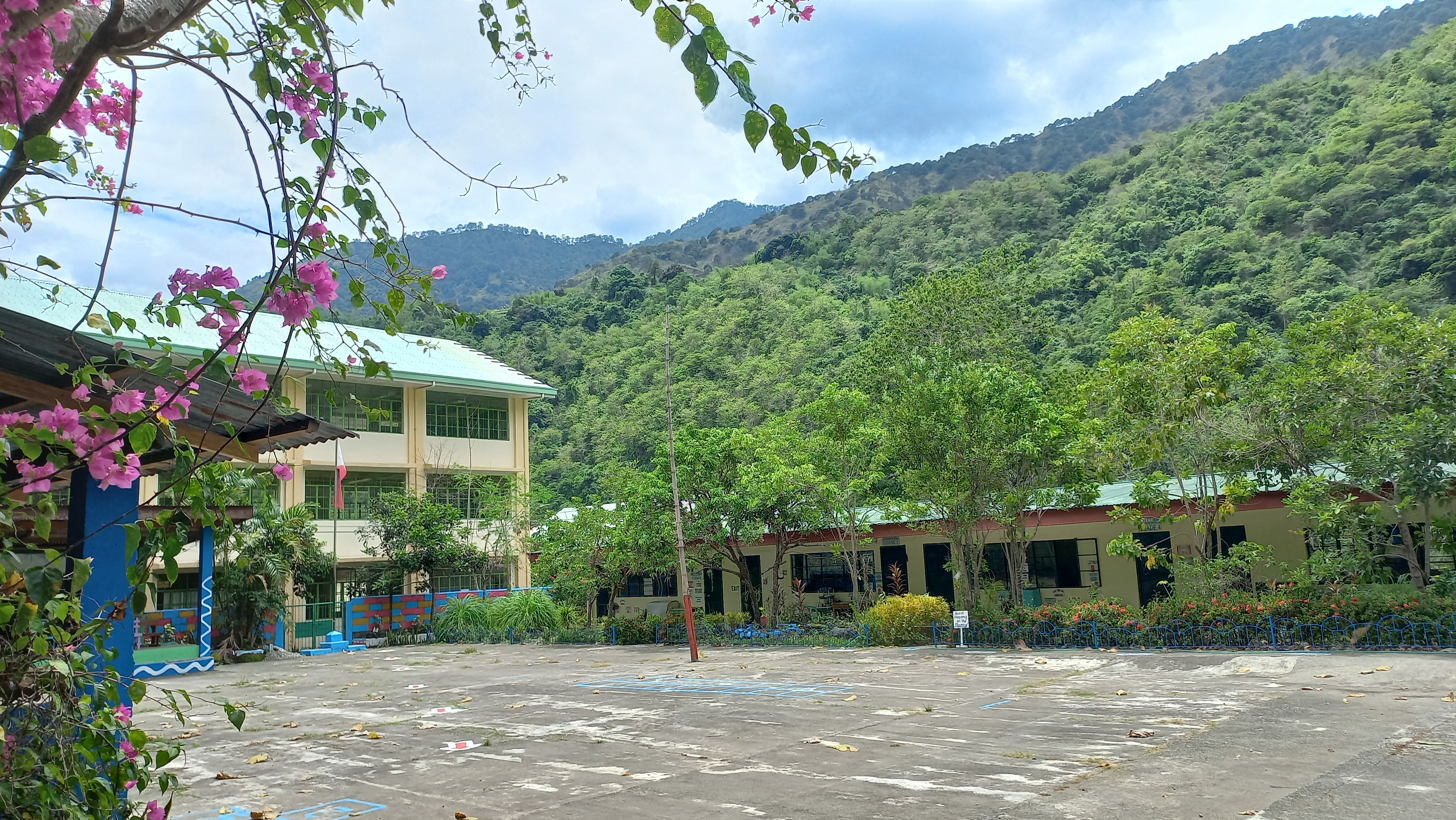
School buildings and quadrangle of the Fianza Elementary School in Dalupirip, Itogon, Benguet.

Elementary (2013-2014)
School	Barangay
Acupan Elementary School	Virac
Ampucao Elementary School	Ampucao
Baguio Gold Elementary School	Tuding
Balatoc Elementary School	Virac
Banget Elementary School	Ampucao
Binga Elementary School	Tinongdan
Botic Elementary School	Tinongdan
Dalicno Elementary School	Ampucao
Daynet Elementary School	Ampucao
Domolpos Community School	Tinongdan
Fianza Elementary School	Dalupirip
Goldfield Primary School	Poblacion
Gold Creek Elementary School	Ucab
Gumatdang Elementary School	Gumatdang
Itogon Central School	Poblacion
Jose F. Opiles Elementary School	Tinongdan
Lab-ang Community School	Ampucao
Labilab Elementary School	Loacan
Lawiguen Community School	Dalupirip
Liang Primary School	Loacan
Loacan Elementary School	Loacan
Luneta Elementary School	Loacan
Lusod Community School	Tinongdan
Manganese Elementary School	Ampucao
Maximino Fianza Lopez Elementary School	Loacan
Midas Elementary School	Ucab
Oling Elementary School	Dalupirip
Pacalso Elementary School	Tuding
Saybuan Primary School	Tinongdan
Sayo Primary School	Dalupirip
Simpa Primary School	Ampucao
Solomon Solano Elementary School	Poblacion
Tabu Community School	Dalupirip
Tapsan Elementary School	Ampucao
Tinongdan Elementary School	Tinongdan
Tocmo Elementary School	Loacan
Tuding Elementary School	Tuding
Ucab Elementary School	Ucab
Virac Elementary School	Virac

Secondary (2013-2014)
School	Barangay
Alejo M. Pacalso Memorial National High School	Tuding
Ampucao National High School	Ampucao
Binga National High School	Tinongdan
Fianza Memorial National High School	Tinongdan
Laurencio Fianza National High School	Dalupirip
Laurencio Fianza National High School - Bantic Annex	Dalupirip
Loacan National High School	Loacan

=== Private schools ===
- Sacred Heart High School of Itogon
- Saint Louis High School of Antamok
- Saint Louis High School of Balatoc
- Saint Louis High School of Philex
