= VOA1 =

Voice of America 1
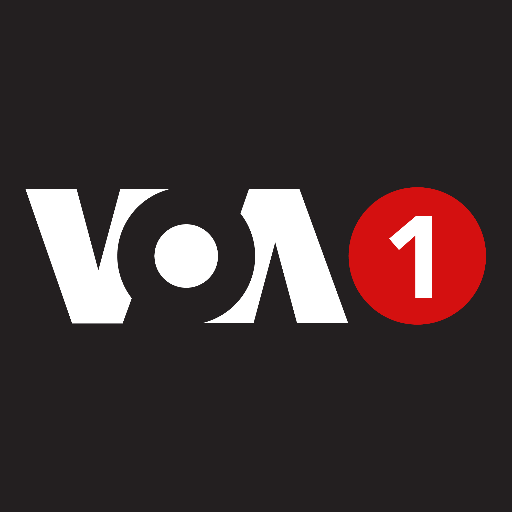

Washington, D.C.; United States of America
- Broadcast area: Worldwide (online, or via syndication to selected stations)
- Branding: VOA1

Programming
- Language: English, Spanish
- Format: Top 40/CHR
- Network: Voice of America

Ownership
- Owner: Voice of America

Links
- Webcast: Listen live
- Website: www.voanews.com/t/92.html

VOA1 is a music radio service that is operated by Voice of America, an American international broadcasting company. Voice of America is headquartered in Washington, D.C. VOA's service primarily include continuous 24-hour online webcasts on stations internationally. Additionally, VOA1 is prominently featured on the primary feed of VOA radio.

The programming on VOA1 primarily follows a Top 40 music format, with 5-minute newscasts presented at the start of each hour.

== History ==
In 1985, VOA Europe was established as a special radio service in English, accessible through satellite to AM, FM, as well as cable affiliates throughout Europe. With a contemporary format including live disc jockeys, the network presented top musical hits, VOA news, and features of local interest 24 hours a day.

VOA Europe was closed down without public notice in January 1997 as a cost-cutting measure. It was succeeded by VOA Express, which, from July 4, 1999, was revamped into VOA Music Mix. On November 1, 2014, VOA Music Mix was rebranded as VOA1.

== Programs ==
- Border Crossings
- Today’s Hit Countdown
- Country Hits VOA
- Jazz America
- Soul Lounge
