= Escalante, Negros Occidental =

Component city in Negros Occidental, Philippines

Escalante
- Component city
- City of Escalante
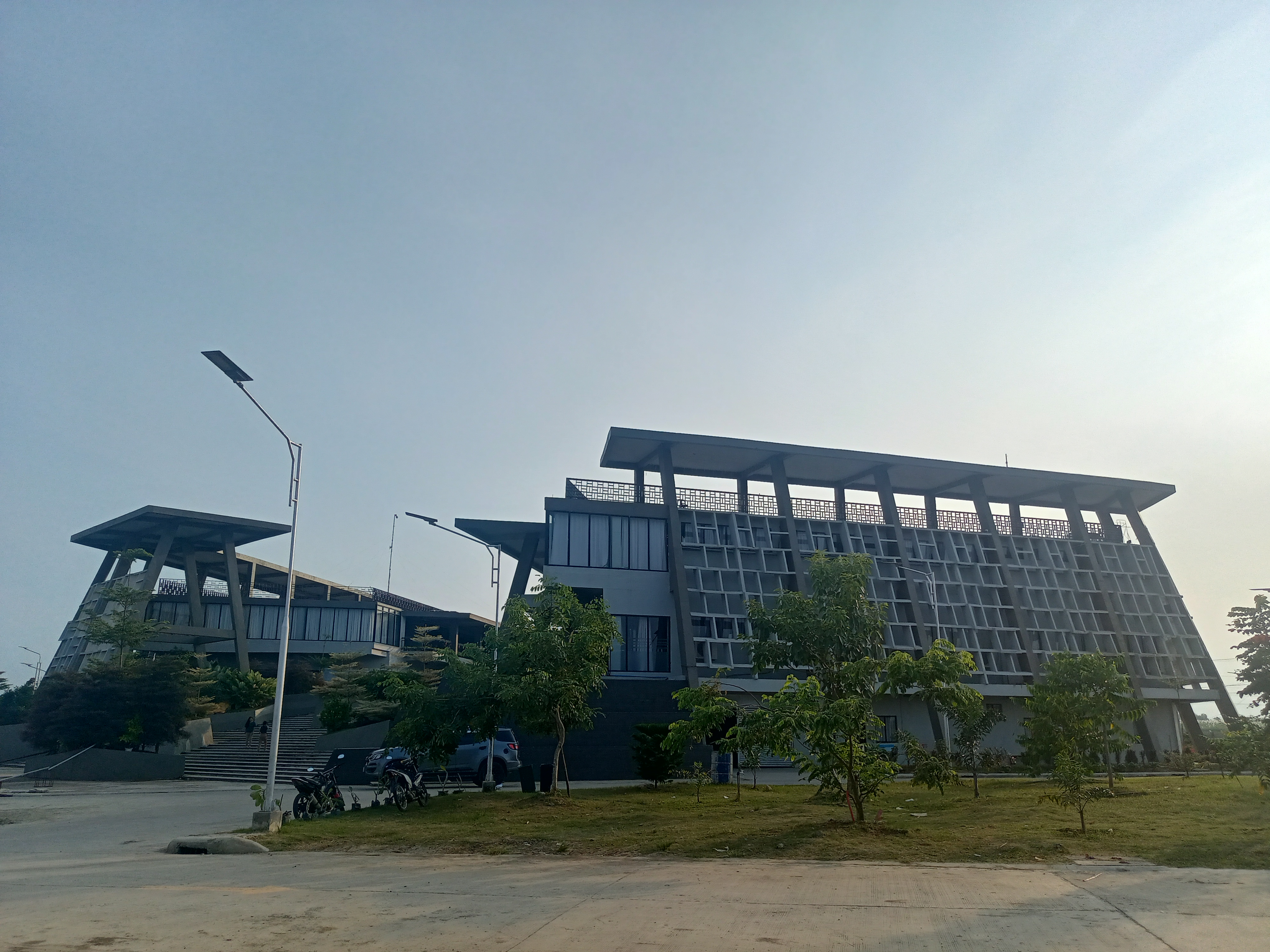
- The Pentagon (Escalante New Government Center and City Hall)

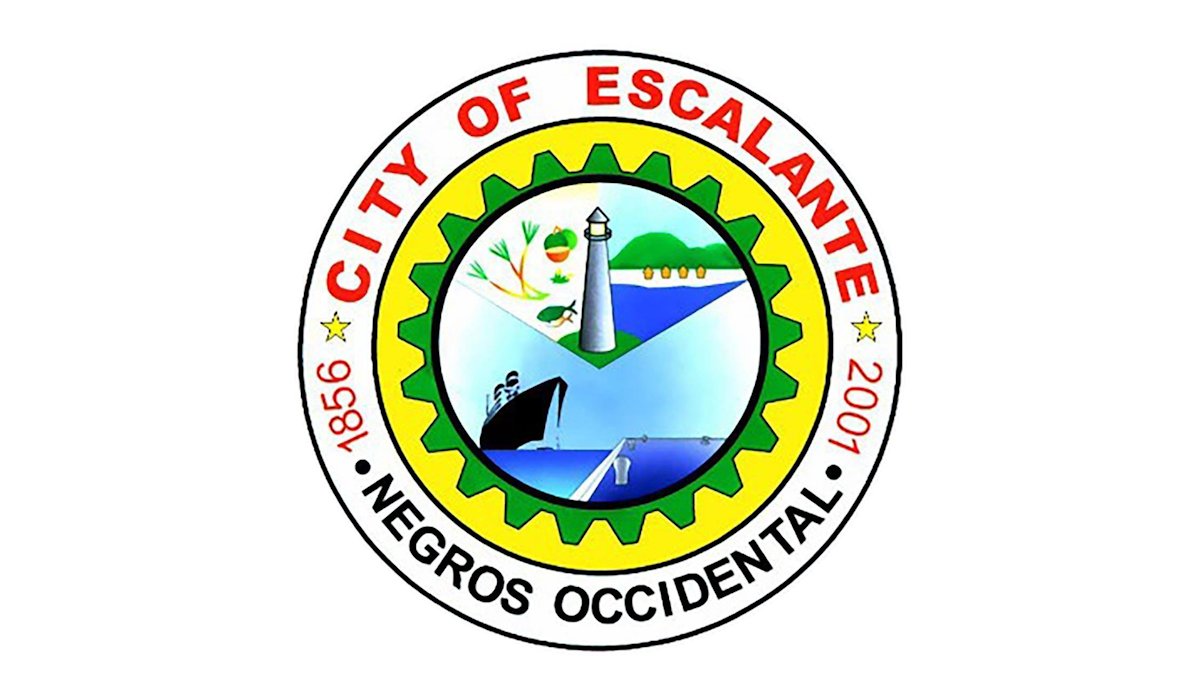
- Flag Seal
- Nickname: Yutang Bulahan
- Motto: "Escalante, Lahi ra jud!" (English: Escalante, Truly Different!) "Alegre, Escalante!" (English: Lively/Fun-filled, Escalante!) "Siga Escalante!" (English: Shine Escalante!)
- Anthem: Escalante, Yutang Bulahan! (English: Escalante, Blessed Land!)
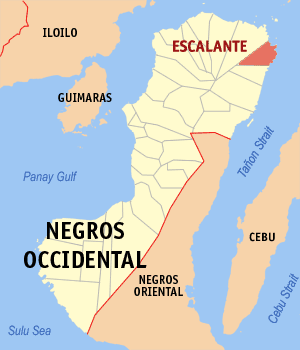
- Map of Negros Occidental with Escalante highlighted
- Interactive map of Escalante
- Location within the Philippines
- Coordinates: 10°50′N 123°30′E
- Country: Philippines
- Region: Negros Island Region
- Province: Negros Occidental
- District: 1st district
- Founded: November 28, 1856
- Cityhood: March 31, 2001
- Named for: Escalante, Spain
- Barangays: 21 (see Barangays)

Government
  - Type: Sangguniang Panlungsod
  - Mayor: Melecio J. Yap Jr.
  - Vice Mayor: Rogelio A. Prietos (NPC)
  - Representative: Julio A. Ledesma IV (NPC)
  - City Council: Members: Virgie Abong-Pastor; Johnny A. Gabriel; Manuel L. Zamora; Erson D. Escala; William V. Saratobias; Virgilio V. Gamao; Rosario E. Manguilimotan; Angelina T. Encarguez; Bernardino S. Patigas, Jr.; Richardy C. Pios, Sr.
  - Electorate: 64,099 voters (2025)

Area
  - Total: 192.76 km^{2} (74.43 sq mi)
- Elevation: 41 m (135 ft)
- Highest elevation: 660 m (2,170 ft)
- Lowest elevation: −1 m (−3.3 ft)

Population (2024 census)
  - Total: 97,050
  - Density: 503.5/km^{2} (1,304/sq mi)
  - Households: 24,652

Economy
  - Income class: 3rd city income class
  - Poverty incidence: 23.34% (2023)
  - Revenue: ₱ 967.9 million (2024)
  - Assets: ₱ 2,774 million (2024)
  - Expenditure: ₱ 898.4 million (2024)
  - Liabilities: ₱ 845.3 million (2024)

Service provider
  - Electricity: Northern Negros Electric Cooperative (NONECO)
- Time zone: UTC+8 (PST)
- ZIP code: 6124
- PSGC: 064509000
- IDD : area code: +63 (0)34
- Native languages: Hiligaynon; Cebuano; Tagalog
- Website: www.escalantecity.gov.ph

Escalante, officially the City of Escalante (Cebuano: Dakbayan sa Escalante; Hiligaynon: Dakbanwa sang Escalante; Filipino: Lungsod ng Escalante), is a component city in the province of Negros Occidental, Philippines. According to the 2024 census, it has a population of 97,050 people. The city celebrates the annual "Manlambus Festival" every May 30.

== Etymology ==
The town was originally called “Manlambus,” a Visayan term meaning “to strike with a club,” referring to traditional fishing methods used in its coastal waters. Upon its establishment, it was renamed Escalante after the hometown in Spain of the then-governor and parish priest, which bore the same name.

== History ==
=== Pre-Spanish era ===
Virtually nothing is known of Escalante during the pre-Hispanic era. But archaeological findings in October 1975 and May 1976 made by a team of Anthropology students led by Professor Lionel Chiong of Silliman University reveal an early record of men who inhabited not only the present city but also the island of Negros during the pre-Spanish time. The findings were recovered in nine graves in what seemed to be an ancient burial ground in Barangay Japitan, a coastal barangay lying along the Tañon Strait, facing the island of Cebu, some 17 kilometers from the city proper. The artifacts consisted of celadon plate and bowls, stoneware bowls and jars, a Sung Dynasty (960-1280 A.D.) jarlet, gold beads, iron implements, daggers and a hunting knife with an ivory bone handle.

Obviously buried with the dead, the plate, bowls, jars and iron implements were found alongside the skeletal remains, the daggers and hunting knives on top of the breast section and the gold beads inside the skulls in-between the upper and lower jaws. When carbon-14 tested, these findings together with the human skeletal remains were found to date as far back as the 12th century A.D. All this proved that present-day Escalante was inhabited by settlers with a relatively developed culture who were engaged in some form of trade and commerce with the outside world, such as the Chinese and Japanese traders who could have brought the jarlet, stoneware and celadon pieces during the Ages of Contacts and Trade with the East (11th & 12th centuries A.D.)

=== Spanish era ===
The northeastern part of Negros Island was "one of the most cultivated regions" in the mid-19th century.

On November 28, 1856, Governor-General Manuel Crespo issued a decree creating the towns of Escalante and Saravia. The decree ordered "that the two towns in question would be separated immediately from their mother town, Silay," although the spiritual separation of the two "would await the building of churches and convents in Saravia and Escalante." The latter had its seat of government in the barrio of Nueva Sevilla (Barangay Old Poblacion).

The Parish of Escalante was finally established on May 22, 1860, with Fr. Cipriano Navarro, OAR, as the first Parish Priest. Fr. Navarro, in a report to the Recollect Provincial in 1861, wrote that the inhabitants of his parish and its 14 barrios lying along the northeast portion of the island from Calatrava to Himogaan "speak the Cebuano dialect and all, or the majority, came from Cebu, with the exception of those from Barrio Marianas (Himogaan) . . . who came from the district of Iloilo and speak the Hiligaynon dialect."

In 1859, a politico-Military Command was established in Bacolod under Governor Emilio E. Saravia with six towns under its jurisdiction: Escalante, Guihulngan, Jinuboan, Jimalalud, Tayasan, and Ayungon. Two more were added, Arguelles (Sagay) and Calatrava when these were created into separate towns on July 3, 1863. This ended with the division of Negros into two provinces in 1889.

Schools for boys and girls were established in the late 1860s. By 1869, a school for boys and another for girls were already operating in the town. By 1890, these schools were among the very few managed by Normal School graduates.

As early as 1871, Escalante was a major link between Bacolod and Cebu. A mail service route, Bacolod-Escalante-Tuburan-Toledo, Cebu was already exclusively in use by May 1871. In 1875 a mail boat belonging to Emerenciano Amante, the gobernadorcillo (mayor) of Escalante, transported mail between Toledo and Escalante every week.

A telegraphic station was established in 1894. The telegraphic cable was extended later on to Tuburan, Cebu and was operational by October 1897.

The inhabitants of the town lived from subsistence agriculture. They produced among others, rice, corn, buri, edible root crops, and tobacco. Their second most important economic activity was fishing.

Tobacco was grown commercially but its production decreased when monopoly was established starting from the time of Don Emilio Saravia (1855–1857), the first politico-military of the Negros Island. In its stead, sugarcane was gradually being grown. It was not clear when the first sugar mill was established in town. But by 1891, Escalante had already 6 steam-engine sugar mills; 36 powered by horses; and 11 by carabaos. Approximately 848 hectares were planted to sugarcane.

=== American era ===
The American period covering some 45 years (December 1898 to July 3, 1946, except for a few years under the Japanese occupation) saw marked changes in the socio-cultural, economic and political complexion of the area and its people. To capture the hearts and minds of the inhabitants without the use of guns and cannons, the Americans opened the first free elementary school at Old Poblacion in the early 1900s.

A Gabaldon-type elementary school building was constructed at Old Poblacion during the term of Mayor Fernando Lucot (1912–1918). The municipal hall and the town plaza were constructed and developed during the time of Francisco Ferrer, Sr. Also at this time, the first municipal school site where the first elementary school was located, was formally acquired, and the installation of the Rizal Monument at the public plaza completed. The municipal portal and Rizal Monument was built on September 15, 1955. The bandstand and skating rink were constructed on September 28, 1935.

=== Japanese era ===
In 1942, the occupation by the Japanese Imperial forces entered the towns in Escalante. The establishment of the general headquarters of the Philippine Commonwealth Army was active on January 3, 1942, to June 30, 1946, and the 7th Infantry Regiment of the Philippine Constabulary was active again on October 28, 1944, to June 30, 1946, and military stationed in the town municipality of Escalante during the Japanese Occupation.

In 1945, local Filipino soldiers of the 7th, 72nd, 75th and 76th Infantry Division of the Philippine Commonwealth Army and the 7th Constabulary Regiment of the Philippine Constabulary was liberated the towns in Escalante, Negros Occidental and helping Negrosanon guerrilla fighters defeats and attacking Japanese Imperial forces and ended of the Second World War.

In 1941, Victor Bedonia succeeded Francisco Ferrer Sr. as mayor, and was supported by the local guerillas. The siege of all Filipino troops of the Philippine Army and Constabulary units was found liberated in the town municipality on 1945 against the Japanese. He served until 1948. The Japanese however installed Enrique Ballesteros as mayor until the end of the war.

=== Post-war era ===
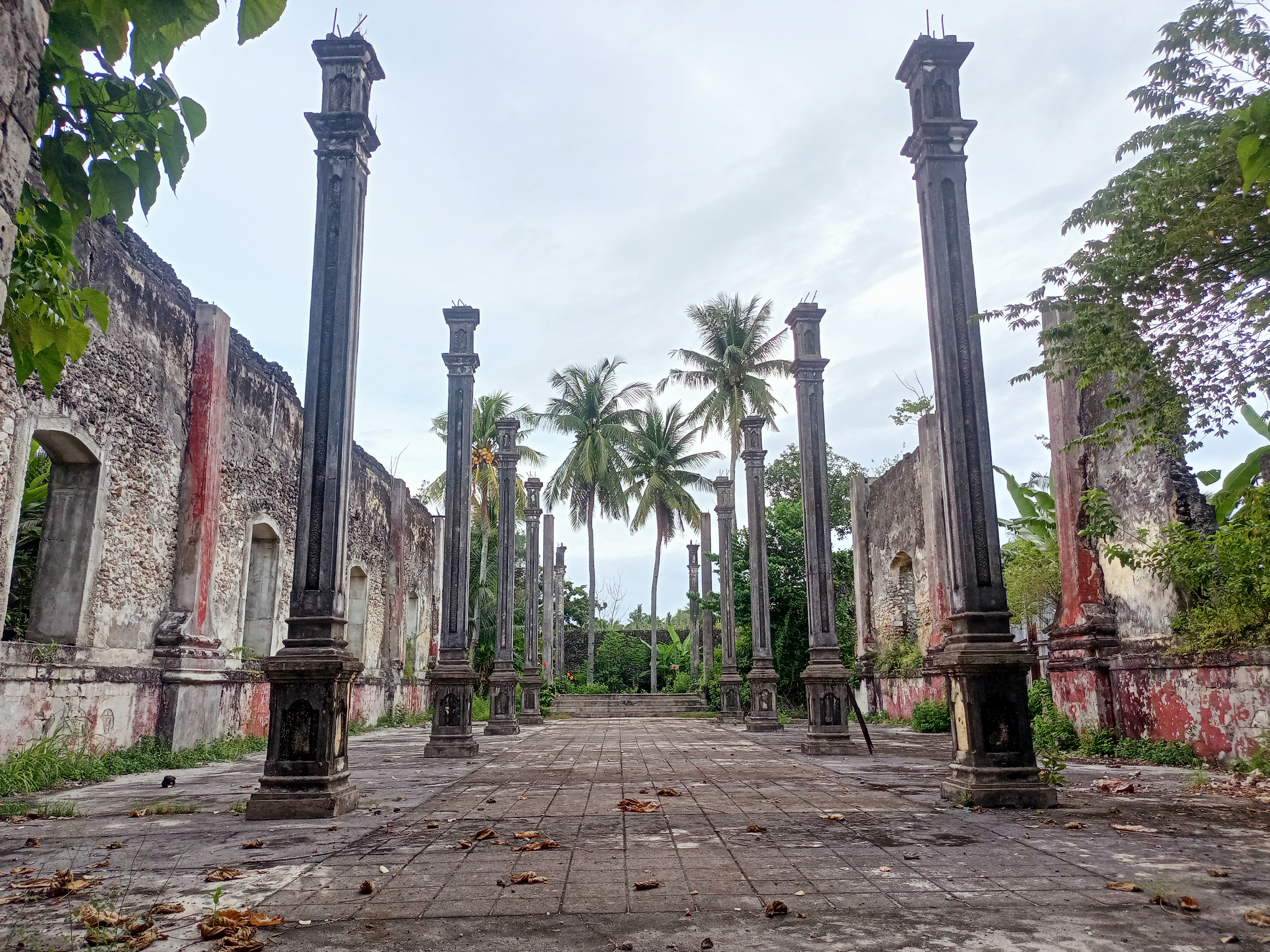
The Saint Francis of Assisi Old Church Ruins in Brgy. Old Poblacion, Escalante City built in 1860. It is classified as Historical Structure by virtue of NHI Resolution No. 3, series of October 22, 1991.

Two years after liberation, Escalante was divided into two municipalities. President Elpidio Quirino issued Executive Order 141 dated May 19, 1948 "Organizing certain barrios of the Municipality of Escalante, Province of Negros Occidental, into an independent municipality under the name Toboso", to take effect July 1, 1948. Victor Bedonia who was then the incumbent mayor of Escalante opted to become the first mayor of the newly created town of Toboso. Pedro Benignos took over until 1950. In 1951, Evaristo Sanz took over and was replaced thereafter by Amando Tambo. It was during Mayor Tambo's time when the seat of government, by virtue of Executive Order No. 301 issued by President Carlos P. Garcia on May 30, 1958, was transferred from Barangay Old Poblacion to its present site at Barangay Balintawak.

The first high school, the Escalante National High School, was donated by Manuel A. Lopez in 1946 and established in 1948. A decade later, in 1961, the Mount Carmel College was established by the Order of the Carmelites. Aside from the churches in the Municipality of Toboso, in Escalante and in Brgy Old. Poblacion, it also erected the Magdalen Hospital which was run by the Sisters of Julie Postel. This hospital is now called the Dr. Vicente Gustilo District Hospital, under the management of the Provincial Government. This placed the new town in an enviable position, not only being a center of higher education and quality medical care in this part of Negros.

This brought about profound changes in the socio-cultural, economic and political life of the town as it provided the much-needed opportunity for children of poor families in the area to acquire college education. Other public schools were opened up later on, such that there are now 27 public elementary schools, 6 national public high schools and 3 extension high schools.

=== The martial law years ===
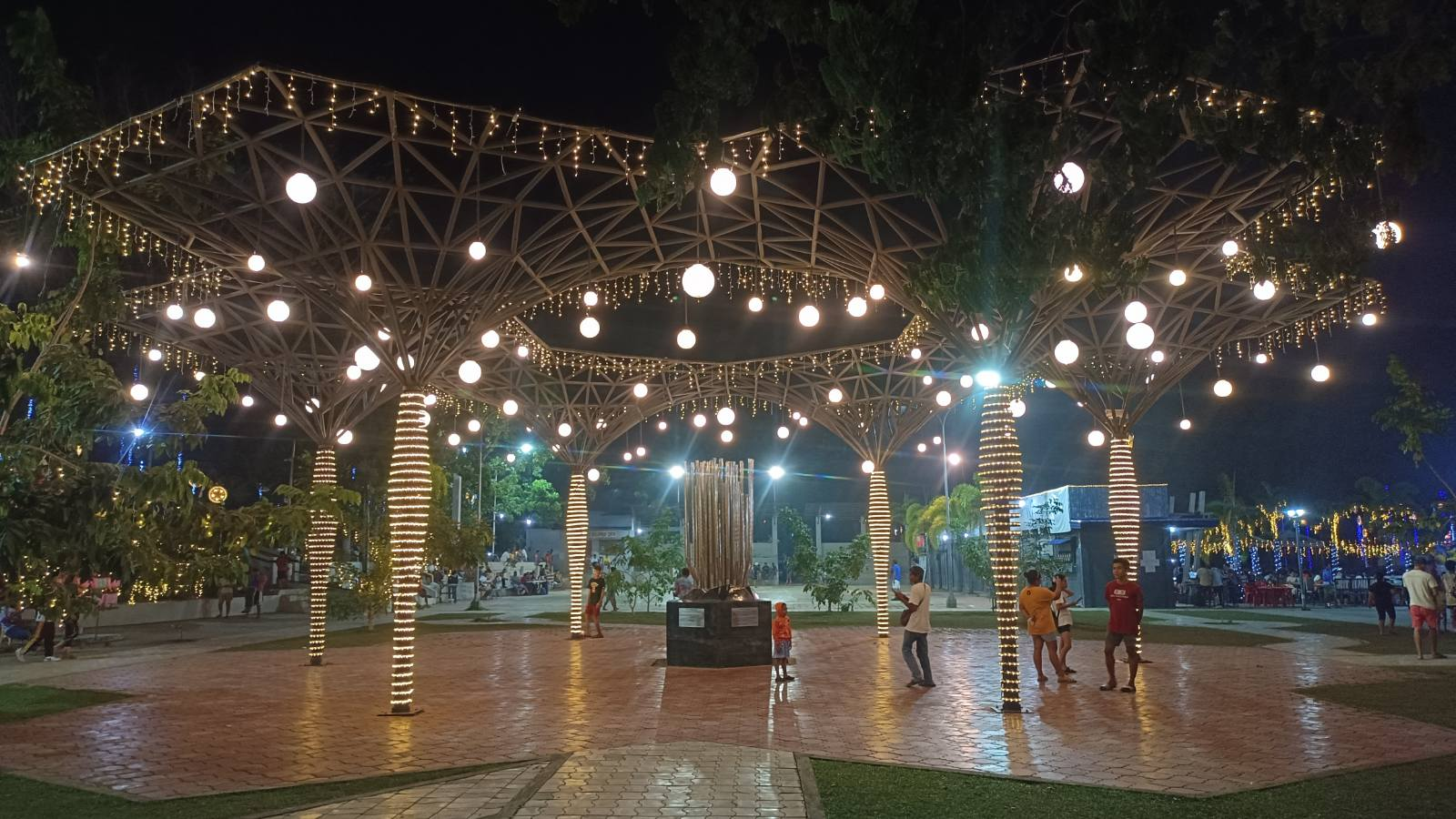
Present-day Escalante City Public Plaza, the site of the infamous Escalante massacre

During this time, a modern public market, new municipal building, and the 50,000-gallon reservoir was erected under the mayor Braulio P. Lumayno. The Martial Law Years was seemingly quiet. However, the uneven land distribution, marginal food production, and the excesses of the political system created so much discontent especially in the sugarcane farms. This was one of the reasons why the BAYAN-led "Welgang Bayan" which ended in the Escalante massacre. Twenty-one rallyists who were determined to paralyze traffic, died on the spot on the streets of Escalante when the militia of then-strongman Congressman Armando Gustilo, who was bent on dispersing the rally, fired their guns on rallyists. This event was one of the important factors for the downfall of the Marcos regime.

With the installation of Pres. Corazon C. Aquino, Mrs. Evelyn L. Hinolan was selected as OIC Mayor. Then BAYAN Chairman Rolando Ponsica, who was one of the persecuted during the Martial Law years, easily became the mayor in 1988.

=== Cityhood ===
Former seal of Escalante

After 143 years of existence as a municipality, under the leadership of Mayor Santiago G. Barcelona, Jr., Escalante was now qualified to become a city. On July 24, 1998, the Sangguniang Bayan of Escalante passed Resolution No. 98-79 "requesting the Congressman Julio A. Ledesma IV of the 1st District of Negros Occidental to file a bill in Congress creating / converting the Municipality of Escalante into a new City of Escalante." Six days later, Congressman Ledesma filed House Bill No. 1514 "An act converting the Municipality of Escalante into a component city to be known as the City of Escalante." President Joseph Estrada imposed a moratorium on conversion or creation of cities by memorandum on the same year, but it did not affect the house bill that converts Escalante into a city.

Congress went ahead with its enactment. After conducting a public hearing right here in the town on November 27, 1999, Congress passed the substitute bill, House Bill No. 8882, on second reading on December 9, 1999. More than a week later, it passed the bill on third and final reading.

A similar bill, Senate Bill No. 1786, was filed by Sen. Serge Osmeña III in the House of the Senate on October 22, 1999. Senate Bill No. 2245 (in substitution of Senate Bill No. 1786) was passed on third and final reading on February 8, 2001, the last session of the 11th Congress.

Both bills became Republic Act No. 9014, "An act converting the Municipality of Escalante, Province of Negros Occidental into a component city to be known as the City of Escalante." It was signed into law on February 28, 2001, by President Gloria Macapagal Arroyo, and was ratified in a plebiscite held on March 31, 2001. Of 14,723 who actually voted, 14,075 voted "YES" and only 648 voted "NO".

== Geography ==
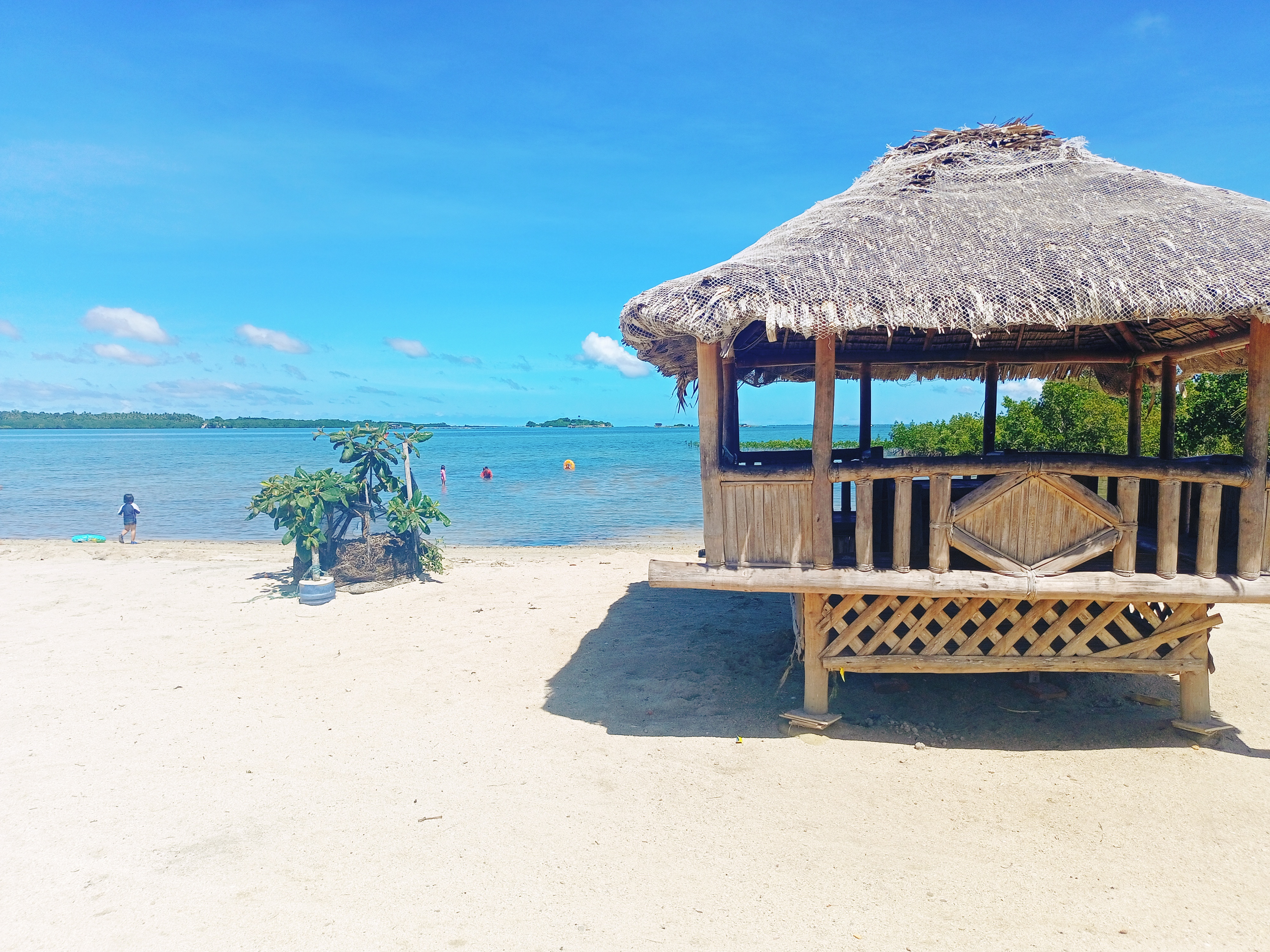
Marino del Norte Resort

Escalante has a total land area of 19,276.303 hectares (47,632.78 acres). It is located on the northeastern tip of Negros Occidental, facing the island of Cebu. It is 49 kilometres (30 mi) from San Carlos City, 95 kilometres (59 mi) from Bacolod, the provincial capital, and 217 kilometres (135 mi) from Dumaguete, the capital of Negros Oriental. It is bounded on the north and west by the city of Sagay, on the south by the town of Toboso and on the east by the Tañon Strait.

Outside the city center of Escalante, there is a separate region of low rolling hills, especially going to its upland barangays towards Mt. Lunay. The hill land section is the remnant of past volcanism and probably, represents either dormant volcanic cinder cones or outliers of a once more extensive volcanic formation. Local residents in the upland barangays of Escalante at the foot of Mt. Lunay testify to period rumblings of a volcano generally believed 'to be dead'. An indicator of the dormant character of Mt. Lunay is the existence to this day of a sulphur spring at its foot. Often, the slopes of these hills as in Barangay Binaguiohan are quite steep. However, the steepness of the slope has not stopped Escalantehanons in cultivation of the hillside.

=== Coastal environment ===
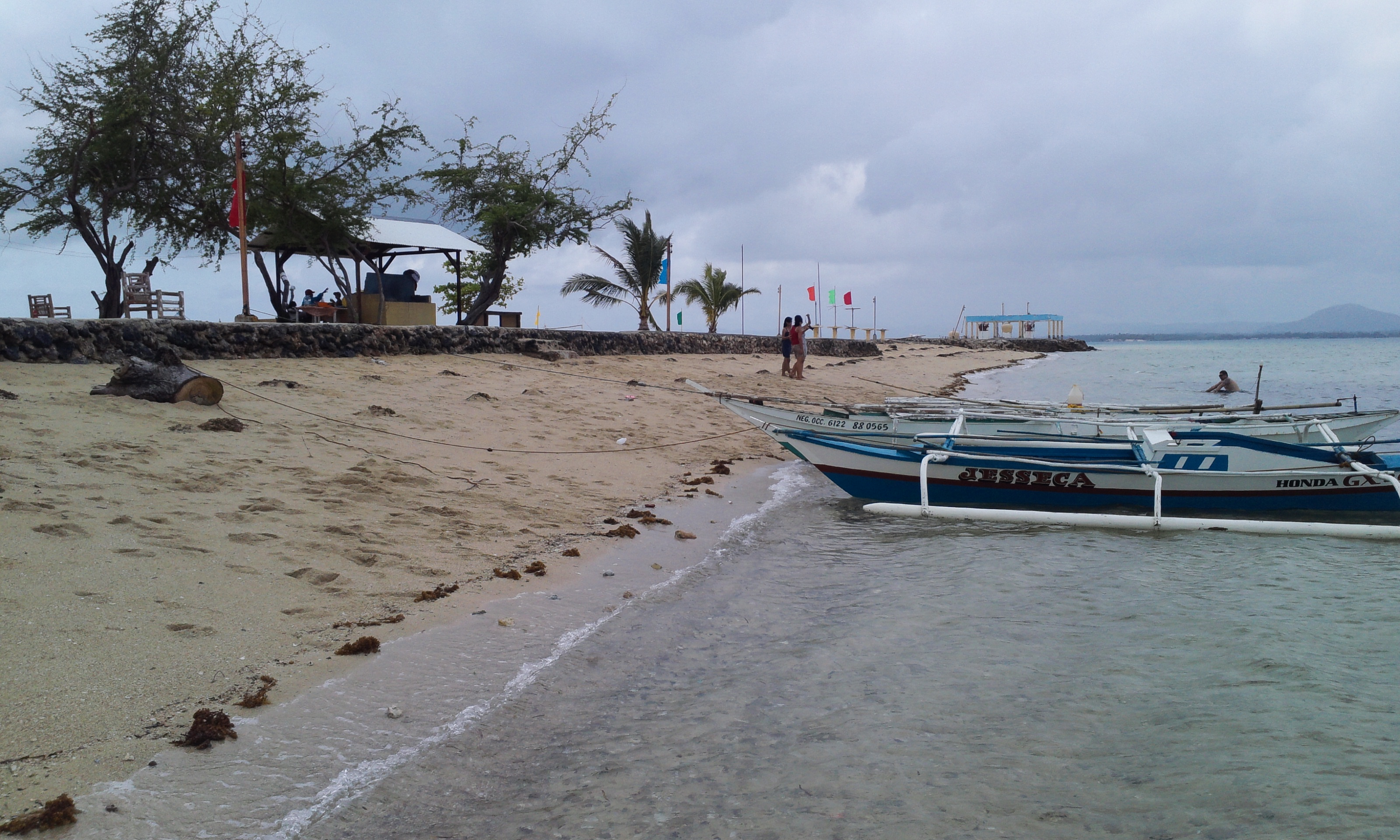

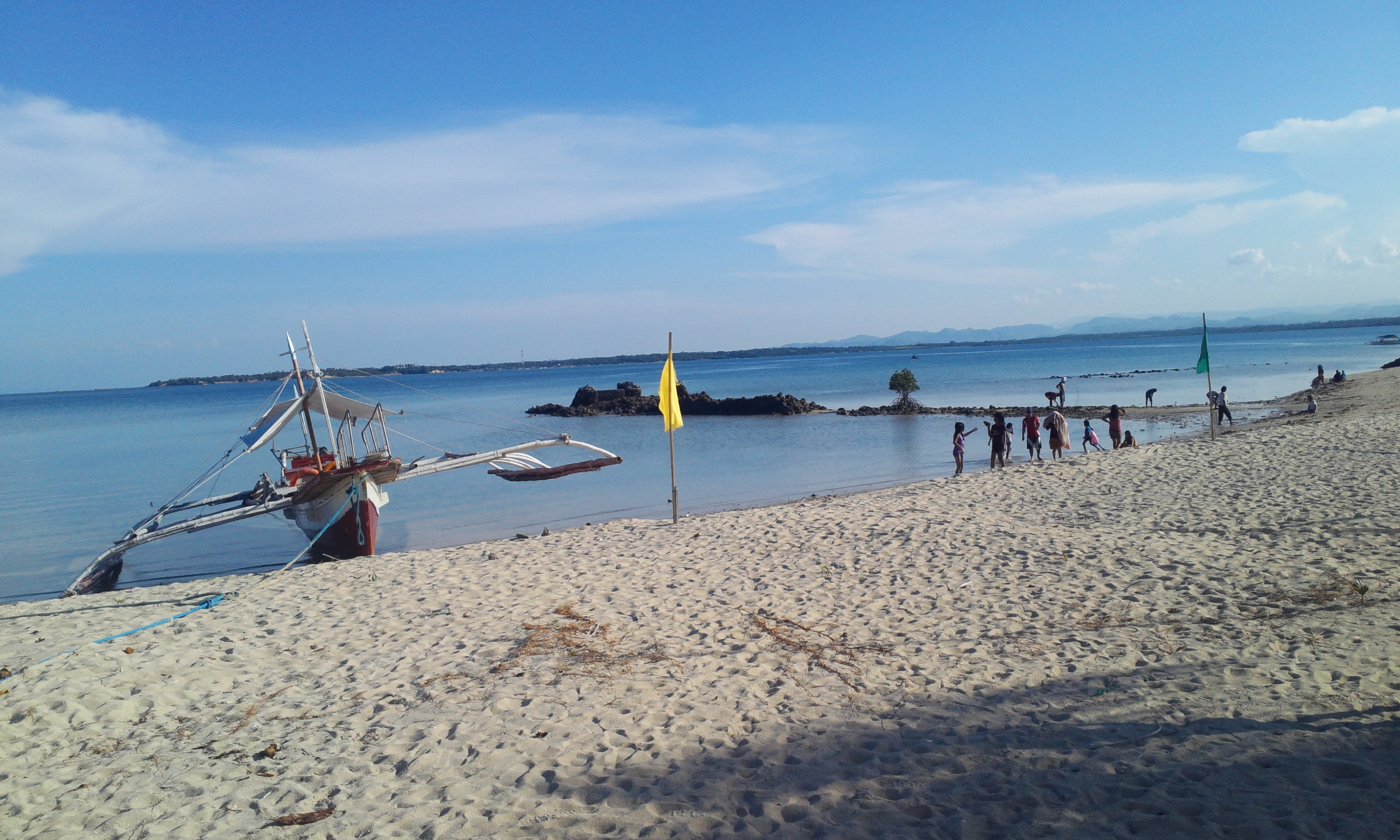
Jomabo Island Paradise and Beach Resort

The diversity of plants in the coastal environment of Escalante is one of the richest in Occidental Negros. Its coasts comprise two surviving ecosystems: the mangrove, consisting of trees and shrubs that occupies the landward portion of its coastal areas; the seagrass, or grasslike plants, that thrive on it shallow nearshore area. In a limited coastal zone, remnants of a third ecosystem, coral reef may be found but in residual, degraded form. The marine waters of Escalante are generally warm throughout the year, except for early mornings of the cool months of December, January and February. Salinity of its waters is within reasonable amount, at 28-36 parts per thousand.

=== Climate ===
Climate data for Escalante, Negros Occidental
Month	Jan	Feb	Mar	Apr	May	Jun	Jul	Aug	Sep	Oct	Nov	Dec	Year
Mean daily maximum °C (°F)	28 (82)	29 (84)	30 (86)	32 (90)	31 (88)	30 (86)	29 (84)	30 (86)	29 (84)	29 (84)	29 (84)	28 (82)	30 (85)
Mean daily minimum °C (°F)	23 (73)	23 (73)	23 (73)	24 (75)	25 (77)	25 (77)	25 (77)	25 (77)	25 (77)	24 (75)	24 (75)	24 (75)	24 (75)
Average precipitation mm (inches)	120 (4.7)	87 (3.4)	95 (3.7)	97 (3.8)	187 (7.4)	263 (10.4)	251 (9.9)	220 (8.7)	227 (8.9)	268 (10.6)	220 (8.7)	158 (6.2)	2,193 (86.4)
Average rainy days	16.1	12.6	15.4	16.8	25.8	28.4	29.1	27.9	27.7	28.5	23.9	18.4	270.6
Source: Meteoblue (modeled/calculated data, not measured locally)

The atmospheric conditions influencing the climate of Escalante as a whole are the same conditions operative in Negros Island. During the summer months (April to December) an air stream is directed from the south. This air current follows a counterclockwise path as it approaches the low-pressure center of the Asian continent, and reaches the Philippines from a southwestern direction as the southwestern monsoon or habagat. During the period from November to January, Negros has relatively cool weather as the Asian continent cools more rapidly than the surrounding seas, resulting in high-pressure centers leading to winds being deflected in a clockwise fashion.

This period is known as the northeastern monsoon or amihan. From March to April the northeastern wind system dominates. The cool season in Escalante is from December through March. It is also the time when low tides called aya-ay prevail, making beachcombing of its shores more pleasurable. The latter part of March through June is when the highest temperatures prevail. But being largely coastal, Escalante enjoys a constant flow of refreshing sea breeze.

=== Barangays ===
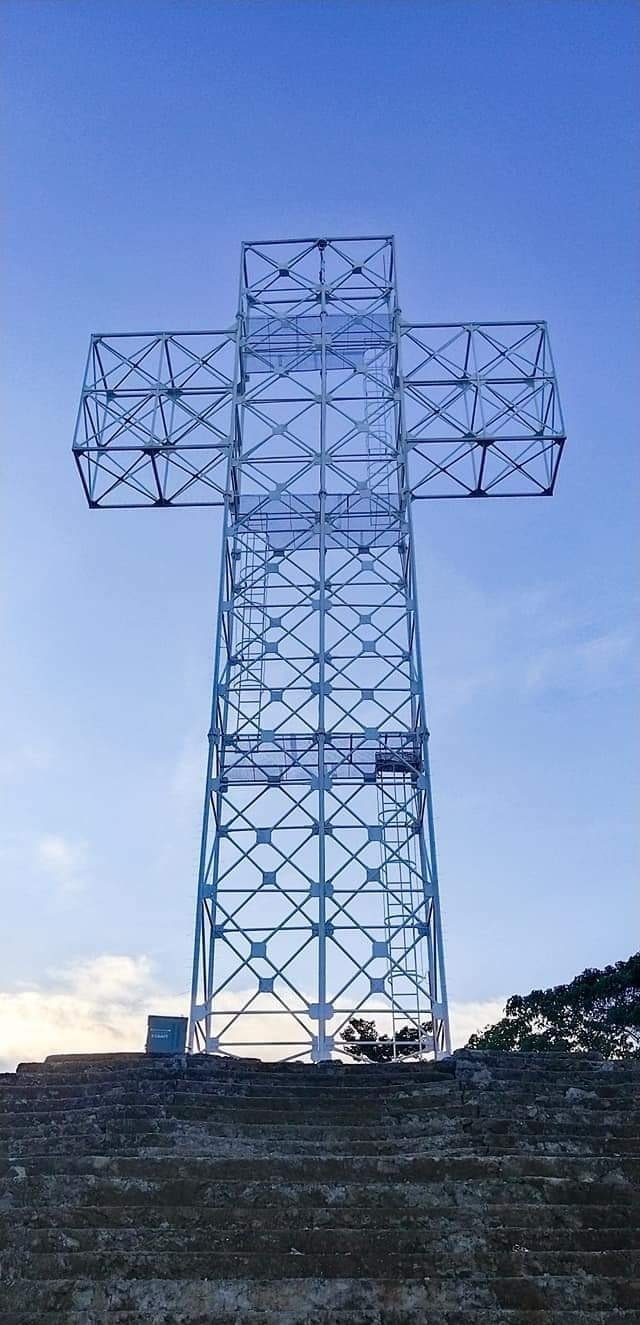
Giant Cross of Mt. Lunay at Barangay Paitan

Escalante is politically subdivided into 21 barangays. Each barangay consists of puroks and some have sitios.

Barangay	Population (2010)	Area (has.)	Distance from city center (km.)
Alimango	5,173	919.4498	3.00
Balintawak (New Escalante)	15,893	720.9231	0.00
Binaguiohan	2,455	726.2457	13.28
Buenavista	3,844	707.7538	16.00
Cervantes	2,668	431.8238	6.62
Dian-ay	4,844	1,750.5637	18.50
Hda. Fe	2,542	552.9899	2.34
Japitan	2,689	586.7144	17.00
Jonobjonob	7,957	1,405.6326	2.08
Langub	3,065	968.2549	13.02
Libertad	2,604	1,839.4097	11.72
Mabini	7,625	1,916.3276	7.60
Magsaysay	1,502	527.0559	14.28
Malasibog	2,850	675.0577	7.34
Old Poblacion	11,304	572.8795	6.24
Paitan	1,638	588.6619	13.72
Pinapugasan	2,824	1,129.2686	15.14
Rizal	2,206	439.3418	14.58
Tamlang	2,417	1,041.3441	9.32
Udtongan	2,174	967.4706	10.18
Washington	5,796	720.2289	5.12
TOTAL	94,070	19,276.3030	

== Demographics ==
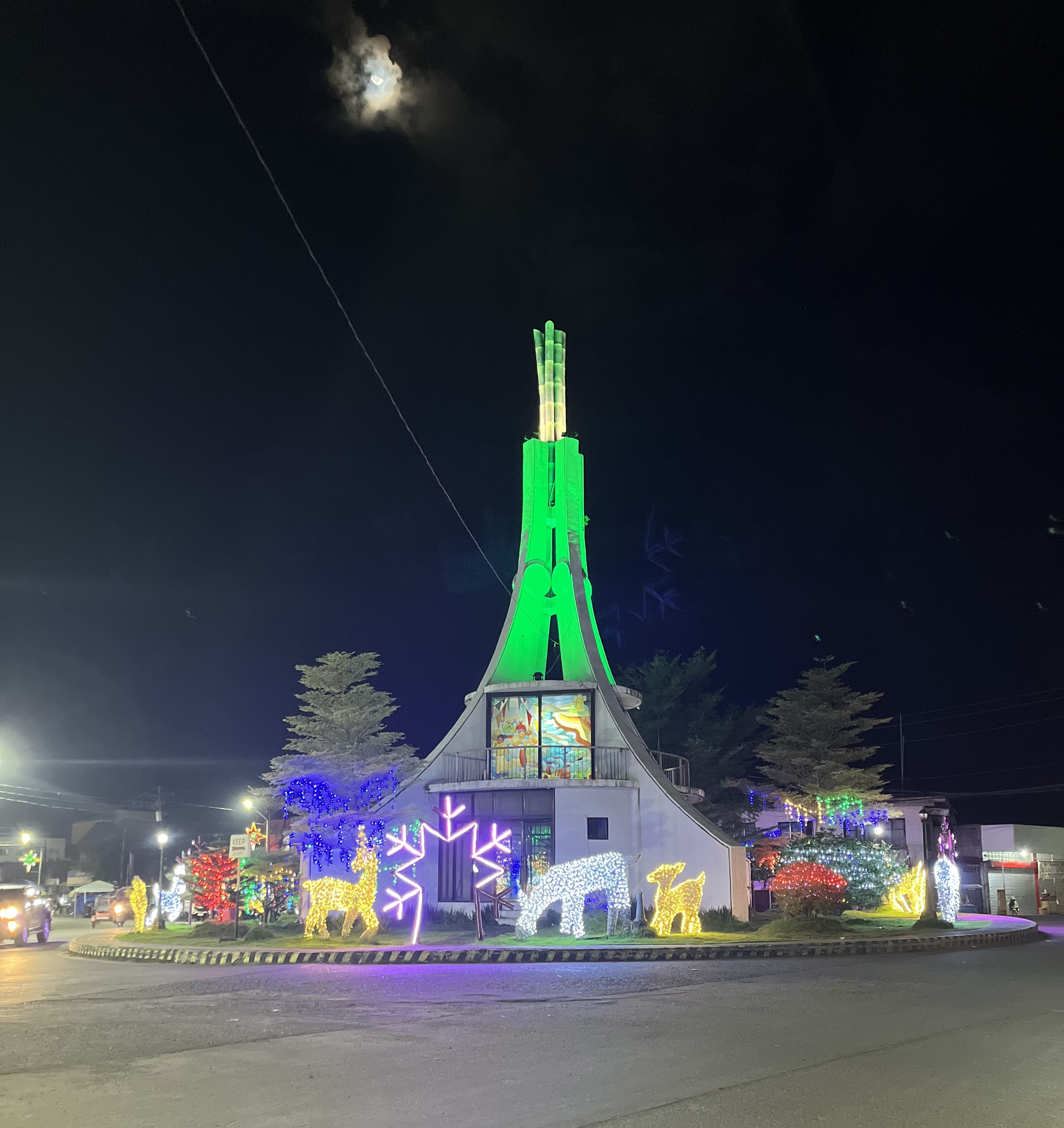
Escalante City Rotonda

Population census of Escalante

Year	Pop.	±% p.a.
1903	12,192	—
1918	29,287	+6.02%
1939	60,152	+3.49%
1948	56,846	−0.63%
1960	59,768	+0.42%
1970	52,060	−1.37%
1975	63,969	+4.22%
1980	71,293	+2.19%

Year	Pop.	±% p.a.
1990	72,685	+0.19%
1995	79,928	+1.80%
2000	79,098	−0.22%
2007	92,035	+2.11%
2010	93,005	+0.38%
2015	94,070	+0.22%
2020	96,159	+0.46%
2024	97,050	+0.22%

Source: Philippine Statistics Authority

The city has grown at a respectably fast rate, averaging 1.63% in the ten years (2000 thru 2010). The May 2010 Census on Population showed that population increased to 93,005 persons. This means that on average that population grew by 1.63% annually since 2000. This is only about 3.20% of the province's population which includes Bacolod City or 3.88% without it. At this rate, the city's population is expected to double by year 2053.

The average household for 2000 was 4.89 persons per household, which is lower than the 5.0 national, 5.1 regional and the 5.24 provincial averages. NSO estimates there were 92,035 persons in 2007 in 18,644 households. This means, the average households size increased to 4.94.

As of December 2009, the average age is 24 years old.

Escalante has the highest population density (persons/square kilometer) in 2007, among the province's cities at 736.3, second only to the provincial capital, Bacolod City. The provincial average is 362.1, while the cities average 417.8.

=== Languages ===
The people in the city speak Cebuano closely followed by Hiligaynon. Tagalog and English are generally understood.

== Economy ==
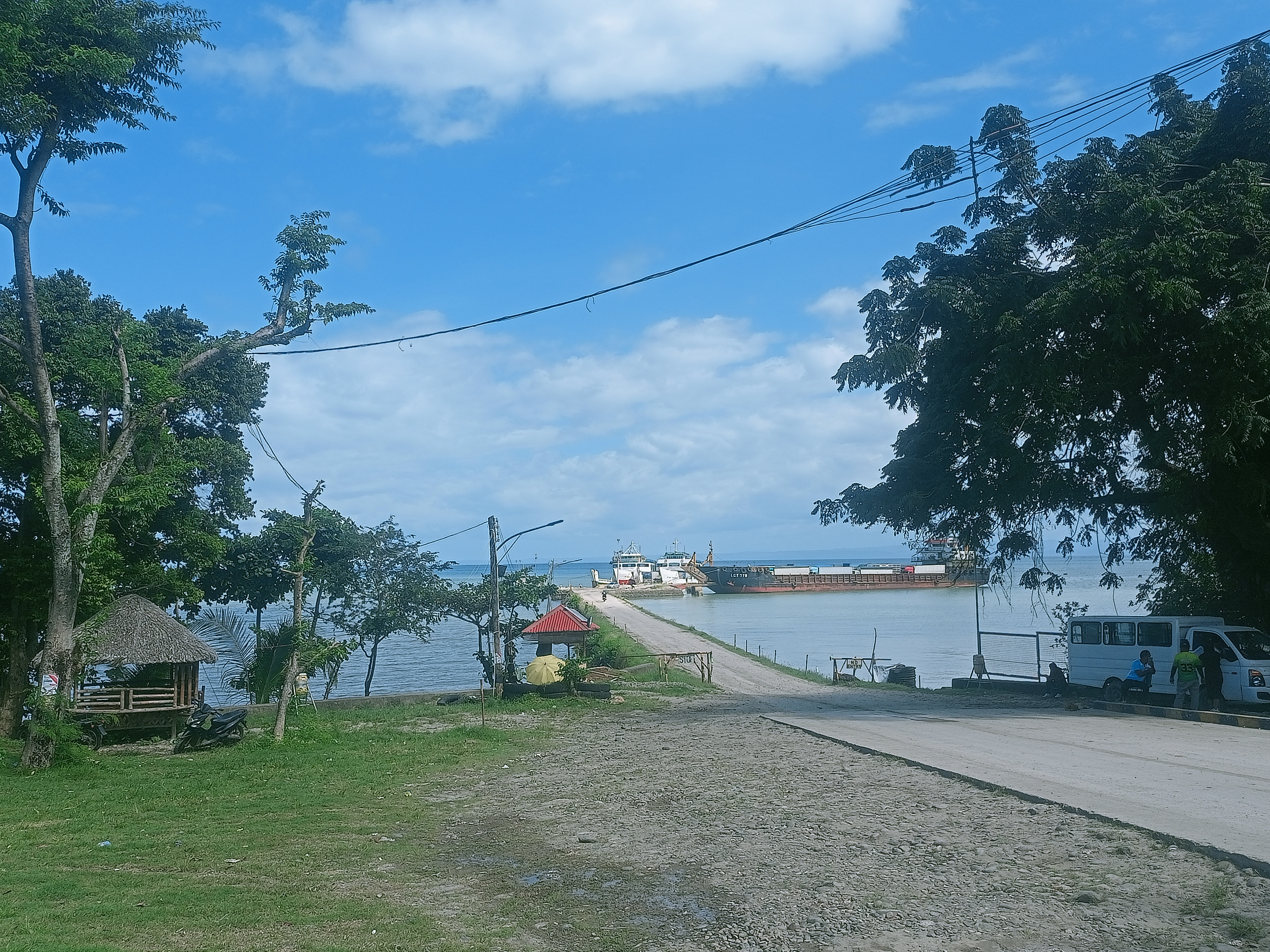
Barcelona Port, the port in Escalante City serving passenger RoRo trips to and from Tabuelan, Cebu.

Poverty incidence of Escalante (%)

Source: Philippine Statistics Authority

== Government ==
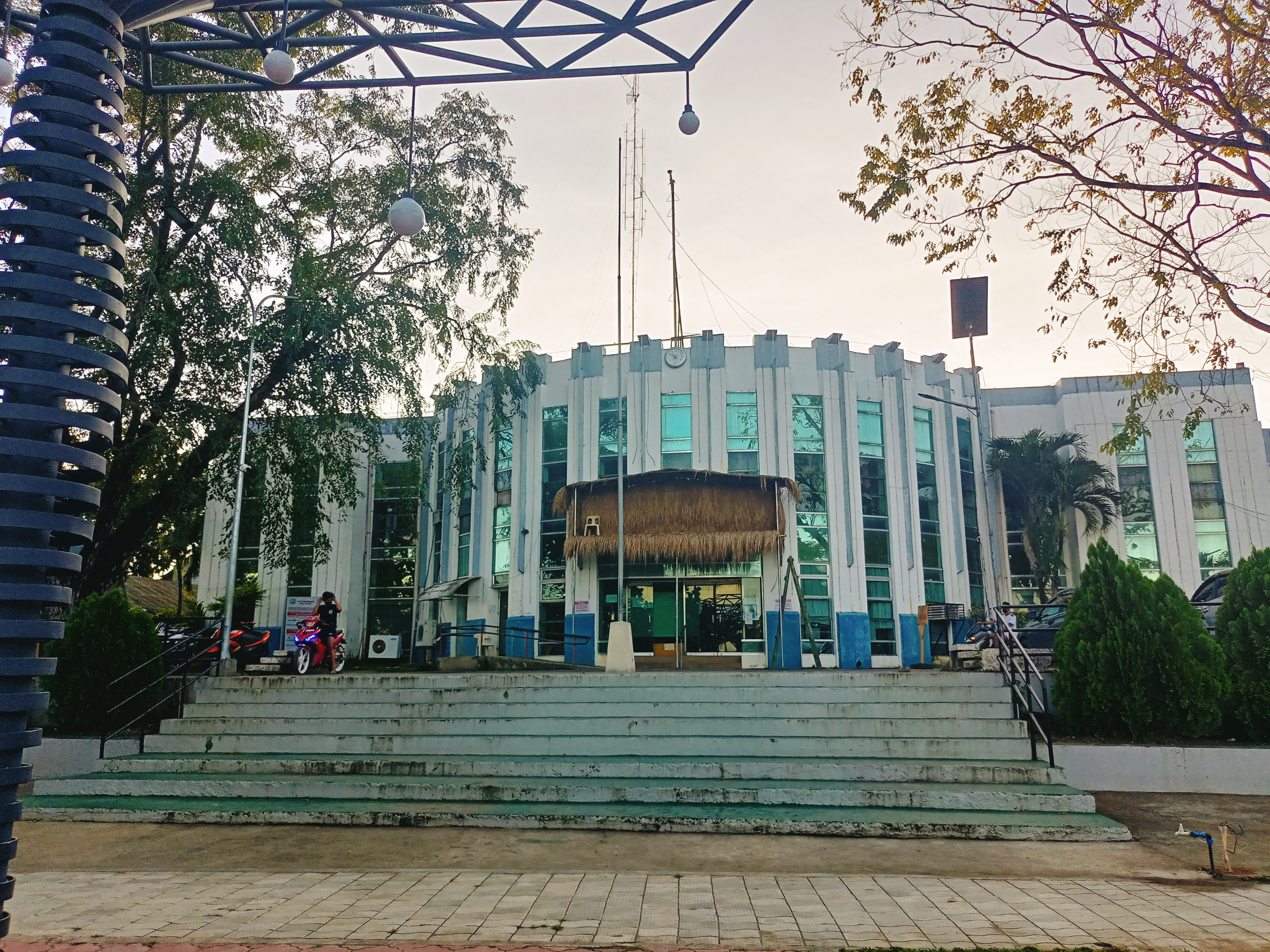
Escalante Old City Hall

Mayors of Escalante
German Carballo, 1901-1904
Juan Infante, 1905-1906
Pelagio Abong, 1906-1907
Vidal Clarin, 1908
Placido Visitacion, 1909-1911
Fernando Lucot, 1912-1918
Gabino Gamao, 1919-1921
Francisco Ferrer, Sr., 1922-1931; 1934-1941
Restituto Dejoras, 1931-1934
Enrique Ballesteros (Japanese-sponsored), 1941-1944
Victor Bedonia (American Resistance), 1941-1948
Pedro Benignos, 1948-1951
Evaristo Sanz, 1952-1955
Amando Tambo, 1956-1957
Braulio P. Lumayno, 1958-1976; Mar. 1980-Jul. 16, 1986
Jose Pete Parreño, Nov. 1976–Mar. 2, 1980
Evelyn L. Hinolan, Jul. 17, 1986–Nov. 30, 1987
Penny Yanong, Dec. 1, 1987–Feb. 2, 1988
Rolando P. Ponsica, Feb. 2, 1988–Mar. 25, 1998
Eme L. Zamora, Mar. 26, 1998–Jun. 30, 1998
Santiago G. Barcelona, Jr., Jul. 1, 1998–Mar. 30, 2001 (pre-cityhood); Mar. 31, 2001-June 30, 2007 (post-cityhood)
Eddie M. Montero, Jul. 1, 2016 – Jun. 30, 2019
Melecio J. Yap, Jr., Jul. 1, 2007–Jun. 30, 2016; Jul. 1, 2019-Present

The local government structure of Escalante is composed of one mayor, one vice mayor, and ten councilors all elected through popular vote. Two ex officio members are added to the City Council with one representing Escalante's 21 Barangay Captains being the Association of Barangay Councils (ABC) President and one representing Escalante's 21 Barangay Youth Council Presidents being the Sangunniang Kabataan (SK) Federation President. Each official, with the exemption of the ABC and SK Presidents, is elected publicly to a 3-year term and can be re-elected up to 3 terms in succession.

Melecio J. Yap, Jr. is the current mayor of the city, while Rogelio A. Prietos is the current vice mayor of the city. The city belongs to the 1st Congressional District of Negros Occidental, which is under the leadership of Congressman Julio "Jules" A. Ledesma IV.

== Education ==
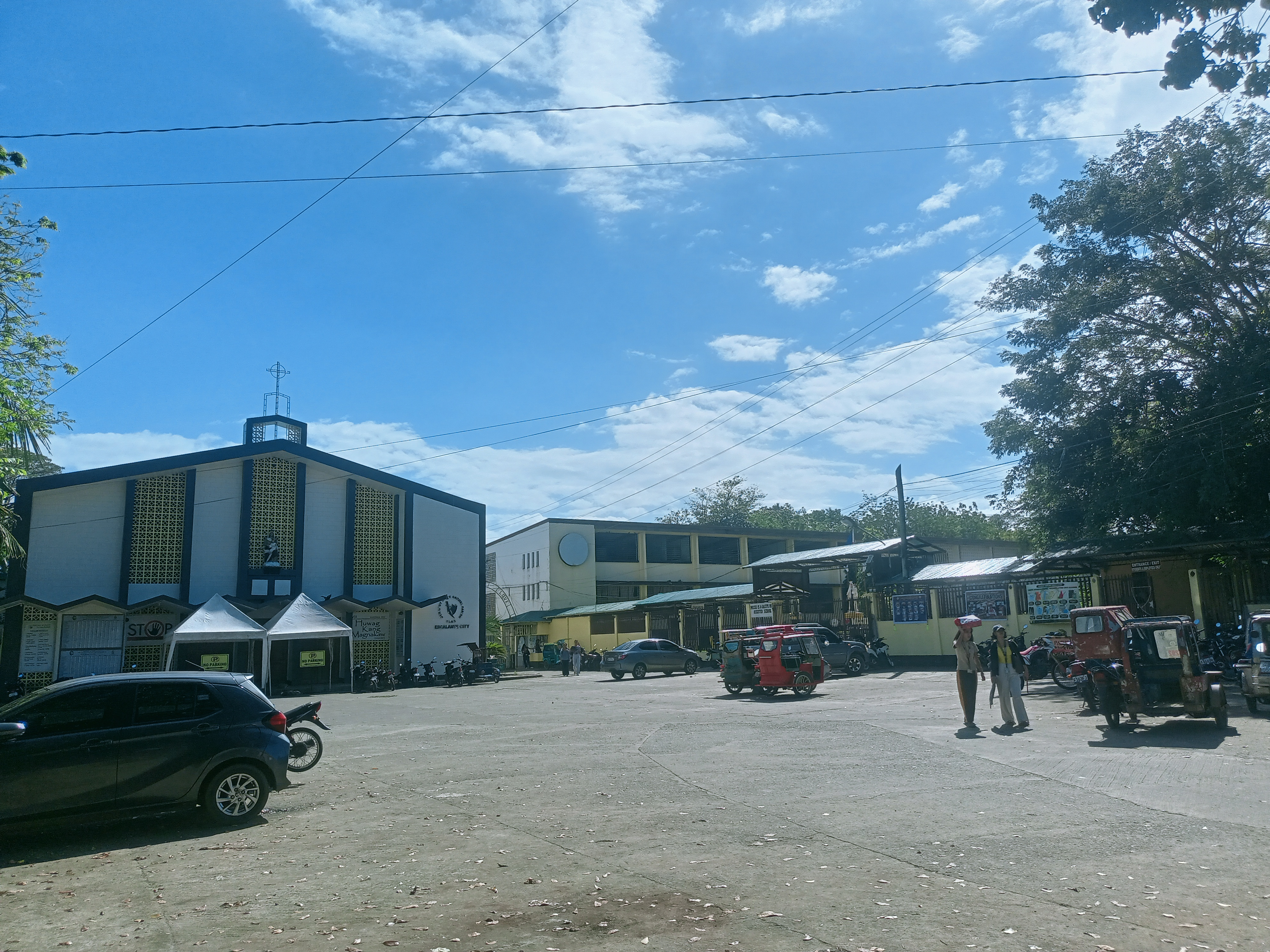
Our Lady of Mount Carmel College Parish (left), standing adjacent to Mount Carmel College of Escalante, Inc. (right)

Notable colleges, and public and private schools

- Mount Carmel College of Escalante Inc.
- State University of Northern Negros – Escalante Campus
- A. Encarguez Technical School
- The Alternative Learning School Inc.
- Bible Baptist Learning Center of Escalante City Inc.
- Maranatha Christian Academy – Escalante Chapter
- Escalante National High School
- Old Poblacion National High School
- Floro T. Bongco Farm School

== Notable personalities ==
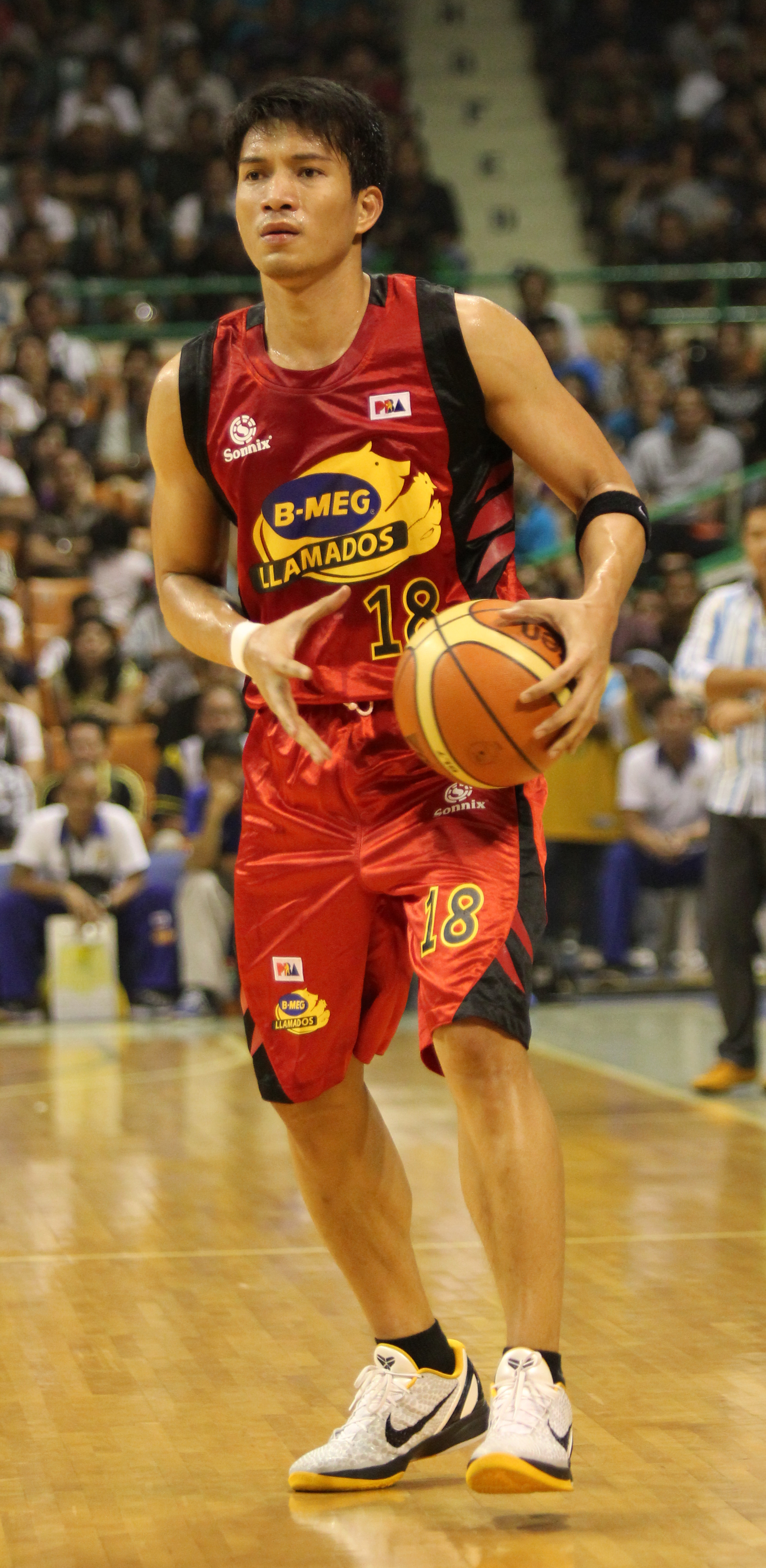
James Yap

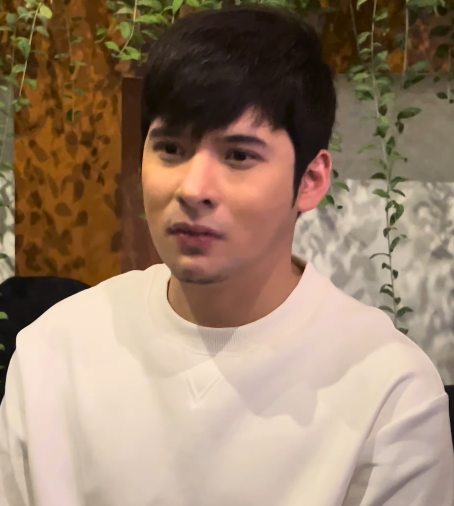
Christian Bables

- Christian Bables (b. 1992) — film and television actor
- Alekhine Nouri (b. 2005) — became the youngest chess FIDE Master in the world at age 7
- James Yap (b. 1982) — professional basketball player, member of the city council of San Juan, Metro Manila
- Jonah Sabete (b.1994) — Professional volleyball player at the Premier Volleyball League
- Stephen Reon Francisco (b. 1986) — Industrial Designer and Ui/Ux, Designed the Escalante City New Public Plaza " Tubo ng Pagkakaisa"
