= Negros Occidental's 1st congressional district =

Legislative district of the Philippines

- Constituency for the House of Representatives of the Philippines
- Boundary of Negros Occidental's 1st congressional district in Negros Occidental
- Location of Negros Occidental within the Philippines
- Province: Negros Occidental
- Region: Negros Island Region
- Population: 381,716 (2020)
- Electorate: 276,286 (2022)
- Major settlements: 5 LGUs: Cities; Escalante; San Carlos; Municipalities; Calatrava; Don Salvador Benedicto; Toboso
- Area: 1,436.59 km^{2} (554.67 sq mi)

Current constituency
- Created: 1907
- Representative: Julio "Jules" A. Ledesma IV
- Political party: NPC
- Congressional bloc: Majority

Negros Occidental's 1st congressional district is one of the six congressional districts of the Philippines in the province of Negros Occidental. It has been represented in the House of Representatives of the Philippines since 1916 and earlier in the Philippine Assembly from 1907 to 1916. The district consists of the northern Negros Occidental cities of Escalante and San Carlos, as well as adjacent municipalities of Calatrava, Don Salvador Benedicto and Toboso. It is currently represented in the 20th Congress by Julio A. Ledesma IV of the Nationalist People's Coalition (NPC).

== Representation history ==
#	Image	Member	Term of office		Legislature	Party	Electoral history	Constituent LGUs
#	Image	Member	Start	End	Legislature	Party	Electoral history	Constituent LGUs
=== Negros Occidental's 1st district for the Philippine Assembly ===
District created January 9, 1907.
1		Antonio Ledesma Jayme	October 16, 1907	March 13, 1909	1st	Nacionalista	Elected in 1907.	1907–1916; Cadiz, Escalante, Manapla, Sagay, San Carlos, Saravia, Silay, Victorias
2		José López Villanueva	October 16, 1909	October 16, 1912	2nd	Nacionalista	Elected in 1909.	1907–1916; Cadiz, Escalante, Manapla, Sagay, San Carlos, Saravia, Silay, Victorias
3		Melecio Severino	October 16, 1912	May 16, 1915	3rd	Nacionalista	Elected in 1912. Died.	1907–1916; Cadiz, Escalante, Manapla, Sagay, San Carlos, Saravia, Silay, Victorias
=== Negros Occidental's 1st district for the House of Representatives of the Philippine Islands ===
4		Lope P. Severino	October 16, 1916	June 6, 1922	4th	Nacionalista	Elected in 1916.	1916–1925; Cadiz, Escalante, Manapla, Sagay, San Carlos, Saravia, Silay, Victorias
4		Lope P. Severino	October 16, 1916	June 6, 1922	5th	Nacionalista	Re-elected in 1919.	1916–1925; Cadiz, Escalante, Manapla, Sagay, San Carlos, Saravia, Silay, Victorias
5		Serafín P. Hilado	June 6, 1922	June 5, 1928	6th	Nacionalista; Unipersonalista	Elected in 1922.	1916–1925; Cadiz, Escalante, Manapla, Sagay, San Carlos, Saravia, Silay, Victorias
5		Serafín P. Hilado	June 6, 1922	June 5, 1928	7th	Nacionalista; Consolidado	Re-elected in 1925.	1925–1935; Cadiz, Calatrava, Escalante, Manapla, Sagay, San Carlos, Saravia, Silay, Victorias
6		José Locsin	June 5, 1928	June 2, 1931	8th	Nacionalista; Consolidado	Elected in 1928.	1925–1935; Cadiz, Calatrava, Escalante, Manapla, Sagay, San Carlos, Saravia, Silay, Victorias
7		Enrique Magalona	June 2, 1931	September 16, 1935	9th	Nacionalista; Consolidado	Elected in 1931.	1925–1935; Cadiz, Calatrava, Escalante, Manapla, Sagay, San Carlos, Saravia, Silay, Victorias
7		Enrique Magalona	June 2, 1931	September 16, 1935	10th	Nacionalista; Democrático	Re-elected in 1934.	1925–1935; Cadiz, Calatrava, Escalante, Manapla, Sagay, San Carlos, Saravia, Silay, Victorias
#	Image	Member	Term of office		National Assembly	Party	Electoral history	Constituent LGUs
#	Image	Member	Start	End	National Assembly	Party	Electoral history	Constituent LGUs
=== Negros Occidental's 1st district for the National Assembly (Commonwealth of the Philippines) ===
(7)		Enrique Magalona	September 16, 1935	December 30, 1941	1st	Nacionalista; Democrático	Re-elected in 1935.	1935–1941; Cadiz, Calatrava, Escalante, Manapla, Sagay, San Carlos, Saravia, Silay, Victorias
(7)		Enrique Magalona	September 16, 1935	December 30, 1941	2nd	Nacionalista	Re-elected in 1938.	1935–1941; Cadiz, Calatrava, Escalante, Manapla, Sagay, San Carlos, Saravia, Silay, Victorias
District dissolved into the two-seat Negros Occidental's at-large district for the National Assembly (Second Philippine Republic).
#	Image	Member	Term of office		Common wealth Congress	Party	Electoral history	Constituent LGUs
#	Image	Member	Start	End	Common wealth Congress	Party	Electoral history	Constituent LGUs
=== Negros Occidental's 1st district for the House of Representatives of the Commonwealth of the Philippines ===
District re-created May 24, 1945.
(7)		Enrique Magalona	June 11, 1945	May 25, 1946	1st	Nacionalista	Re-elected in 1941.	1945–1946; Cadiz, Calatrava, Escalante, Manapla, Sagay, San Carlos, Saravia, Silay, Victorias
#	Image	Member	Term of office		Congress	Party	Electoral history	Constituent LGUs
#	Image	Member	Start	End	Congress	Party	Electoral history	Constituent LGUs
=== Negros Occidental's 1st district for the House of Representatives of the Philippines ===
8		Vicente F. Gustilo Sr.	May 25, 1946	December 30, 1949	1st	Nacionalista	Elected in 1946.	1946–1949; Cadiz, Calatrava, Escalante, Manapla, Sagay, San Carlos, Saravia, Silay, Victorias
9		Francisco Ferrer	December 30, 1949	December 30, 1953	2nd	Liberal	Elected in 1949.	1949–1969; Cadiz, Calatrava, Escalante, Manapla, Sagay, San Carlos, Saravia, Silay, Toboso, Victorias
10		José B. Puey	December 30, 1953	December 30, 1957	3rd	Democratic	Elected in 1953.	1949–1969; Cadiz, Calatrava, Escalante, Manapla, Sagay, San Carlos, Saravia, Silay, Toboso, Victorias
(8)		Vicente F. Gustilo Sr.	December 30, 1957	December 17, 1962	4th	Nacionalista	Elected in 1957.	1949–1969; Cadiz, Calatrava, Escalante, Manapla, Sagay, San Carlos, Saravia, Silay, Toboso, Victorias
(8)		Vicente F. Gustilo Sr.	December 30, 1957	December 17, 1962	5th	Nacionalista	Re-elected in 1961. Died.	1949–1969; Cadiz, Calatrava, Escalante, Manapla, Sagay, San Carlos, Saravia, Silay, Toboso, Victorias
11		Armando C. Gustilo	January 27, 1964	September 23, 1972	5th	Nacionalista	Elected in 1963 to finish his father's term.	1949–1969; Cadiz, Calatrava, Escalante, Manapla, Sagay, San Carlos, Saravia, Silay, Toboso, Victorias
11		Armando C. Gustilo	January 27, 1964	September 23, 1972	6th	Nacionalista	Re-elected in 1965.	1949–1969; Cadiz, Calatrava, Escalante, Manapla, Sagay, San Carlos, Saravia, Silay, Toboso, Victorias
11		Armando C. Gustilo	January 27, 1964	September 23, 1972	7th	Nacionalista	Re-elected in 1969. Removed from office after imposition of martial law.	1969–1972; Cadiz, Calatrava, Enrique B. Magalona, Escalante, Manapla, Sagay, San Carlos, Silay, Toboso, Victorias
District dissolved into the sixteen-seat Region VI's at-large district for the Interim Batasang Pambansa, followed by the seven-seat Negros Occidental's at-large district for the Regular Batasang Pambansa.
District re-created February 2, 1987.
12		Salvador S. Laguda	June 30, 1987	June 30, 1992	8th	Lakas ng Bansa	Elected in 1987.	1987–present Calatrava, Escalante, Don Salvador Benedicto, San Carlos, Toboso
13		Tranquilino B. Carmona	June 30, 1992	June 30, 1995	9th	NPC	Elected in 1992.	1987–present Calatrava, Escalante, Don Salvador Benedicto, San Carlos, Toboso
14		Julio A. Ledesma IV	June 30, 1995	June 30, 2004	10th	Lakas	Elected in 1995.	1987–present Calatrava, Escalante, Don Salvador Benedicto, San Carlos, Toboso
14		Julio A. Ledesma IV	June 30, 1995	June 30, 2004	11th	Lakas	Re-elected in 1998.	1987–present Calatrava, Escalante, Don Salvador Benedicto, San Carlos, Toboso
14		Julio A. Ledesma IV	June 30, 1995	June 30, 2004	12th	UNEGA	Re-elected in 2001.	1987–present Calatrava, Escalante, Don Salvador Benedicto, San Carlos, Toboso
(13)		Tranquilino B. Carmona	June 30, 2004	June 30, 2007	13th	Lakas	Re-elected in 2004.	1987–present Calatrava, Escalante, Don Salvador Benedicto, San Carlos, Toboso
(14)		Julio A. Ledesma IV	June 30, 2007	June 30, 2016	14th	NPC	Elected in 2007.	1987–present Calatrava, Escalante, Don Salvador Benedicto, San Carlos, Toboso
(14)		Julio A. Ledesma IV	June 30, 2007	June 30, 2016	15th	NPC	Re-elected in 2010.	1987–present Calatrava, Escalante, Don Salvador Benedicto, San Carlos, Toboso
(14)		Julio A. Ledesma IV	June 30, 2007	June 30, 2016	16th	NPC	Re-elected in 2013.	1987–present Calatrava, Escalante, Don Salvador Benedicto, San Carlos, Toboso
15		Melecio J. Yap Jr.	June 30, 2016	June 30, 2019	17th	NPC	Elected in 2016.	1987–present Calatrava, Escalante, Don Salvador Benedicto, San Carlos, Toboso
16		Gerardo P. Valmayor Jr.	June 30, 2019	June 30, 2025	18th	NPC	Elected in 2019.	1987–present Calatrava, Escalante, Don Salvador Benedicto, San Carlos, Toboso
16		Gerardo P. Valmayor Jr.	June 30, 2019	June 30, 2025	19th	NPC	Re-elected in 2022.	1987–present Calatrava, Escalante, Don Salvador Benedicto, San Carlos, Toboso
(14)		Julio A. Ledesma IV	June 30, 2025	Incumbent	20th	NPC	Elected in 2025.	1987–present Calatrava, Escalante, Don Salvador Benedicto, San Carlos, Toboso

== Election results ==
=== 2025 ===
2025 Philippine House of Representatives election in the First District of Negros Occidental
Candidate	Party	Votes	%
Jules Ledesma	Nationalist People's Coalition	157,328	95.27
Erie Mahinay	Partido Lakas ng Masa	7,819	4.73
Total		165,147	100.00
Nationalist People's Coalition hold			
Source: Commission on Elections

=== 2022 ===
2022 Philippine House of Representatives elections
Party	Candidate	Votes	%
NPC	Gerardo "Ginggo" Valmayor Jr.	123,050	100.00%
Total votes		123,050	100.00%
NPC hold			

=== 2019 ===
2019 Philippine House of Representatives elections
Party	Candidate	Votes	%
NPC	Gerardo "Ginggo" Valmayor Jr.	106,916	
Independent	Toto Librando	7,356	
PDDS	Romulo Giuon	5,555	
Total votes			100.00%
NPC hold			

=== 2016 ===
2016 Philippine House of Representatives elections
Party	Candidate	Votes	%
NPC	Melecio Yap Jr.	93,695	66.27%
Liberal	Santiago Maravillas	44,298	31.33%
KBL	Ernesto Librando	3,388	2.39%
Invalid or blank votes		43,928	
Total votes		185,309	100.00%
NPC hold			

=== 2013 ===
2013 Philippine House of Representatives elections
Party	Candidate	Votes	%
NPC	Julio "Jules" Ledesma IV	76,727	52.57
PMP	Nehemias Dela Cruz Sr.	47,922	32.83
Aksyon	Ernesto Librando	486	0.33
Independent	Leopoldo Sua	114	0.08
Margin of victory		28,805	19.73%
Invalid or blank votes		20,710	14.19
Total votes		145,959	100.00
NPC hold			

=== 2010 ===
2010 Philippine House of Representatives elections
Party	Candidate	Votes	%
NPC	Julio Ledesma IV	123,970	94.01
Independent	Ernesto Librando	7,904	5.99
Valid ballots		131,874	83.79
Invalid or blank votes		25,514	16.21
Total votes		157,388	100.00
NPC hold			

== See also ==
- Legislative districts of Negros Occidental
