= Toboso, Negros Occidental =

Municipality in Negros Occidental, Philippines

Toboso
- Municipality
- Municipality of Toboso
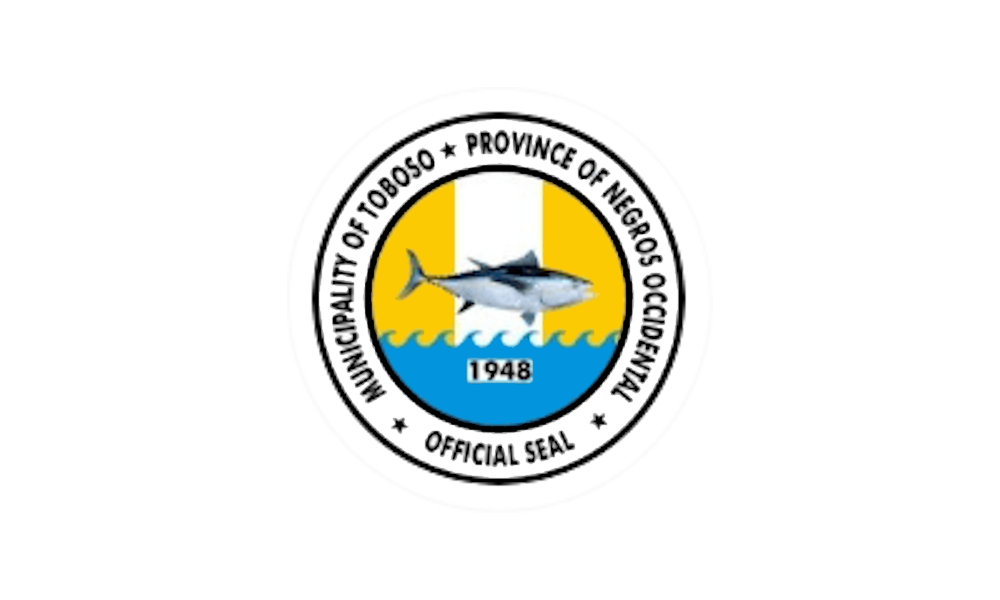
- Flag Seal
- Motto: Asenso pa, Toboso!
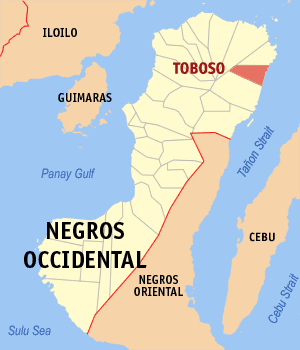
- Map of Negros Occidental with Toboso highlighted
- Interactive map of Toboso
- Location within the Philippines
- Coordinates: 10°43′N 123°31′E
- Country: Philippines
- Region: Negros Island Region
- Province: Negros Occidental
- District: 1st district
- Named for: El Toboso, Spain
- Barangays: 9 (see Barangays)

Government
  - Type: Sangguniang Bayan
  - Mayor: Richard M. Jaojoco (Lakas)
  - Vice Mayor: Maria Luisa B. de la Cruz (Lakas)
  - Representative: Julio A. Ledesma IV (NPC)
  - Municipal Council: Members: John Paul B. De la Cruz; Jonel R. Rosa-ot; Martin John S. Ballesteros; Efren A. Mandajoyan; Jesil Marie C. Bedonia; Ma. Bernadette M. Bartolome; Adriano V. Pañares, Jr.; Romeo S. Leyte
  - Electorate: 32,623 voters (2025)

Area
  - Total: 117.33 km^{2} (45.30 sq mi)
- Elevation: 110 m (360 ft)
- Highest elevation: 928 m (3,045 ft)
- Lowest elevation: −1 m (−3.3 ft)

Population (2024 census)
  - Total: 44,973
  - Density: 383.30/km^{2} (992.75/sq mi)
  - Households: 10,968

Economy
  - Income class: 2nd municipal income class
  - Poverty incidence: 31.26% (2023)
  - Revenue: ₱ 187 million (2023, 2024)
  - Assets: ₱ 847.9 million (2024)
  - Expenditure: ₱ 173 million (2023, 2024)
  - Liabilities: ₱ 168.4 million (2024)

Service provider
  - Electricity: Northern Negros Electric Cooperative (NONECO)
- Time zone: UTC+8 (PST)
- ZIP code: 6125
- PSGC: 064529000
- IDD : area code: +63 (0)34
- Native languages: Hiligaynon; Tagalog; Cebuano
- Website: municipalityoftoboso.com

Toboso, officially the Municipality of Toboso (Cebuano: Lungsod sa Toboso; Hiligaynon: Banwa sang Toboso; Tagalog: Bayan ng Toboso), is a municipality in the province of Negros Occidental, Philippines. In the 2024 census, it had a population of 44,973 people.

== History ==
The site of what would become Toboso dated back to the precolonial period. The center of the original settlement was first known as Sag-ahan, an archaic word which means in the Cebuano language "to take out or catch fish by the hands" because fish were abundant in the coast and rivers, and eventually lent its name to the contemporary barangay Sagahan.

Upon Spanish colonization, the community was named Toboso in honor of a similar settlement in Spain, El Toboso, famous for appearing in the novel Don Quixote by the Spanish writer Miguel de Cervantes, as the town in which the fictional character Dulcinea del Toboso lives. Toboso was then a barrio of Escalante. Like many other settlements on the eastern coast of Negros, the community of Toboso had expanded with the coming of immigrants from the island of Cebu and developed extensively in fishing, agriculture and commerce.

During early period of American colonization of the Philippines, more impetus was dedicated to a sugarcane mill called the Central Azucarera del Danao at Labilabi, 6 kilometers from Toboso. The development of the sugar industry was started and gave livelihood to members of the community of Toboso.

After Philippine Independence, Toboso continued to thrive as a part of Escalante until Executive Order No. 141 was signed by president Elpidio Quirino separating the town as an independent municipality from Escalante.

== Geography ==
Toboso is on the northeastern side of the province of Negros Occidental and faces the island of Cebu. It is bounded on the southwest by the municipality of Calatrava; northwest by the city of Sagay; north by the city of Escalante and east by Tañon Strait. The shoreline runs along the Tañon Strait from Calatrava boundary to the Escalante boundary facing east.

Toboso is 114 kilometres (71 mi) from Bacolod and 198 kilometres (123 mi) from Dumaguete, the capital of Negros Oriental.

=== Barangays ===
Toboso is politically subdivided into 9 barangays. Each barangay consists of puroks and some have sitios.

- Bandilla
- Bug-ang
- General Luna
- Magticol
- Poblacion
- Salamanca
- San Isidro
- San Jose
- Tabun-ac

=== Climate ===
Climate data for Toboso, Negros Occidental
Month	Jan	Feb	Mar	Apr	May	Jun	Jul	Aug	Sep	Oct	Nov	Dec	Year
Mean daily maximum °C (°F)	28 (82)	29 (84)	30 (86)	32 (90)	31 (88)	30 (86)	29 (84)	30 (86)	29 (84)	29 (84)	29 (84)	28 (82)	30 (85)
Mean daily minimum °C (°F)	23 (73)	23 (73)	23 (73)	24 (75)	25 (77)	25 (77)	25 (77)	25 (77)	25 (77)	24 (75)	24 (75)	24 (75)	24 (75)
Average precipitation mm (inches)	120 (4.7)	87 (3.4)	95 (3.7)	97 (3.8)	187 (7.4)	263 (10.4)	251 (9.9)	220 (8.7)	227 (8.9)	268 (10.6)	220 (8.7)	158 (6.2)	2,193 (86.4)
Average rainy days	16.1	12.6	15.4	16.8	25.8	28.4	29.1	27.9	27.7	28.5	23.9	18.4	270.6
Source: Meteoblue

== Demographics ==
Population census of Toboso
Year	Pop.	±% p.a.
1948	29,278	—
1960	36,378	+1.83%
1970	28,358	−2.46%
1975	35,737	+4.75%
1980	36,415	+0.38%
1990	34,621	−0.50%
1995	38,623	+2.07%
2000	40,712	+1.14%
2007	41,358	+0.22%
2010	41,658	+0.26%
2015	42,114	+0.21%
2020	43,445	+0.66%
2024	44,973	+0.83%
Source: Philippine Statistics Authority

=== Language ===
The inhabitants speak Cebuano (95.34%), followed by Hiligaynon (4.27%). Tagalog and English are widely used in schools, businesses, and government offices.

== Economy ==
Poverty incidence of Toboso (%)

Source: Philippine Statistics Authority

Economic progress in Toboso has been sluggish due to the limited number of business establishments. It is commonly tagged as "one of the municipalities with high number of poverty incidence in Negros Occidental". Since its municipality recognition in July 1948, the town struggled to be at par with its neighboring cities like Escalante, Sagay, San Carlos and the town of Calatrava.

The economy primarily depends on sugarcane production. In 2019, there were 4,746 hectares under plantation, which produced 237,300 metric tons of sugarcane. In 2019, coconut production harvested 4,100 metric tons. Corn, livestock raising, poultry, game fowl and fishing are major contributors to local economy. Inhabitants often find work in neighboring provinces, engaging in shipbuilding. Others work as Overseas Filipino Workers, others engage in handicraft business. Some choose food preparation and form of local, small businesses.

== Tourism ==
The Mainit Hot Springs are located in the area of Barangay San Isidro, 12 km (7.5 mi) from the town center. Kampanoy Cave, located on the territory of Barangay General Luna, has a spacious interior which resembles a dome cathedral, next to the coast and is inhabited by Edible-nest swiftlet (Aerodramus fuciphagus) which in recent years has been damaged because of phosphate mining.

Trangkalan Cave is located in Brgy. Magticol, until recently it was used for native folk religious acts. The magnificent 250 meter high cascades of the Dalisun Waterfalls are located near Sitio Vergara, Brgy. Bug-ang. Offshore Toboso is the 200-acre/80 hectare Kevin's Reef, a 10-minute boat ride away.

== Notable personalities ==
- Merlito Sabillo — WBO Minimumweight world champion
