= Alekhine Nouri =

Filipino chess player (born 2005)

Personal information
- Born: December 12, 2005 (age 20) Escalante, Negros Occidental, Philippines

Chess career
- Country: Philippines
- Title: FIDE Master (2013)
- Peak rating: 2291 (April 2020)

Alekhine Nouri (born December 12, 2005) is a Filipino FIDE Master. Named after Russian chess player Alexander Alekhine, Nouri became the youngest Filipino FIDE Master and the youngest FIDE Master in the world at the age of 7. He is also the current Philippine Juniors Chess Champion.

== Biography ==
Alekhine Nouri was born in Negros, Philippines, on December 12, 2005, to parents Hamed and Rhoda. He began playing competitive chess at the age of five. His father Hamed, an International Master himself, would bring him along to a local chess club in Escalante, Negros. Realizing his potential, his father quit his job and acted as his coach to give his son's chess career his full attention. They started practicing regularly, with the father keeping him away from such distractions as television and computer games. In December 2012, Nouri's family decided to move from Negros to Taguig to further develop his potential. He was granted an athletic scholarship by Far Eastern University, as a member of the school's elementary chess team. He has since transferred to the University of Santo Tomas.

== Chess career ==
=== 14th ASEAN Age Group Chess Championships 2013 ===
In June 2013, during the 14th ASEAN Age Group Chess Championships 2013 in Thailand, Nouri claimed an outright FM title with his victory in the Open 8-under category, thus making him as the youngest Filipino FIDE Master and the then youngest FIDE Master in the world.

=== USM 24th Chess Individual Open 2018 ===
In March 2018, Nouri finished with seven points and won via tiebreaker to bag the champion's trophy of USM 24th Chess Individual Open tournament in Penang, Malaysia.

=== 19th ASEAN Age Group Chess Championships 2018 ===
In June 2018, Nouri won the gold in the under-16 blitz though he faltered in the standard and rapid category.

=== Malaysian Chess Festival 2019 ===
In August 2019, Nouri fell one game short of winning the championship, losing to tournament champion Russian IM Zhamsaran Tsydypov in the ninth round and slipped to fifth place in the blitz tournament held in Kuala Lumpur, Malaysia.

=== Philippine national squad roster selection 2020 ===
In February 2020, the Philippine Sports Commission-National Chess Federation of the Philippines organized a players selection process for the Chess Olympiad via holding a tournament. Nouri, together with IM Jan Emmanuel Garcia, racked up seven points but Nouri ended up winning the men's division by tiebreak during the first round of the qualification tournament held in PACE headquarters, Quezon City.

=== 2021 Philippine National Juniors Chess Championship ===
Along with WNM Mhage Gerriahlou Sebastian, he won the National Juniors Championship held over-the-board on December 7, 2021, in Quezon City.

=== 2025 Asian Juniors Rapid Championships ===
Alekhine Nouri secured the title at the Asian Junior Rapid Chess Championship in 2025, finishing first with a score of 6.5/9, ahead of India's Jaiveer Mahendru and the Philippines’ Jerish John Velarde
