= 2013 Philippine House of Representatives elections in Western Visayas =

Elections were held in Western Visayas for seats in the House of Representatives of the Philippines on May 13, 2013.

The candidate with the most votes will win that district's seat for the 16th Congress of the Philippines.

== Summary ==
Party	Popular vote	%	Swing	Seats won	Change
Liberal				10	
NPC				3	
NUP				2	
UNA				1	
UNegA				1	
Aksyon				0	
Lakas				0	
Nacionalista				0	
PDP–Laban				0	
LM				0	
PMP				0	
Independent				1	
Valid votes				18	
Invalid votes					
Turnout					
Registered voters					

== Aklan ==
Incumbent Florencio Miraflores is term limited and running for the governorship. His cousin, Kasangga party-list representative Teodorico Haresco is his party's nominee but he is running as an independent.

2013 Philippine House of Representatives election at Aklan
Party	Candidate	Votes	%
Independent	Nonong Haresco	85,237	39.13
UNA	Antonio Maming Sr.	75,924	34.86
Independent	Phoebe Clarice Cabagnot	29,650	13.61
Independent	Ramy Panagsagan	4,940	2.27
Margin of victory		9,313	4.28%
Invalid or blank votes		22,074	10.13
Total votes		217,825	100.00
Independent gain from Liberal			

== Antique ==
Paolo Everardo Javier is the incumbent.

2013 Philippine House of Representatives election at Antique
Party	Candidate	Votes	%
Liberal	Paolo Javier	94,566	48.05
UNA	Raymundo Roquero	70,586	36.00
LM	Antero Florante Villaflor	2,014	1.02
Margin of victory		23,980	12.18%
Invalid or blank votes		29,642	15.06
Total votes		196,808	100.00
Liberal hold			

== Bacolod ==
Anthony Golez Jr. is the incumbent. Originally from the Nationalist People's Coalition (NPC), his party nominated incumbent Mayor Evelio Leonardia instead. As a result, Golez is running as an independent.

2013 Philippine House of Representatives election at Bacolod
Party	Candidate	Votes	%
NPC	Evelio Leonardia	94,622	45.42
Independent	Anthony Golez	60,053	28.83
Independent	Lyndon Caña	35,376	16.98
Independent	Ely Sergio Palma	404	0.19
Margin of victory		34,569	16.59%
Invalid or blank votes		17,860	8.57
Total votes		208,315	100.00
NPC gain from Independent			

== Capiz ==
=== 1st District ===
Antonio Del Rosario is the incumbent.

2013 Philippine House of Representatives election at Capiz's 1st district
Party	Candidate	Votes	%
Liberal	Antonio Del Rosario	100,675	59.69
NUP	Jesus Maria Jose Avelino	22,684	13.45
Independent	Conrado Tinsay	2,894	1.72
Independent	Zinon Amoroso	2,131	1.26
Margin of victory		77,991	46.24%
Invalid or blank votes		40,271	23.88
Total votes		168,655	100.00
Liberal hold			

=== 2nd District ===
Jane Castro is the incumbent.

2013 Philippine House of Representatives election at Capiz's 2nd district
Party	Candidate	Votes	%
NUP	Jane Castro	77,293	52.70
Liberal	Maria Andaya	59,829	40.79
Margin of victory		17,464	11.91
Invalid or blank votes		9,536	6.50
Total votes		146,658	100.00
NUP hold			

== Guimaras ==
Joaquin Carlos Nava is the incumbent.

2013 Philippine House of Representatives election at Guimaras
Party	Candidate	Votes	%
Liberal	JC Rahman Nava	43,013	82.78
Independent	Tomas Junco Jr.	1,257	2.42
Independent	Edwin Lim	288	0.55
Margin of victory		41,756	80.32%
Invalid or blank votes		7,423	14.28
Total votes		51,981	100.00
Liberal hold			

== Iloilo ==
=== 1st District ===
Incumbent Janette Garin is term limited and is ineligible to run. Her husband, Vice Governor Oscar Garin Jr. is running in her place.

2013 Philippine House of Representatives election at Iloilo's 1st district
Party	Candidate	Votes	%
Liberal	Richard Garin	76,128	62.54
UNA	Julieta Flores	32,519	26.71
Margin of victory		43,609	35.82%
Invalid or blank votes		13,082	10.75
Total votes		121,729	100.00
Liberal hold			

=== 2nd District ===
Augusto Syjuco Jr. is the incumbent, he was defeated by Pavia mayor Arcadio Gorriceta and placed third on election results.

2013 Philippine House of Representatives election at Iloilo's 2nd district
Party	Candidate	Votes	%
Liberal	Arcadio Gorriceta	44,310	41.60
Independent	Salvador Cabaluna III	30,773	28.89
UNA	Augusto Syjuco Jr.	23,404	21.97
Margin of victory		13,537	12.71%
Invalid or blank votes		8,033	7.54
Total votes		106,520	100.00
Liberal gain from UNA			

=== 3rd District ===
Arthur Defensor Jr. is the incumbent

2013 Philippine House of Representatives election at Iloilo's 3rd district
Party	Candidate	Votes	%
Liberal	Arthur Defensor Jr.	96,514	71.87
UNA	Francis Lavilla	23,394	17.42
Margin of victory		73,120	54.45%
Invalid or blank votes		14,377	10.71
Total votes		134,285	100.00
Liberal hold			

=== 4th District ===
Incumbent Ferjenel Biron is term limited and is ineligible to run. His brother, Hernan Biron Jr. is running in his place. His opponent is former governor Niel Tupas Sr. If Tupas elected, he will join his son Niel Jr. in the house separately.

2013 Philippine House of Representatives election at Iloilo's 4th district
Party	Candidate	Votes	%
UNA	Hernan Biron Jr.	73,528	46.14
Liberal	Niel Tupas Sr.	70,834	44.45
Margin of victory		2,694	1.69%
Invalid or blank votes		15,000	9.41
Total votes		159,362	100.00
UNA hold			

=== 5th District ===
Niel Tupas Jr. is the incumbent

2013 Philippine House of Representatives election at Iloilo's 5th District
Party	Candidate	Votes	%
Liberal	Niel Tupas Jr.	101,851	62.62
UNA	Jett Rojas	44,324	27.25
Margin of victory		57,527	35.37%
Invalid or blank votes		16,471	10.13
Total votes		162,646	100.00
Liberal hold			

== Iloilo City ==
Jerry Treñas is the incumbent. He will be facing off against former congressman Raul Gonzales Jr.

2013 Philippine House of Representatives election at Iloilo City
Party	Candidate	Votes	%
Liberal	Jerry Treñas	122,656	62.36
UNA	Raul Gonzalez Jr.	63,265	32.17
Margin of victory		59,391	30.20%
Invalid or blank votes		10,763	5.47
Total votes		196,684	100.00
Liberal hold			

== Negros Occidental ==
=== 1st District ===
Jules Ledesma is Incumbent.

2013 Philippine House of Representatives election at Negros Occidental's 1st district
Party	Candidate	Votes	%
NPC	Jules Ledesma	76,727	52.57
PMP	Nehemias Dela Cruz Sr.	47,922	32.83
Aksyon	Ernesto Librando	486	0.33
Independent	Leopoldo Sua	114	0.08
Margin of victory		28,805	19.73%
Invalid or blank votes		20,710	14.19
Total votes		145,959	100.00
NPC hold			

=== 2nd District ===
Alfredo Marañon III is term limited; he is running for the mayorship of Sagay; the National Unity Party named Leo Rafael Cueva as their nominee, he will be facing off against former Schools Division Superintendent of Cadiz City Otilia Galilea of the NPC.

2013 Philippine House of Representatives election at Negros Occidental's 2nd district
Party	Candidate	Votes	%
NUP	Leo Rafael Cueva	55,836	58.90
NPC	Otilia Galilea	11,685	12.33
Margin of victory		44,151	46.57%
Invalid or blank votes		26,282	27.72
Total votes		94,803	100.00
NUP hold			

=== 3rd District ===
Alfredo Benitez is the incumbent. He will face former Representative Jose Carlos Lacson.

2013 Philippine House of Representatives election at Negros Occidental's 3rd district
Party	Candidate	Votes	%
Liberal	Albee Benitez	107,422	59.04
Lakas	Jose Carlos Lacson	58,268	32.02
Margin of victory		49,154	24.31%
Invalid or blank votes		16,263	8.94
Total votes		181,953	100.00
Liberal hold			

=== 4th District ===
Incumbent Jeffrey Ferrer's certificate of nomination was unilaterally withdrawn by the Nationalist People's Coalition (NPC) after he campaigned for Alfredo Marañon Jr. of the United Negros Alliance in the gubernatorial election instead of NPC nominee Vice Governor Genaro Alvarez Jr. The NPC instead is supporting independent Ike Barredo's candidacy.

2013 Philippine House of Representatives election at Negros Occidental's 4th district
Party	Candidate	Votes	%
UNegA	Jeffrey Ferrer	91,457	54.80
Independent	Ike Barredo	61,499	36.85
Independent	Leonardo Erobas	570	0.35
Margin of victory		29,958	17.95%
Invalid or blank votes		13,376	8.01
Total votes		166,902	100.00

=== 5th District ===
Alejandro Mirasol is the incumbent; he won in a special election that was called after erstwhile incumbent Iggy Arroyo died.

2013 Philippine House of Representatives election at Negros Occidental's 5th district
Party	Candidate	Votes	%
Liberal	Alejandro Mirasol	73,184	45.72
Nacionalista	Emilio Yulo III	70,161	43.83
Margin of victory		3,023	1.89%
Invalid or blank votes		16,726	10.45
Total votes		160,071	100.00
Liberal hold			

=== 6th District ===
Mercedes Alvarez is the incumbent.

2013 Philippine House of Representatives election at Negros Occidental's 6th district
Party	Candidate	Votes	%
NPC	Mercedes Alvarez	100,656	55.88
NUP	Philip Arles	53,295	29.59
Margin of victory		47,361	26.29%
Invalid or blank votes		26,170	14.53
Total votes		180,121	100.00
NPC hold			
