= Enrique B. Magalona, Negros Occidental =

Municipality in Negros Occidental, Philippines

Enrique B. Magalona Saravia
- Municipality
- Municipality of Enrique B. Magalona
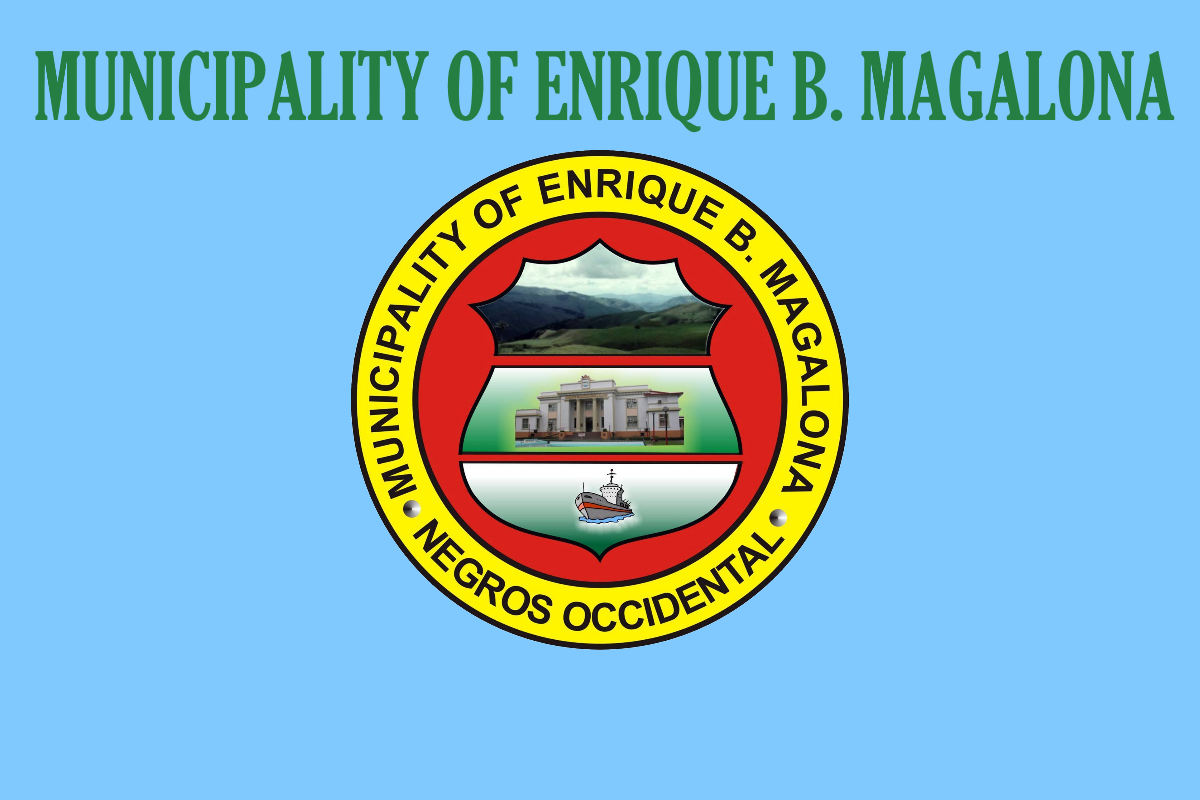
- Flag Seal
- Nickname: "Blue Crabs Capital of Negros Occidental"
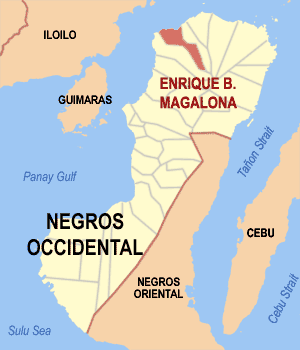
- Map of Negros Occidental with Enrique B. Magalona highlighted
- Interactive map of Enrique B. Magalona
- Location within the Philippines
- Coordinates: 10°53′N 122°58′E
- Country: Philippines
- Region: Negros Island Region
- Province: Negros Occidental
- District: 3rd district
- Named for: Enrique Magalona
- Barangays: 23 (see Barangays)

Government
  - Type: Sangguniang Bayan
  - Mayor: Matthew Louis P. Malacon (PFP)
  - Vice Mayor: Marvin M. Malacon (PFP)
  - Representative: Javier Miguel L. Benitez (PFP)
  - Municipal Council: Members: Gilda G. Parcon; Wyndel P. Depasucat; Edgardo A. Agravante, Jr.; Eric D. Matulac; Erwin B. Poniado; Ronel C. Mogul; Romulo L. Villanueva, Jr.; Rosalita M. Arsenal
  - Electorate: 41,465 voters (2025)

Area
  - Total: 113.25 km^{2} (43.73 sq mi)
- Elevation: 4.0 m (13.1 ft)
- Highest elevation: 25 m (82 ft)
- Lowest elevation: 0 m (0 ft)

Population (2024 census)
  - Total: 65,730
  - Density: 580.4/km^{2} (1,503/sq mi)
  - Households: 16,151

Economy
  - Income class: 1st municipal income class, 2nd municipal income class
  - Poverty incidence: 25.94% (2023)
  - Revenue: ₱ 287 million (2023, 2024)
  - Assets: ₱ 625.3 million (2024)
  - Expenditure: ₱ 286.8 million (2023, 2024)
  - Liabilities: ₱ 287.3 million (2024)

Service provider
  - Electricity: Northern Negros Electric Cooperative (NONECO)
- Time zone: UTC+8 (PST)
- ZIP code: 6118
- PSGC: 064508000
- IDD : area code: +63 (0)34
- Native languages: Hiligaynon; Tagalog

Enrique B. Magalona, officially the Municipality of Enrique B. Magalona (Hiligaynon: Banwa sang Enrique B. Magalona; Tagalog: Bayan ng Enrique B. Magalona), also known simply as E. B. Magalona and formerly known and still commonly referred to as Saravia, is a municipality in the province of Negros Occidental, Philippines. According to the 2024 census, it has a population of 65,730 people.

The town is also known for the Tomongtong Mangrove Eco-Trail.

== History ==
Since 1967, the municipality is named after Enrique Barrera Magalona, former Senator of the Philippines and municipal president of the municipality. It was previously named Saravia, after Don Emilio Saravia, the first political-military governor in the island during the Spanish era.

== Geography ==
Enrique B. Magalona is 23 kilometers (14 mi) from Bacolod.

=== Barangays ===
Enrique B. Magalona is politically subdivided into 23 barangays. Each barangay consists of puroks and some have sitios.

- Alacaygan
- Alicante
- Poblacion I (Barangay 1)
- Poblacion II (Barangay 2)
- Poblacion III (Barangay 3)
- Batea
- Consing
- Cudangdang
- Damgo
- Gahit
- Canlusong
- Latasan
- Madalag
- Manta-angan
- Nanca
- Pasil
- San Isidro
- San Jose
- Santo Niño
- Tabigue
- Tanza
- Tuburan
- Tomongtong

=== Climate ===
Climate data for Enrique B. Magalona, Negros Occidental
| Month | Jan | Feb | Mar | Apr | May | Jun | Jul | Aug | Sep | Oct | Nov | Dec | Year |
|---|---|---|---|---|---|---|---|---|---|---|---|---|---|
| Mean daily maximum °C (°F) | 28 (82) | 29 (84) | 30 (86) | 32 (90) | 32 (90) | 31 (88) | 30 (86) | 29 (84) | 29 (84) | 29 (84) | 29 (84) | 28 (82) | 30 (85) |
| Mean daily minimum °C (°F) | 23 (73) | 23 (73) | 23 (73) | 24 (75) | 25 (77) | 25 (77) | 25 (77) | 24 (75) | 24 (75) | 24 (75) | 24 (75) | 23 (73) | 24 (75) |
| Average precipitation mm (inches) | 57 (2.2) | 37 (1.5) | 41 (1.6) | 42 (1.7) | 98 (3.9) | 155 (6.1) | 187 (7.4) | 162 (6.4) | 179 (7.0) | 188 (7.4) | 114 (4.5) | 78 (3.1) | 1,338 (52.8) |
| Average rainy days | 12.0 | 7.7 | 9.2 | 10.2 | 19.5 | 24.6 | 26.9 | 25.1 | 25.5 | 25.2 | 18.0 | 13.0 | 216.9 |
Source: Meteoblue

== Demographics ==
Population census of Enrique B. Magalona
| Year | Pop. | ±% p.a. |
|---|---|---|
| 1903 | 13,627 | — |
| 1918 | 14,021 | +0.19% |
| 1939 | 21,289 | +2.01% |
| 1948 | 19,204 | −1.14% |
| 1960 | 32,340 | +4.44% |
| 1970 | 35,201 | +0.85% |
| 1975 | 43,185 | +4.18% |
| 1980 | 44,411 | +0.56% |
| 1990 | 48,866 | +0.96% |
| 1995 | 54,421 | +2.04% |
| 2000 | 54,490 | +0.03% |
| 2007 | 57,424 | +0.73% |
| 2010 | 59,434 | +1.26% |
| 2015 | 62,921 | +1.09% |
| 2020 | 64,290 | +0.45% |
| 2024 | 65,730 | +0.53% |
Source: Philippine Statistics Authority

== Economy ==
Poverty incidence of Enrique B. Magalona (%)

Source: Philippine Statistics Authority

== Notable personalities ==
- Enrique Magalona - Senator of the Philippines
- Hiro Peralta - Film and television actor
- Stephen Paduano - Member of the Philippine House of Representatives for Abang Lingkod Party-list
- Haydee Yorac - 11th Chairperson of the Presidential Commission on Good Government, Acting Chairperson Commission on Elections (Philippines)

== See also ==
- List of renamed cities and municipalities in the Philippines
