= Calatrava, Negros Occidental =

Municipality in Negros Occidental, Philippines

Calatrava
- Municipality
- Municipality of Calatrava
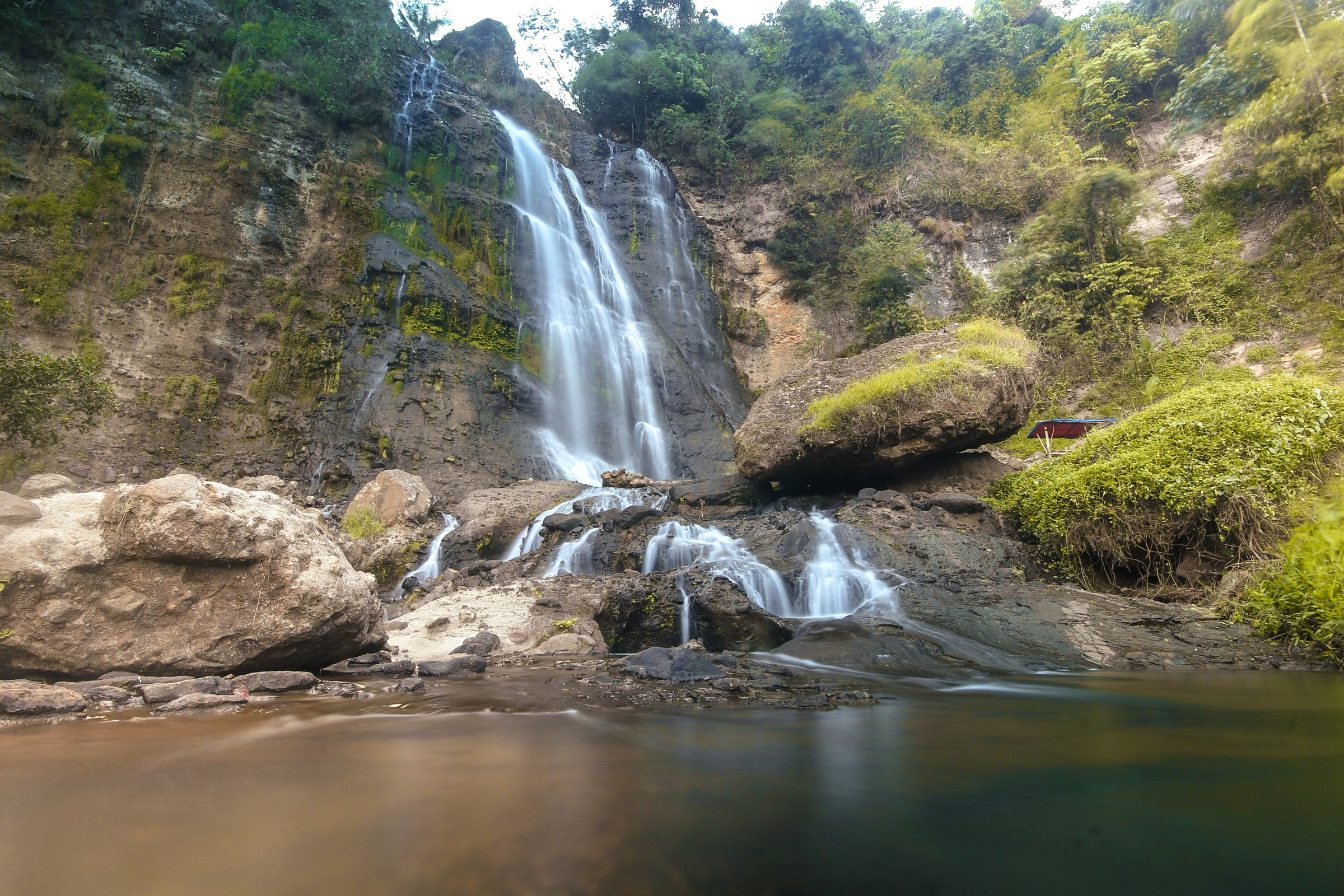
- Balea Falls in Barangay Marcelo

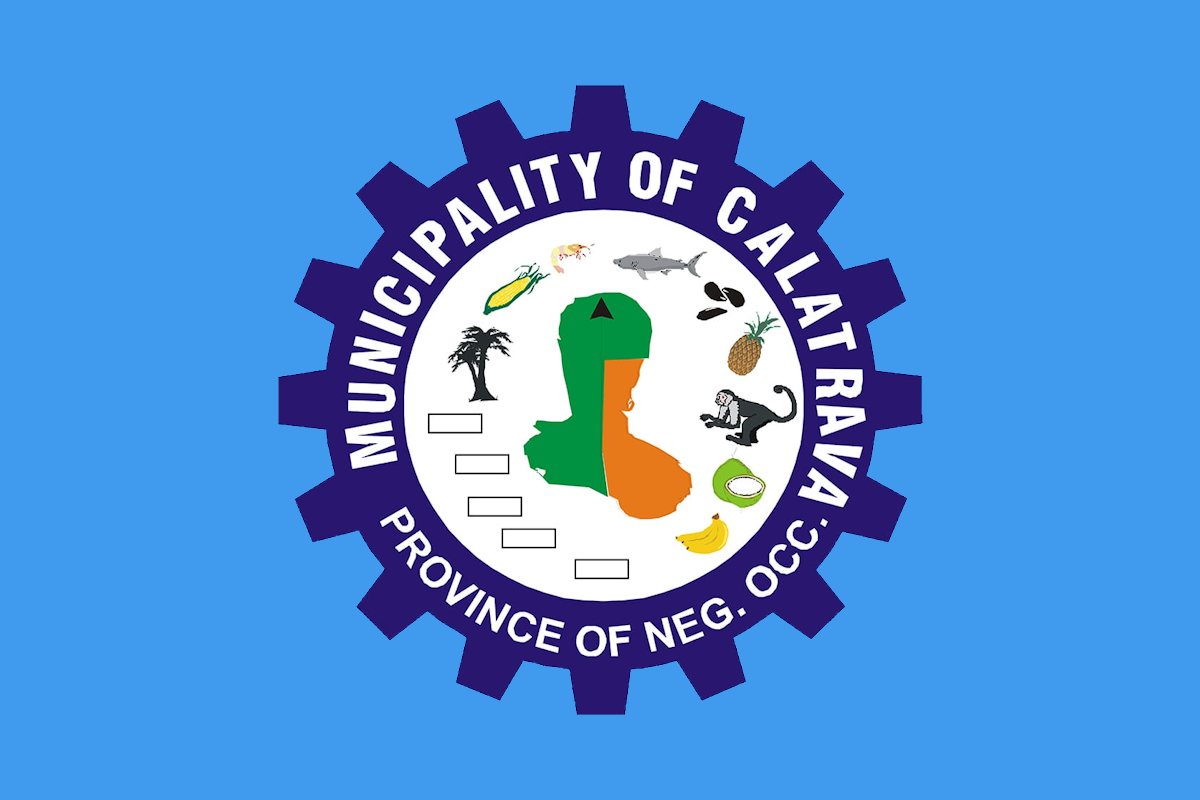
- Flag Seal
- Nickname: Home of the Friendly Monkeys
- Motto: "Larga Calatrava"
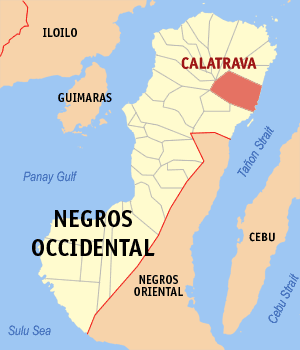
- Map of Negros Occidental with Calatrava highlighted
- Interactive map of Calatrava
- Location within the Philippines
- Coordinates: 10°36′N 123°29′E
- Country: Philippines
- Region: Negros Island Region
- Province: Negros Occidental
- District: 1st district
- Named for: Order of Calatrava and Calatrava la Nueva
- Barangays: 40 (see Barangays)

Government
  - Type: Sangguniang Bayan
  - Mayor: Marilyn A. Era
  - Vice Mayor: Florido C. Dinapo (NPC)
  - Representative: Julio A. Ledesma IV (NPC)
  - Municipal Council: Members: Kylie Anieva Palma-Isaias; Agustin U. Camara; Fernando D. Leonor; Elmar N. Secretaria; Juice G. Villamor; Eldie G. Monterde; Regolo V. Villagracia, Sr.; Melebeth M. Tan
  - Electorate: 53,559 voters (2025)

Area
  - Total: 504.50 km^{2} (194.79 sq mi)
- Elevation: 66 m (217 ft)
- Highest elevation: 379 m (1,243 ft)
- Lowest elevation: −2 m (−6.6 ft)

Population (2024 census)
  - Total: 83,813
  - Density: 166.13/km^{2} (430.28/sq mi)
  - Households: 20,709

Economy
  - Income class: 1st municipal income class
  - Poverty incidence: 29.71% (2023)
  - Revenue: ₱ 576.1 million (2024)
  - Assets: ₱ 1,133 million (2024)
  - Expenditure: ₱ 237 million (2024)
  - Liabilities: ₱ 201 million (2024)

Service provider
  - Electricity: Northern Negros Electric Cooperative (NONECO)
- Time zone: UTC+8 (PST)
- ZIP code: 6126
- PSGC: 064505000
- IDD : area code: +63 (0)34
- Native languages: Hiligaynon; Tagalog; Cebuano
- Website: calatrava-negocc.gov.ph

Calatrava, officially the Municipality of Calatrava (Cebuano: Lungsod sa Calatrava; Hiligaynon: Banwa sang Calatrava; Tagalog: Bayan ng Calatrava), is a municipality in the province of Negros Occidental, Philippines. According to the 2024 census, it has a population of 83,813 people.

== History ==
Municipality of Calatrava was formally organized by virtue of Administrative Code of 1917 under Section 68 effective January 1, 1924 through the Secretary of the Interior for the recommendation to the Governor-General.

== Geography ==
Calatrava is 101 kilometres (63 mi) from Bacolod via Negros Occidental Eco-Tourism Highway and 182 kilometres (113 mi) from Dumaguete, the capital of Negros Oriental. The town is known for its monkey sanctuary.

=== Barangays ===
Calatrava is politically subdivided into 40 barangays. Each barangay consists of puroks and some have sitios.

- Agpangi
- Ani-e
- Bagacay
- Bantayanon
- Buenavista
- Cabungahan
- Calampisawan
- Cambayobo
- Castellano
- Cruz
- Dolis
- Hilub-Ang
- Hinab-Ongan
- Ilaya
- Laga-an
- Lalong
- Lemery
- Lipat-on
- Lo-ok (Poblacion)
- Ma-aslob
- Macasilao
- Malanog
- Malatas
- Marcelo
- Mina-utok
- Menchaca
- Minapasuk
- Mahilum
- Paghumayan
- Pantao
- Patun-an
- Pinocutan
- Refugio
- San Benito
- San Isidro
- Suba (Poblacion)
- Telim
- Tigbao
- Tigbon
- Winaswasan

=== Climate ===
Climate data for Calatrava, Negros Occidental
Month	Jan	Feb	Mar	Apr	May	Jun	Jul	Aug	Sep	Oct	Nov	Dec	Year
Mean daily maximum °C (°F)	28 (82)	29 (84)	30 (86)	32 (90)	31 (88)	30 (86)	29 (84)	30 (86)	29 (84)	29 (84)	29 (84)	28 (82)	30 (85)
Mean daily minimum °C (°F)	23 (73)	23 (73)	23 (73)	24 (75)	25 (77)	25 (77)	25 (77)	25 (77)	25 (77)	24 (75)	24 (75)	24 (75)	24 (75)
Average precipitation mm (inches)	120 (4.7)	87 (3.4)	95 (3.7)	97 (3.8)	187 (7.4)	263 (10.4)	251 (9.9)	220 (8.7)	227 (8.9)	268 (10.6)	220 (8.7)	158 (6.2)	2,193 (86.4)
Average rainy days	16.1	12.6	15.4	16.8	25.8	28.4	29.1	27.9	27.7	28.5	23.9	18.4	270.6
Source: Meteoblue (modeled/calculated data, not measured locally)

== Demographics ==
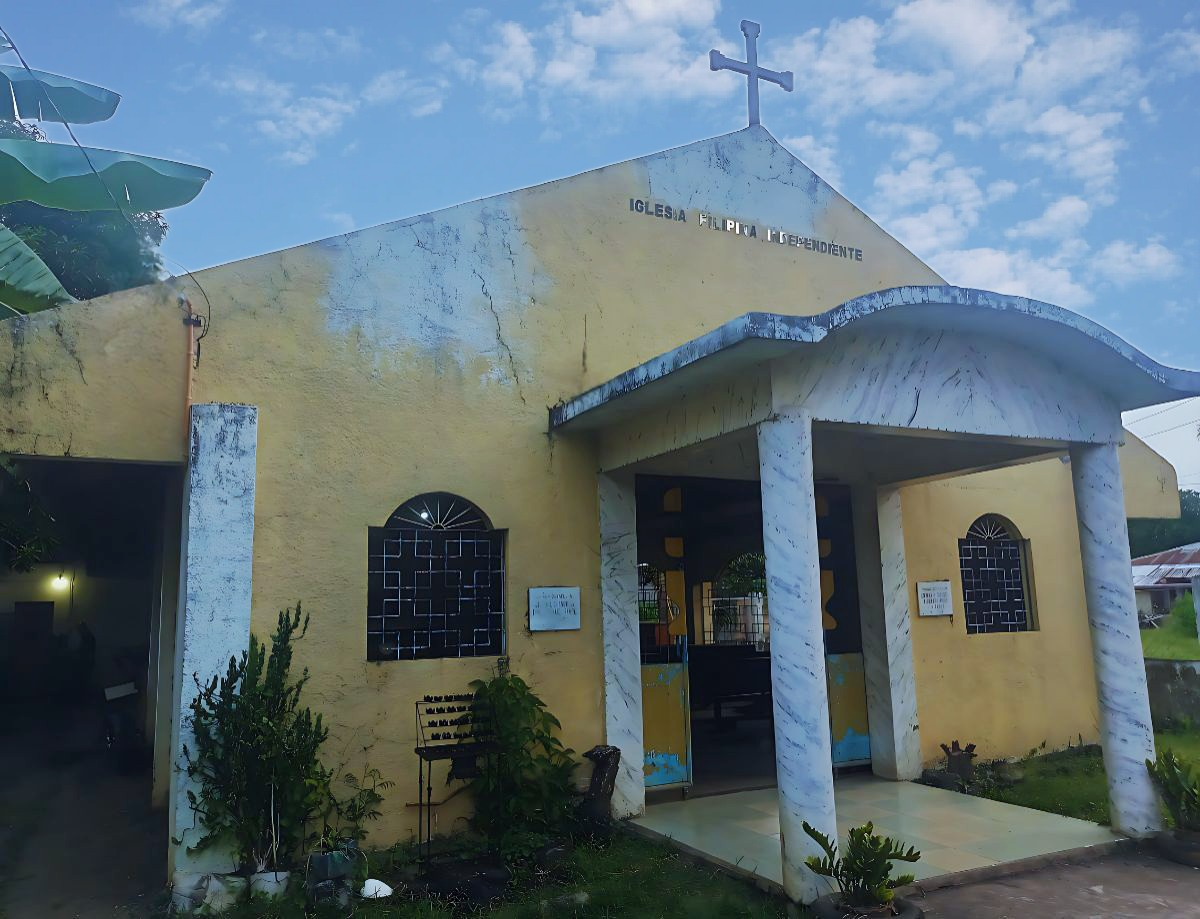
The century-old Iglesia Filipina Independiente (Philippine Independent Church) Mission Church of San Isidro de Labrador in Barangay San Isidro, Calatrava. It is popularly called the "Aglipayan Church" among the town's residents.

Population census of Calatrava

Year	Pop.	±% p.a.
1903	6,385	—
1939	38,695	+5.13%
1948	53,805	+3.73%
1960	65,888	+1.70%
1970	53,151	−2.12%

Year	Pop.	±% p.a.
1975	58,867	+2.07%
1980	58,163	−0.24%
1990	60,228	+0.35%
1995	69,902	+2.83%
2000	74,623	+1.41%

Year	Pop.	±% p.a.
2007	78,452	+0.69%
2010	79,009	+0.26%
2015	80,624	+0.39%
2020	82,540	+0.50%
2024	83,813	+0.37%

Source: Philippine Statistics Authority

=== Languages ===
The people in the town primarily speak Cebuano, followed by Hiligaynon. Tagalog and English are generally understood especially in the urban areas.

== Economy ==
Poverty incidence of Calatrava (%)

Source: Philippine Statistics Authority

The municipality of Calatrava is predominantly agricultural with almost 60% of its total land area devoted to agricultural use. Sugarcane occupies the largest share of agricultural land with almost one third followed by rice and corn. The total production per year can meet the cereal demand within the municipality with the excess being exported to nearby municipalities and cities.

Other sectors include livestock, poultry, and fisheries.

=== Energy ===
The ABOITIZ Renewables, Inc. operates its 173-megawatt-peak "Calatrava Solar Project", delivering power with the aid of the NGCP through the Calatrava substation.
