= Manapla =

Municipality in Negros Occidental, Philippines

- Municipality
- Municipality of Manapla
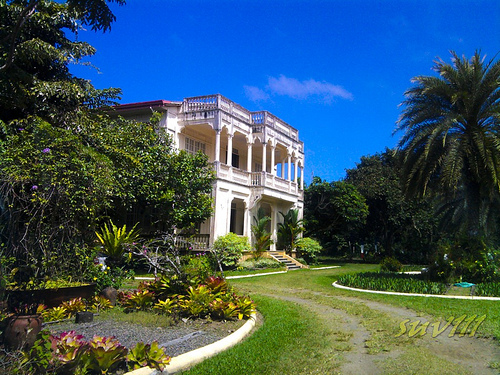
- Hacienda Santa Rosalia, Manapla

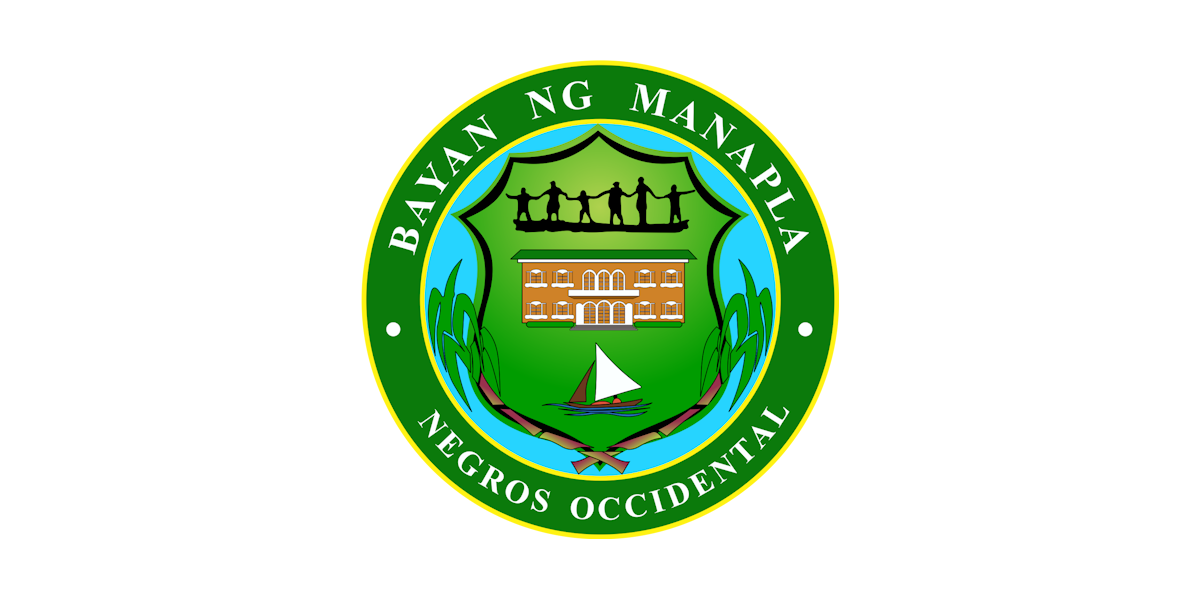
- Flag Seal
- Nickname: The Negrosanon Top End
- Motto(s): Sanyog, Manapla!
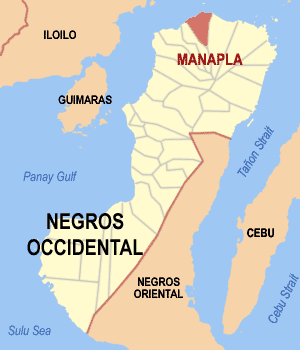
- Map of Negros Occidental with Manapla highlighted
- Interactive map of Manapla
- Location within the Philippines
- Coordinates: 10°57′29″N 123°07′23″E
- Country: Philippines
- Region: Negros Island Region
- Province: Negros Occidental
- District: 2nd district
- Named for: Crispula "Manang Pula" Santillan-Gallo
- Barangays: 12 (see Barangays)

Government
  - Type: Sangguniang Bayan
  - Mayor: Mikaela Socorro L. Escalante (Lakas)
  - Vice Mayor: Edgar B. Pagayonan (Lakas)
  - Representative: Alfredo D. Marañon III (NUP)
  - Municipal Council: Members: Princess S. Borla; Marcos Bruno Ramon L. Escalante; Felix J. Robles; Nerylynn T. Lim; Ramonito G. Abanales; Elizabeth Andrino-Polanco; Bobby P. Barrido, Sr.; Ma. Ceferina Amor H. Aguilar
  - Electorate: 33,709 voters (2025)

Area
  - Total: 112.86 km^{2} (43.58 sq mi)
- Elevation: 10 m (33 ft)
- Highest elevation: 64 m (210 ft)
- Lowest elevation: 0 m (0 ft)

Population (2024 census)
  - Total: 55,882
  - Density: 495.14/km^{2} (1,282.4/sq mi)
  - Households: 13,297

Economy
  - Income class: 1st municipal income class
  - Poverty incidence: 26.95% (2023)
  - Revenue: ₱ 306.1 million (2024)
  - Assets: ₱ 832 million (2024)
  - Expenditure: ₱ 230.2 million (2024)
  - Liabilities: ₱ 217.8 million (2024)

Service provider
  - Electricity: Northern Negros Electric Cooperative (NONECO)
- Time zone: UTC+8 (PST)
- ZIP code: 6120
- PSGC: 064518000
- IDD : area code: +63 (0)34
- Native languages: Hiligaynon; Tagalog
- Website: manapla.gov.ph

Manapla, officially the Municipality of Manapla, is a municipality in the province of Negros Occidental, Philippines. According to the 2024 census, it has a population of 55,882 people.

The town is notable for its signature delicacies puto and pinasugbo.

== Etymology ==
The town got its name from Críspula Santillán de Gallo, also fondly called by the residents as "Manang Pula", the wife of the town's first appointed capitan municipal Bernardo Gallo. Manang Pula was a known respected elder in the locality and foremost influential faithful of the Iglesia Filipina Independiente. The town name was later shortened to "Manapla" which was carried on until present. The town celebrates the "Manang Pula Festival" every August 16 which also coincides with the feast day of the town's patron saint, Saint Roch (San Roque).

== Geography ==
Manapla is 44 kilometres (27 mi) from Bacolod.

=== Barangays ===
Manapla is politically subdivided into 12 barangays. Each barangay consists of puroks and some have sitios.

- Chamberi
- Barangay I (Poblacion)
- Barangay I-A (Poblacion)
- Barangay I-B (Poblacion)
- Barangay II (Poblacion)
- Barangay II-A (Poblacion)
- Punta Mesa
- Punta Salong
- Purisima
- San Pablo
- Santa Teresa
- Tortosa

=== Climate ===
Climate data for Manapla, Negros Occidental
| Month | Jan | Feb | Mar | Apr | May | Jun | Jul | Aug | Sep | Oct | Nov | Dec | Year |
|---|---|---|---|---|---|---|---|---|---|---|---|---|---|
| Mean daily maximum °C (°F) | 28 (82) | 29 (84) | 30 (86) | 32 (90) | 32 (90) | 31 (88) | 30 (86) | 29 (84) | 29 (84) | 29 (84) | 29 (84) | 28 (82) | 30 (85) |
| Mean daily minimum °C (°F) | 23 (73) | 23 (73) | 23 (73) | 24 (75) | 25 (77) | 25 (77) | 25 (77) | 24 (75) | 24 (75) | 24 (75) | 24 (75) | 23 (73) | 24 (75) |
| Average precipitation mm (inches) | 57 (2.2) | 37 (1.5) | 41 (1.6) | 42 (1.7) | 98 (3.9) | 155 (6.1) | 187 (7.4) | 162 (6.4) | 179 (7.0) | 188 (7.4) | 114 (4.5) | 78 (3.1) | 1,338 (52.8) |
| Average rainy days | 12.0 | 7.7 | 9.2 | 10.2 | 19.5 | 24.6 | 26.9 | 25.1 | 25.5 | 25.2 | 18.0 | 13.0 | 216.9 |
Source: Meteoblue

== Demographics ==
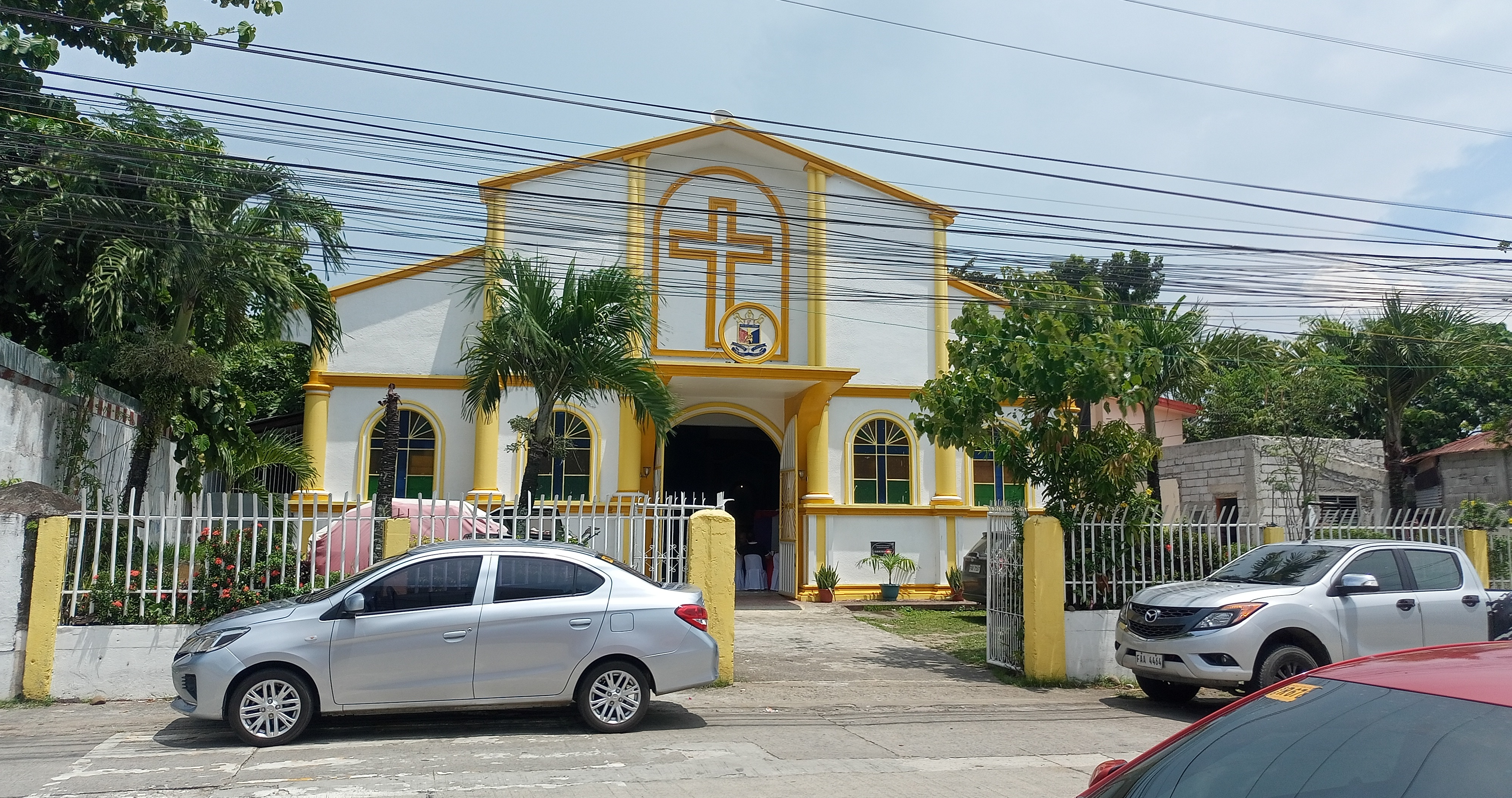
The Philippine Independent Church (Iglesia Filipina Independiente) Parish Church of Christ the King.

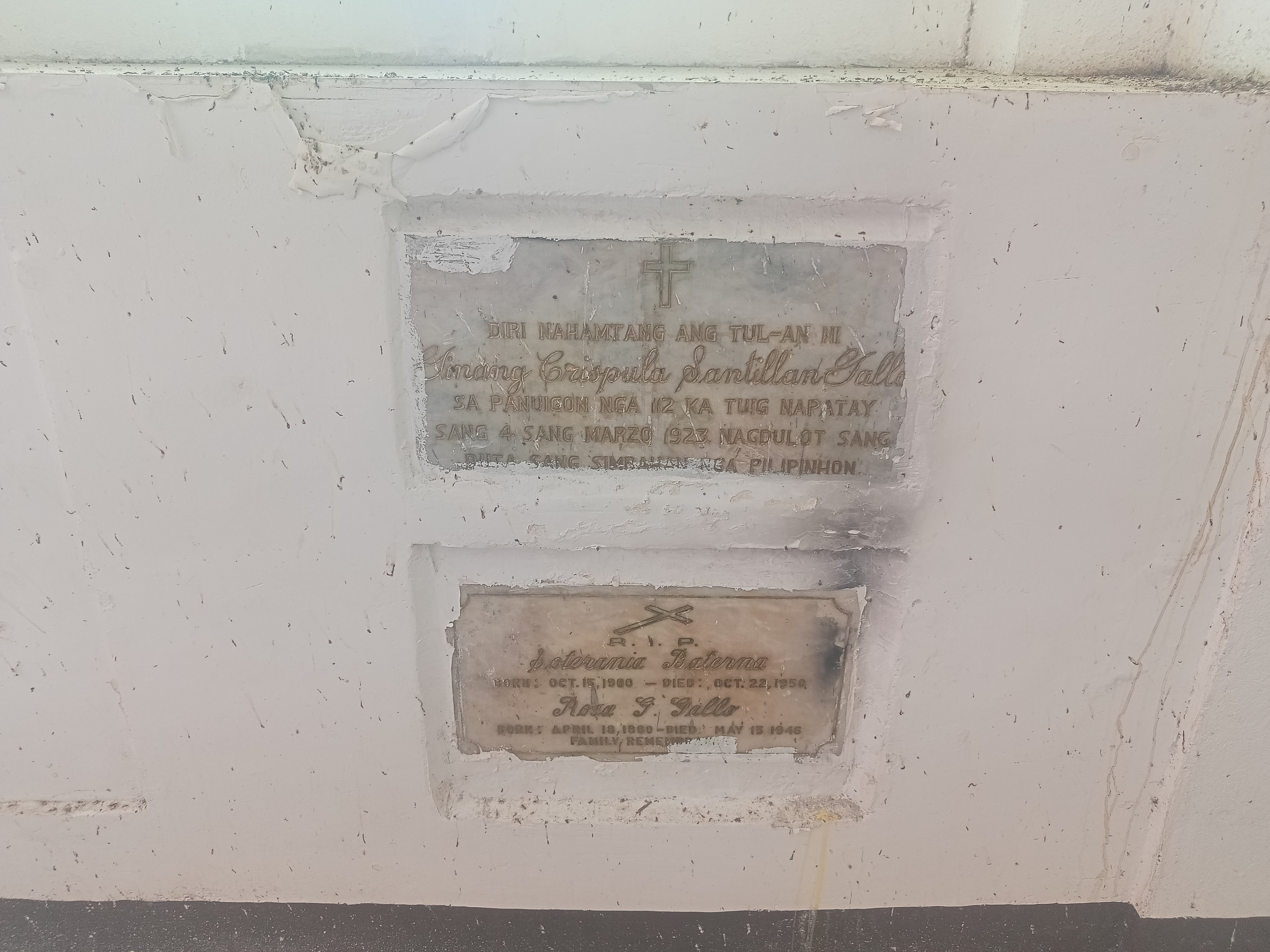
Resting place of Crispula "Manang Pula" Santillan-Gallo, interred inside the Iglesia Filipina Independiente Parish Church of Christ the King.

Population census of Manapla
| Year | Pop. | ±% p.a. |
|---|---|---|
| 1903 | 10,123 | — |
| 1918 | 10,033 | −0.06% |
| 1939 | 19,490 | +3.21% |
| 1948 | 35,218 | +6.79% |
| 1960 | 46,809 | +2.40% |
| 1970 | 31,097 | −4.00% |
| 1975 | 38,357 | +4.30% |
| 1980 | 40,524 | +1.10% |
| 1990 | 40,095 | −0.11% |
| 1995 | 44,301 | +1.89% |
| 2000 | 49,581 | +2.44% |
| 2007 | 52,428 | +0.77% |
| 2010 | 52,687 | +0.18% |
| 2015 | 54,845 | +0.77% |
| 2020 | 55,083 | +0.09% |
| 2024 | 55,882 | +0.35% |
Source: Philippine Statistics Authority

Majority of the people in Manapla are adherents of the Roman Catholic Church and the Philippine Independent Church.

== Economy ==
Poverty incidence of Manapla (%)

Source: Philippine Statistics Authority
