= Jules Ledesma =

Filipino businessman and politician (born 1960)

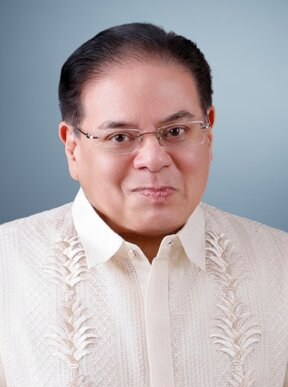
- Official portrait, 2025

Member of the House of Representatives from Negros Occidental’s 1st district
- Incumbent
- Assumed office June 30, 2025
- Preceded by: Gerardo Valmayor Jr.
- In office June 30, 2007 – June 30, 2016
- Preceded by: Tranquilino Carmona
- Succeeded by: Melecio Yap Jr.
- In office June 30, 1995 – June 30, 2004
- Preceded by: Tranquilino Carmona
- Succeeded by: Tranquilino Carmona

Personal details
- Born: Julio Arenas Ledesma IV; August 1, 1960 (age 66) Manila, Philippines
- Party: NPC (2007–present)
- Other political affiliations: UNEGA (2001–2007); Lakas (1995–2007)
- Spouse(s): Victoria Pek (died 2000) Assunta De Rossi (m. 2002)
- Relations: Maria Rachel Arenas (first cousin); López family of Iloilo
- Children: 3
- Education: De La Salle University; Santa Clara University (BS); University of Asia and the Pacific (SBEP)
- Occupation: Businessman, politician

Julio "Jules" Arenas Ledesma IV (born August 1, 1960) is a Filipino businessman and politician. He is currently serving as representative of the 1st District of Negros Occidental since 2025, a position he previously held from 2007 to 2016 and from 1995 to 2004.

== Early life and education ==
Ledesma was born on August 1, 1960 in Manila, to Carlos "Charlie" Ledesma and Conchita Lopez Arenas, a daughter of Doña Julieta Hofileña Lopez from López family of Iloilo. His parents came from a prominent family in Negros Occidental and Iloilo.

He studied De La Salle College for his primary education. He studied Colegio San Agustin – Makati for his high school education. He studied De La Salle University but transferred to Santa Clara University where he graduated with the degree of Bachelor of Science in Commerce. He took up the course of Strategic Business Economic Program at the University of Asia and the Pacific.

== Political career ==
Ledesma represented the first district of Negros Occidental from 1995 to 2004.

Ledesma represented again the first district of Negros Occidental from 2007 to 2016.

In 2025 elections, Ledesma returned as representative for the first district of Negros Occidental.

== Personal life ==
In 2002, Ledesma is married to Assunta De Rossi and has one daughter.

Ledesma also have two children from his previous marriage with Maria Victoria Tsung Pek who died due to cancer in 2000.

== Electoral history ==
Electoral history of Jules Ledesma
Year	Office	Party		Votes received				Result
Year	Office	Local	National	Total	%	P.	Swing	Result
1995	Representative (Negros Occidental–1st)	—N/a	Lakas	43,773	49.77%	1st	—N/a	Won
1998	Representative (Negros Occidental–1st)	—N/a	Lakas	66,537	100.00%	1st	—N/a	Unopposed
2001	Representative (Negros Occidental–1st)	UNEGA	Lakas	—N/a	—N/a	1st	—N/a	Won
2007	Representative (Negros Occidental–1st)	UNEGA	Lakas	63,153	—N/a	1st	—N/a	Won
2010	Representative (Negros Occidental–1st)	—N/a	NPC	123,970	94.01%	1st	—N/a	Won
2013	Representative (Negros Occidental–1st)	—N/a	NPC	76,727	52.57%	1st	—N/a	Won
2025	Representative (Negros Occidental–1st)	—N/a	NPC	157,328	95.27%	1st	—N/a	Won
