= Philippine highway network =

Highway system of the Philippines

- Shields for N1 / AH26 (Pan-Philippine Highway), N61 (national primary road), and N120 (national secondary road)

System information
- Maintained by the Department of Public Works and Highways (DPWH)
- Formed: Pre-colonial period

Highway names
- National primary roads: Nx, Nxx
- National secondary roads: Nxxx, Nxxx-x
- National tertiary roads: Names only (no numbers assigned)

System links
- Roads in the Philippines; Highways; Expressways; List

The Philippine highway network is a network of national roads owned and maintained by the Department of Public Works and Highways (DPWH) and organized into three classifications according to their function or purpose: national primary, secondary, and tertiary roads. The national roads connecting major cities are numbered from N1 to N83. They are mostly single and dual carriageways linking two or more cities.

As of October 16, 2023, it has a total length of 22,337.26 kilometers (13,879.73 mi) of concrete roads, 12,459.96 kilometers (7,742.26 mi) of asphalt roads, 342.02 kilometers (212.52 mi) of gravel roads, and 24.89 kilometers (15.47 mi) of earth roads, with a grand total of 35,164.13 kilometers (21,849.98 mi). According to a 2011 report from the Asian Development Bank, the extent of the road network in the Philippines is comparable with or better than many neighboring developing countries in Southeast Asia. However, in terms of the quality of the road system, i.e., the percentage of paved roads and the percentage of those in good or fair condition, the country lagged behind its neighbors as of 2012.

== Classification ==
The national roads in the Philippines are classified into three types by the Department of Public Works and Highways under the Philippine Highway Act of 1953 (Republic Act No. 917) and the series of memorandums issued by the department between 2009 and 2014.

=== National primary ===
The national primary roads are roads that form parts of the main trunkline system and directly connect three or more major cities and metropolitan areas with a population of at least 100,000. They are further classified into the north–south backbone, east–west lateral, and other roads of strategic importance. The north–south backbone refers to the main trunkline, the Pan-Philippine Highway (N1, also designated as Asian Highway 26), which runs from Laoag in the northernmost parts of Luzon to Zamboanga City in western Mindanao, interconnecting the country's major islands. The east–west lateral roads are roads that traverse this backbone and runs east–west across the different islands. Other roads of strategic importance provide access to other areas vital for regional development and infrastructure.

=== National secondary ===
The national secondary roads are roads that complement the primary roads and provide access to other major population centers. They directly link smaller cities and provincial capitals, airports, seaports, military bases and tourist centers to the primary roads.

=== National tertiary ===
The third classification was introduced in 2014 known as national tertiary roads. They include other existing roads administered by the DPWH which perform a local function.

== Numbering system ==
The national roads in the Philippines are labelled with pentagonal black-on-white highway shields. Under the route numbering system of the Department of Public Works and Highways, highways numbered from N1 to N11 are the main routes or priority corridors, such as the national primary roads that connect three or more cities. The other primary roads that link two cities and municipalities with 100,000 people or less are numbered N51 to N83.

The national secondary roads are assigned with three-digit numbers where the first digit usually corresponds to the number of the primary road it links to. In the case where the secondary road connects to more than one primary road, its first digit is the lower numbered primary route.

In Metro Manila, an older route numbering system is also being implemented alongside the National Route Numbering System of the Department of Public Works and Highways. Created in 1945, Manila's arterial road network consists of 10 radial roads which serve the purpose of conveying traffic in and out of the city of Manila and are numbered in a counter-clockwise pattern, and 6 circumferential roads that serve as the beltways of the city.

=== Numbered routes ===
The Philippine highway network consists of the following routes, as of 2021:

==== Primary roads ====
Number	Length (km)	Length (mi)	Northern/eastern terminus	Southern/western terminus	Local names	Formed	Removed	Notes
N1	3517	2185	N2 / N100 in Laoag, Ilocos Norte	N966 / N970 / N971 in Zamboanga City	Maharlika Highway (Note: Although it is designated as Maharlika Highway from Laoag to Zamboanga, there are some portions of the highway that are named locally, for example, the portion of the highway from Davao City to Digos, Davao del Sur has been named as Davao–Digos Road.)	1960s	current	Also co-signed with AH26, except between Guiguinto and Quezon City and Muntinlupa and Calamba. Route has 19 km (12 mi) gap in Metro Manila.
N2	473	294	N1 / N100 in Laoag, Ilocos Norte	E1 / N1 in Guiguinto, Bulacan	MacArthur Highway / Manila North Road	1928	current	Quezon Avenue in San Fernando, La Union.
N3	118	73	N1 in Gapan, Nueva Ecija	N305 / N306 in Olongapo	Jose Abad Santos Avenue	Pre-colonial period	current	Rizal Avenue in Olongapo proper
N4	49	30	N1 / N421-2 in Santo Tomas, Batangas	N436 / N437 in Batangas City	President Jose P. Laurel Highway (Manila–Batangas Road) General Malvar Avenue (Santo Tomas)	2014	current	Also known as Ayala Highway between General Luna Street and B. Morada Avenue (Route 431), in Lipa. Distance excludes spur ending at Santo Tomas city proper.
N5	125	78	N505 in Roxas, Capiz	N501 in Iloilo City	Iloilo-Capiz Road Senator Benigno S. Aquino Jr. Avenue	2014	current	New routing in Iloilo City via Jaro-Mandurriao (via El 98 Street) and Benigno Aquino Sr. Avenue
N6	155	96	N7 / N69 in Bacolod	N7 in Bais, Negros Oriental	Bacolod South Road Bais–Kabankalan Road	2014	current	
N7	398	247	N6 / N69 in Bacolod	N712 in Bayawan, Negros Oriental	Bacolod South Road Bacolod North Road Dumaguete North Road Dumaguete South Road	2014	current	Passes through Cadiz and San Carlos
N8	174	108	N810 in Danao, Cebu	N830 in Santander, Cebu	Cebu North Road (north of Cebu City) Natalio Bacalso Avenue (south of Cebu City)	2014	current	Portions in Cebu City locally named Osmena Boulevard, General Maxilom Avenue and M.J. Cuenco Avenue. M.C. Briones Street in Mandaue
N9			N1 in Butuan	N9 in Aurora, Zamboanga del Sur	Butuan–Cagayan de Oro–Iligan Road	2014	current	
N10	278	173	N1 in Davao City	N9 in Cagayan de Oro	Bukidnon–Davao Road; Sayre Highway (Maramag–Cagayan de Oro)	2014	current	Spur of AH26
N11	18	11	N129 in Quezon City	East Service Road in Taguig	C-5 Road	1986	current	
N51	130	81	N1 in Tuguegarao, Cagayan	N1 in Santiago, Isabela	Santiago–Tuguegarao Road	2014	current	
N52	40	25	N51 in Enrile, Cagayan	N224 in Tabuk, Kalinga	Kalinga–Cagayan Road	2014	current	
N53	11	7	N1 in Cauayan, Isabela	N51 in Cabatuan, Isabela	Cauayan–Cabatuan Road	2014	current	
N54	84	42	N2 in Bauang, La Union	N2 in Rosario, La Union	Naguilian Road Kennon Road	American Colonial Period	current	Passes through Baguio
N55	129	80	N2 in Santo Tomas, La Union	N2 in Tarlac City	Pangasinan–La Union Road (Santo Tomas-Dagupan) Pangasinan–Zambales Road (Dagupan-Lingayen) Romulo Highway (Lingayen–Tarlac City)	2014	current	Passes through Dagupan
N56	52	32	N1 in San Jose, Nueva Ecija	N2 in Santo Tomas, Pangasinan	San Jose–Lupao Road Lupao–Umingan Road Umingan–Rosales Road Carmen–Rosales Road	2014	current	
N57	28	17	N2 in Urdaneta, Pangasinan	N55 in Dagupan	Urdaneta–Dagupan Road	2014	current	
N58	39	24	N1 in Santa Rosa, Nueva Ecija	N2 in Tarlac City	Santa Rosa–Tarlac Road	2014	current	Tarlac–Santa Rosa Road within Tarlac.
N59	19	12	N600 in Antipolo, Rizal	N1 / N180 in Quezon City	Sumulong Highway Marikina–Infanta Highway Aurora Boulevard	1900	current	
N60	28	17	N600 in Antipolo, Rizal	N1 / N184 in Quezon City	Ortigas Avenue; Corazon C. Aquino Avenue (Taytay to Antipolo)	2014	current	
N60	2.49	1.55	N60 in Taytay, Rizal	N601 in Taytay, Rizal	Taytay Diversion Road		current	
N60	1.83	1.14	N601 in Angono, Rizal	N601 in Binangonan, Rizal	Angono Diversion Road		current	
N60	1.94	1.20	N601 in Binangonan, Rizal	N601 in Binangonan, Rizal	Binangonan Diversion Road		current	
N60	10.93	6.79	N601 in Morong, Rizal	N601 in Pililla, Rizal	Sagbat–Pililla Diversion Road		current	
N61	2.2	1.4	N1 / N120 in Pasay	N63 in Parañaque	Roxas Boulevard (EDSA to MIA Road)	1910s	current	
N62	26	16	N194 in Parañaque	Cavite City	Quirino Avenue Diego Cera Avenue Aguinaldo Highway (Bacoor to Tirona Highway)Tirona Highway Magdiwang Highway Manila–Cavite Road	Spanish colonial period	current	
N63	7	4	N195 in Parañaque	N144 Muntinlupa	Dr. Santos Avenue	1921	current	
N64	25	16	N62 in Kawit, Cavite	N65 / N403 / N404 in Trece Martires	Antero Soriano Highway (Kawit–Tanza) Tanza–Trece Martires Road	2014	current	
N65	27	17	N1 in Biñan, Laguna	N64 / N403 / N404 in Trece Martires	Governor's Drive (Trece Martires–Carmona); General Malvar Street (Biñan)	1970s	current	
N66	60.2	37.4	N1 in Calamba, Laguna	N601 in Famy, Laguna	Calamba-Pagsanjan Road; Manila East Road (Pagsanjan to Famy)	American colonial period	current	
N67	18	11	N66 in Victoria, Laguna	N1 in San Pablo, Laguna	Calauan–Victoria Road Calauan–San Pablo Road	2014	current	Distance excludes spurs to Bay and Maharlika Highway at San Rafael, San Pablo
N68	93	58	N1 in Santa Elena, Camarines Norte	N1 in Sipocot, Camarines Sur	Andaya Highway	1950s	current	Passes through Santa Elena, Camarines Norte to Tagkawayan, Quezon as Quirino Highway and through Del Gallego, Camarines Sur to Sipocot, Camarines Sur as Rolando Andaya Highway.
N69	81	50	N6 / N7 in Bacolod	N7 in San Carlos, Negros Occidental	Negros Occidental Eco-Tourism Highway	2014	current	
N70	167	104	N1 in Palo, Leyte	N1 in Mahaplag, Leyte	Palo–Carigara–Ormoc Road (Palo-Ormoc) Ormoc–Baybay–Southern Leyte Boundary Road (Ormoc–Baybay) Tacloban–Baybay Road (Baybay–Mahaplag)	2014	current	AH26 between Palo and Ormoc. Passes through Ormoc.
N73	46	29	N902 in Bislig, Surigao del Sur	N1 in Trento, Agusan del Sur	Cuevas–Bislig Road	2014	current	
N74	116	72	N1 in Tagum, Davao del Norte	N1 in Mati, Davao Oriental	Surigao–Davao Coastal Road	2014	current	
N75	165	103	N1 in Digos,, Davao del Sur	N1 in Sultan Kudarat, Maguindanao del Norte	Davao–Cotabato Road	American colonial period	current	
N76	72	45	N75 in Makilala, Cotabato	N1 in Isulan, Sultan Kudarat	Makilala–Allah Valley Road	2014	current	
N77	99	61	N9 in Iligan	N1 in Malabang, Lanao del Sur	Iligan–Marawi Road Narciso Ramos Highway (Marawi–Malabang segment)	2014	current	
N78	70	43	N79 in Ozamiz, Misamis Occidental	N9 in Aurora, Zamboanga del Sur	Ozamiz-Pagadian Road	2014	current	
N79	302	188	N78 in Ozamiz, Misamis Occidental	N1 in Ipil, Zamboanga Sibugay	Ozamiz–Oroquieta Road Oroquieta–Dipolog Road Dipolog–Sindangan–Liloy Road Liloy–Ipil Road	2014	current	Passes through Oroquieta and Dipolog
N80	82	51	N79 in Dipolog, Zamboanga del Norte	N78 in Molave, Zamboanga del Sur	Molave-Dipolog Road	2014	current	
N81	71	44	N8 in Naga, Cebu	N83 / N830 in Barili, Cebu	Toledo–Pinamungahan–Aloguinsan–Mantalongon Road Cebu–Toledo Wharf Road Naga–Uling Road	2014	current	
N82	5	3	N8 in Mandaue	Dead End	A.C. Cortes Avenue (Mandaue) Mandaue–Mactan Road Pajo–Basak–Marigondon Road (Lapu-Lapu)	2014	current	Route continues into Lapu-Lapu City as an unnumbered road part of Maximo V. Patalinjug Jr. Avenue
N83	9	5	N830 in Barili	N8 in Carcar	Carcar–Barili Road	2022	current	N83 section was formerly part of N830.

==== Secondary roads ====
Route	From	To	Length	Component roads	Areas served	Notes
N100	Laoag		6.435 km (3.999 mi)	Laoag Airport Road	Ilocos Norte	Connects to Laoag International Airport
N101	Lal-lo	Aparri	28.6 km (17.8 mi)	Cagayan Valley Road	Cagayan	
N102	Camalaniugan	Santa Ana	71.82 km (44.63 mi)	Dugo–San Vicente Road (Camalaniugan–Santa Ana Road)	Cagayan	
N103	Aparri		1.583 km (0.984 mi)	Cagayan Valley Road	Cagayan	Continues as an unnumbered road towards Aparri Port
N104	Tuguegarao		2.111 km (1.312 mi)	Tuguegarao Bypass Road (Enrile Boulevard)	Cagayan	
N105	Tuguegarao		0.393 km (0.244 mi)	Tuguegarao Airport Road	Cagayan	Connects to Tuguegarao Airport
N106	Tuguegarao		3.613 km (2.245 mi)	Tuguegarao Diversion Road II	Cagayan	
N107	Tuguegarao		0.772 km (0.480 mi)	Tuguegarao Diversion Road I	Cagayan	Locally known as College Avenue and Mabini Street, respectively.
N108	Cordon	Dipaculao	109.72 km (68.18 mi)	Cordon–Diffun–Maddela–Aurora Road	Aurora, Quirino, Isabela	Meets with N1 at the northern end and N112 at the southern end
N109	Bontoc	Bagabag	104.52 km (64.95 mi)	Nueva Vizcaya–Ifugao–Mountain Province Road	Mountain Province, Ifugao, Nueva Vizcaya	Meets with N204 at the northern end Meets with N1 at the southern end
N110	Baguio	Aritao	105.67 km (65.66 mi)	Leonard Wood Road; Pacdal Road; Ambuklao Road; Benguet–Nueva Vizcaya Road	Nueva Vizcaya, Benguet	Meets with N1 in Aritao at the eastern end Meets with N54 in Baguio at the western end
N111	San Jose	Cabanatuan		Rizal–San Jose Road; Rizal–Bongabon–Aurora Road; Nueva Ecija–Aurora Road (Cabanatuan to Bongabon)	Nueva Ecija	Continues eastward as N112 at Bongabon; Continues eastward as N114 at Palayan
N112	Bongabon	Casiguran		Nueva Ecija–Aurora Road (Bongabon to San Luis); Pantabangan–Baler Road (San Luis to Baler); Baler–Casiguran Road	Aurora, Nueva Ecija	
N113	San Luis		3.318 km (2.062 mi)	Pantabangan–Baler Road (Baler Airport Road)	Aurora	Meets with N112 at the eastern terminus Connects with Baler Airport
N114	Santa Fe	Rosales	69.44 km (43.15 mi)	Pangasinan–Nueva Vizcaya Road	Pangasinan, Nueva Vizcaya	Separated by N56 (Pangasinan–Nueva Vizcaya Road and Pangasinan–Nueva Ecija Road); N1 and N111 (Pangasinan–Nueva Ecija and Palayan–Gabaldon–Dingalan Road)
N114	Rosales	Santo Domingo	46.35 km (28.80 mi)	Pangasinan–Nueva Ecija Road	Pangasinan, Nueva Ecija	Separated by N56 (Pangasinan–Nueva Vizcaya Road and Pangasinan–Nueva Ecija Road); N1 and N111 (Pangasinan–Nueva Ecija and Palayan–Gabaldon–Dingalan Road)
N114	Palayan	Dingalan	46.75 km (29.05 mi)	Palayan–Gabaldon–Dingalan Road	Aurora, Nueva Ecija	Separated by N56 (Pangasinan–Nueva Vizcaya Road and Pangasinan–Nueva Ecija Road); N1 and N111 (Pangasinan–Nueva Ecija and Palayan–Gabaldon–Dingalan Road)
N115	Calumpit	Pulilan		Pulilan Regional Road	Bulacan	
N116	Bocaue	Plaridel		Fortunato Halili Avenue; Santa Maria Bypass Road; Norzagaray–Santa Maria Road; Alejo Santos Highway	Bulacan	
N117	Meycauayan			Malhacan Road	Bulacan	Connects to E1 and N1
N118	Valenzuela	Quezon City	9.01 km (5.60 mi)	Maysan Road; General Luis Street	Valenzuela, Caloocan, Quezon City	
N119	Lal-lo	Santa Teresita	33.123 km (20.582 mi)	Magapit–Santa Teresita Road	Cagayan	Connects to N1 and N102
N120	Caloocan	Pasay		Samson Road Gen. San Miguel Street; C-4 Road; Mel Lopez Boulevard; Bonifacio Drive; Roxas Boulevard (Padre Burgos Avenue to EDSA)	Caloocan, Malabon, Navotas, Manila, Pasay	Spur of Pan-Philippine Highway (AH26)
N121	Abulug	Aparri		Abulug–Ballesteros–Aparri Road	Cagayan	Added and construction ended in 2017
N122	Laoag	Currimao		Rodolfo G. Fariñas Bypass Road; Laoag–Balaccad Road; Pias–Currimao–Balaccad Road	Ilocos Norte	
N127	Quezon City	Norzagaray	36.6 km (22.7 mi)	Quirino Highway	Quezon City, Caloocan, Bulacan	
N128	Valenzuela	Quezon City	5.2 km (3.2 mi)	Mindanao Avenue	Caloocan, Valenzuela, Quezon City	
N129	Quezon City			Congressional Avenue; Luzon Avenue; Tandang Sora Avenue (Luzon Avenue to Magsaysay & Katipunan Avenues); Katipunan Avenue	Quezon City	
N130	Quezon City	Navotas		Gregorio Araneta Avenue (Quezon City segment only); Sergeant Rivera Avenue; 5th Avenue; C-3 Road	Quezon City, Caloocan, Navotas	Starts at N180 in Quezon City
N140	Tondo, Manila	Malate, Manila	10.0 km (6.2 mi)	Capulong Street; Tayuman Street; Lacson Avenue (Tayuman to Nagtahan); Nagtahan Street; Quirino Avenue	Manila	Follows the Circumferential Road 2
N141	Paco, Manila	Pasig		Tomas Claudio Street; Valenzuela Street (Tomas Claudio St. to V. Mapa St.); Victorino Mapa Street; P. Sanchez Street; Shaw Boulevard; Pasig Boulevard; Eulogio Rodriguez Jr. Avenue (Bagong Ilog segment)	Manila, Mandaluyong, Pasig	Includes the at-grade portion or service road of Eulogio Rodriguez Jr. Avenue (C-5) below the Bagong Ilog Flyover in Pasig. Terminates at N11. It also follows the western segment of Radial Road 5.
N142	Pasig	Muntinlupa		Pasig Boulevard Extension; Dr. Sixto Antonio Avenue (C. Raymundo Ave. to Caruncho Ave.); A. Mabini Street; A. Luna Street (Pasig); Ramon Jabson Street; M. Almeda Street; General Luna Street (Taguig–Pateros boundary to Tuktukan); M. L. Quezon Street; Montillano Street	Pasig, Pateros, Taguig, Muntinlupa	
N143	Taguig		1.526 km (0.948 mi)	General Santos Avenue	Taguig	Continues to Parañaque as Doña Soledad Avenue
N144	Muntinlupa		880 m (0.55 mi)	Meralco Road	Muntinlupa	Continues to the west as Dr. Santos Avenue
N145	Paco, Manila	Makati		Osmeña Highway	Manila, Makati	Non-tolled segment of South Luzon Expressway north of Magallanes Interchange; also known as South Superhighway.
N145	Tondo, Manila	Sampaloc, Manila	3.28 km (2.04 mi)	Recto Avenue	Manila	
N150	Caloocan	Ermita, Manila		Rizal Avenue; Ronquillo Street (Rizal Avenue to Plaza Santa Cruz Road); Carriedo Street (Rizal Avenue to MacArthur Bridge); Plaza Santa Cruz Road	Caloocan, Manila	
N151	Tondo, Manila		2.93 km (1.82 mi)	Abad Santos Avenue	Manila	
N155	Ermita, Manila		857 m (0.533 mi)	Kalaw Avenue	Manila	N155 covers Kalaw Avenue between Roxas Boulevard and Taft Avenue only.
N156	Ermita, Manila	Paco, Manila	2.605 km (1.619 mi)	United Nations Avenue; Quirino Avenue Extension	Manila	
N160	Caloocan and Malabon	Santa Cruz, Manila		North Luzon Expressway (untolled segment); Andres Bonifacio Avenue; Blumentritt Road (Rizal Avenue to Bonifacio Avenue)	Caloocan, Malabon, Quezon City, Manila	
N161	Santa Cruz, Manila	Sampaloc, Manila	1.614 km (1.003 mi)	Blumentritt Road (A. Bonifacio Avenue to España Boulevard)	Manila, Quezon City	
N162	Santa Cruz and Sampaloc, Manila		1.311 km (0.815 mi)	Dimasalang Street	Manila	
N170	Quezon City	Pasay		Commonwealth Avenue; Elliptical Road; Quezon Avenue; España Boulevard; Lerma Street; Quezon Boulevard; Padre Burgos Avenue (Quezon Bridge to Liwasang Bonifacio); Taft Avenue	Quezon City, Manila, Pasay	
N171	Quezon City		2.056 km (1.278 mi)	West Avenue	Quezon City	
N172	Quezon City		2.04 km (1.27 mi)	Timog Avenue	Quezon City	
N173	Quezon City		1.772 km (1.101 mi)	North Avenue	Quezon City	
N174	Quezon City			East Avenue	Quezon City	
N175	Quezon City		1.178 km (0.732 mi)	University Avenue	Quezon City	Access to University of the Philippines Diliman campus
N180	Manila	Quezon City		Padre Burgos Avenue; Finance Drive; Ayala Boulevard; P. Casal Street; Legarda Street; Magsaysay Boulevard; Aurora Boulevard (west of EDSA)	Manila, San Juan, Quezon City	Terminates at EDSA; Aurora Boulevard continues as N59 eastward
N183	Santa Mesa, Manila		317 m (0.197 mi)	Victorino Mapa Street	Manila	Terminates at the intersection of Valenzuela Street, continues as N141
N184	Quezon City	Mandaluyong	4.116 km (2.558 mi)	Gilmore Avenue (Aurora Boulevard to N. Domingo Street); Granada Street; Ortigas Avenue (Bonny Serrano Avenue to EDSA)	Quezon City, San Juan, Mandaluyong	Terminates at EDSA, continues as N60 eastward to Rizal. Includes Ortigas Interchange's flyover connecting EDSA northbound and Ortigas Avenue westbound.
N185	Quezon City		3.2 km (2.0 mi)	Bonny Serrano Avenue	Quezon City, San Juan	Ortigas Avenue to Katipunan Avenue segment only
N190	Pasay	Pasig		Gil Puyat Avenue; Kalayaan Avenue (eastern Makati–Taguig segment); San Guillermo Avenue	Pasay, Makati, Taguig, Pasig	
N191	Makati	Taguig		Kalayaan Flyover	Makati, Taguig	
N192	Parañaque	Pasay		Andrews Avenue; Lawton Avenue	Parañaque, Pasay	
N193	Pasay		1.171 km (0.728 mi)	Domestic Road	Pasay	
N194	Parañaque	Pasay		NAIA Road	Parañaque, Pasay	Connects to Ninoy Aquino International Airport
N200	Currimao			Gaang Wharf Road	Ilocos Norte	
N201	Cabugao	Cabugao		Salomague Port Road	Ilocos Sur	
N202	Bantay	Vigan		Bantay–Vigan Road; Vigan Airport Road	Ilocos Sur	
N203	Narvacan			Sulvec Port Road	Ilocos Sur	
N204	Baguio	Narvacan	388.06 km (241.13 mi)	Magsaysay Avenue; Halsema Highway; Mountain Province–Cagayan Road via Tabuk–Enrile (Bontoc to Pasil); Kalinga–Abra Road; Ilocos Sur–Abra Road	Benguet, Mountain Province, Kalinga, Abra, Ilocos Sur	
N205	Tagudin	Sabangan	97.25 km (60.43 mi)	Tagudin–Cervantes–Sabangan Road	Ilocos Sur, Mountain Province	Western end meets with N2, eastern end meets with N204
N206	Bontoc	Sagada	13.64 km (8.48 mi)	Rev. John A. Staunton Road; Sagada South Road	Mountain Province	Ends at Sumaguing Cave in Sagada, Dantay Junction in Bontoc
N207	Buguias	Bokod	64.77 km (40.25 mi)	Cong. Andres Acop Cosalan Road (Gurel–Bokod–Kabayan–Buguias–Abatan Road)	Benguet	
N208	Agoo	Baguio		Aspiras–Palispis Highway	La Union, Benguet	
N209	Rosario	Pugo		Pugo–Rosario Road; Estacio Street; Bernal Street; Posadas Street	La Union	Segment of Pugo–Rosario Road bypassing the town proper of Rosario, which is from Estacio Street to N2 (MacArthur Highway), is not part of N209.
N210	Mangaldan	Binalonan		Binalonan–Dagupan Highway	Pangasinan	Continues as N55 at Mangaldan
N211	Villasis	San Carlos		Villasis–Malasiqui Road; Malasiqui–San Carlos Road	Pangasinan	
N212	Rosales	Bayambang		Carmen–Alcala Road; Alcala–Bayambang Road	Pangasinan	
N213	Mabalacat	Capas	23.07 km (14.34 mi)	Gil Puyat Avenue; Mabalacat–Magalang Road; Magalang–Concepcion Road; Capas–Concepcion Provincial Road	Pampanga, Tarlac	Connects from MacArthur Highway in Mabalacat via E1 at Santa Ines Exit (NLEx) and Concepcion Exit (SCTEx) to MacArthur Highway in Capas.
N214	Floridablanca	Dinalupihan		Angeles–Porac–Floridablanca–Dinalupihan Road; Tabacan Poblacion Road	Bataan, Pampanga	Continues as N217 at Bodega, Floridablanca
N215	Mabalacat	Mabalacat	1.665 km (1.035 mi)	Dau Access Road	Pampanga	Connects to E1 via Dau Exit
N216	Angeles City	San Fernando	8.996 km (5.590 mi)	Filipino-American Friendship Highway	Pampanga	
N217	Angeles City	Dinalupihan		Henson Street; Santo Rosario Street; Angeles–Porac–Floridablanca–Dinalupihan Road	Pampanga, Bataan	
N218	San Fernando			Pennsylvania Avenue (San Fernando Port Road)	La Union	
N219	San Fernando			San Vicente Road	La Union	Connects to San Fernando Airport
N221	San Fernando			San Fernando Airport Road	La Union	Connects to San Fernando Airport
N222	Bontoc	Kabugao		Mountain Province Boundary–Calanan–Pinukpuk–Abbut Road (Pasil to Abbut segment); Conner–Pinukpuk Road; Abbut–Conner Road; Conner–Kabugao Road	Mountain Province, Kalinga, Apayao, Cagayan	
N223	Abulug	Kabugao		Kabugao–Pudtol–Luna–Cagayan Boundary Road	Apayao, Cagayan	
N224	Banaue	Ramon		Banaue–Mayaoyao–Alfonso Lista–Isabela Road; Potia Road	Ifugao, Isabela	
N231	Baguio			Shanum Street; Session Road; Loakan Road	Benguet	
N232	Baguio			Major Mane Road; Philippine Military Academy Road	Benguet	Meets with N231
N233	Baguio			Asin Circumferential Road; Bakakeng Central Road 3 Wakat–Suello Road; Western Link Circumferential Road	Benguet	
N234	Baguio		14.0 km (8.7 mi)	Asin–Nangalisan–San Pascual Road	Benguet	Intersects with N233
N241	San Carlos	San Fabian		San Carlos–Calasiao Road; San Miguel Road; Calasiao–Dagupan Road; San Fabian–Bonuan–Dagupan Diversion Road	Pangasinan	
N242	Paniqui	Mangaldan		Paniqui–Camiling Road; Zamora Street; Camiling–Malasiqui–Santa Barbara Road; Old Santa Barbara Road; Santa Barbara–Mangaldan Road	Pangasinan, Tarlac	
N243	Bayambang	Binmaley		Binmaley–San Carlos Road; San Carlos–Basista–Bayambang Road	Pangasinan	
N247	Balagtas	San Rafael	22.123 km (13.747 mi)	Plaridel Bypass Road	Bulacan	
N301	Dinalupihan	Mariveles	61.97 km (38.51 mi)	Roman Superhighway; Mariveles–Talaga Bay Road	Bataan	
N302	Labrador	Labrador		Labrador Diversion Road	Pangasinan	Both marked as N302
N302	Morong	Pilar		Gov. Joaquin J. Linao Road	Bataan	Both marked as N302
N303	Orion	Limay	6.375 km (3.961 mi)	Bataan National Road	Bataan	Connects to N301 on both ends
N305	Olongapo		1.70 km (1.10 mi)	Rizal Avenue; Magsaysay Drive	Zambales	Connects to Olongapo Gapan Road (N305) on Northern Part, N306 on Center Part of Rizal Avenue and lead to Subic Bay Freeport Main Gate on the Southern Part.
N306	Olongapo	Bugallon		Olongapo–Bugallon Road	Zambales, Pangasinan	From N305 on Southern Part which connect to Olongapo to N307 which connect to Alaminos and Bugallon, Pangasinan.
N307	Alaminos	Bolinao		Alaminos–Lucap Road; San Jose Drive; Alaminos–Bani Road; Regional Highway 5 (Bani to Bolinao)	Pangasinan	
N308	Tarlac	La Paz		Central Luzon Link Expressway	Tarlac	Untolled section only and partially on par with expressway.
N401	Noveleta	General Trias		Marseilla Street; General Trias Drive	Cavite	
N402	Tanza	Tagaytay	49.42 km (30.71 mi)	Santa Cruz Street; San Agustin Street; Antero Soriano Highway; Sabang Road; J. Poblete Street; Capt. C. Nazareno Street; Naic–Indang Road; Indang–Mendez Road; Mendez–Tagaytay Road	Cavite	Also known as Tanza–Naic-Indang-Mendez–Tagaytay Road
N403	Naic	Trece Martires	12.55 km (7.80 mi)	Governor's Drive	Cavite	Naic–Trece Martires segment only, continues eastward as N65, westward to Ternate as N405
N404	Trece Martires	Indang	12.015 km (7.466 mi)	Trece Martires–Indang Road	Cavite	
N405	Naic	Ternate	24.19 km (15.03 mi)	Governor's Drive; Caylabne Road	Cavite	
N406	Maragondon	Alfonso	37.97 km (23.59 mi)	Maragondon–Magallanes–Amuyong Road	Cavite	
N407	Calaca	Ternate	62.19 km (38.64 mi)	Tagaytay–Nasugbu Highway (Calaca to Nasugbu); Ternate–Nasugbu Road	Batangas, Cavite	Also known as J.P. Laurel Street through the Nasugbu town proper
N408	Nasugbu	Calatagan		Nasugbu–Lian–Calatagan Road	Batangas	Also known as J.P. Rizal Street from Nasugbu to Lian and Zobel Highway from N409 (Balibago–Balayan Road) in Lian to Calatagan
N409	Lian	Balayan		Balibago–Balayan Road	Batangas	
N410	Dasmariñas	Lemery	56.839 km (35.318 mi)	Aguinaldo Highway (Dasmariñas-Silang border to Tagaytay)Tagaytay–Nasugbu Highway (Tagaytay to Calaca); Diokno Highway	Cavite, Batangas	Terminates at N436 in Lemery, Batangas
N411	Bacoor	Muntinlupa	10.9 km (6.8 mi)	Alabang–Zapote Road	Cavite, Metro Manila	
N413	Tagaytay		2.53 km (1.57 mi)	Mahogany Avenue	Cavite	
N419	Bacoor	Dasmariñas	21.39 km (13.29 mi)	Aguinaldo Highway (Bacoor to Dasmariñas-Silang border)	Cavite	Continues north of Tirona Highway in Bacoor as N62 and south of Dasmariñas–Silang boundary as N410
N420	Santa Rosa	Tagaytay	23.245 km (14.444 mi)	Santa Rosa–Tagaytay Road	Laguna, Cavite	
N421	Tanauan	Tagaytay	28.049 km (17.429 mi)	Mabini Avenue; Tanauan–Talisay–Tagaytay Road (Tanauan to Talisay); Ligaya Drive; Tagaytay–Calamba Road (Tagaytay segment only)	Batangas, Cavite	
N422	Rosario	Lucena	51.233 km (31.835 mi)	Rosario-San Juan Road; Quezon Eco-Tourism Road	Batangas, Quezon	Quezon segment added in 2017. Excludes a portion of San Juan–Candelaria Road between the two roads in Sariaya.
N431	Lipa	Padre Garcia	8.926 km (5.546 mi)	Manila–Batangas Poblacion Road; Lipa–Rosario Road (Lipa–Padre Garcia segment)	Batangas	
N432	Lipa		1.903 km (1.182 mi)	Fernando Airbase Road	Batangas	Connects the Basilio Fernando Air Base
N433	Lipa	San Luis/Alitagtag	17.180 km (10.675 mi)	Banaybanay–Mojon–Cuenca Road	Batangas	
N434	Batangas City			Batangas Port Diversion Road; Bolboc Access Road	Batangas	Connects to E2 at the north end, Batangas Port at the south end.
N435	Batangas City	Tiaong	39.81 km (24.74 mi)	Batangas–Quezon Road	Batangas, Quezon	Includes the 135-meter (443 ft) segment bypassing the Padre Garcia junction. Segment from Rosario to Padre Garcia is also known as Lipa–Rosario Road.
N436	Tuy	Batangas City	60.37 km (37.51 mi)	Palico–Balayan–Batangas Road	Batangas	Starts at Palico Rotunda with N437 (P. Burgos Street) and N4 (Jose P. Laurel Highway) in Batangas City. Includes section passing through Tuy Town Proper (J.P. Rizal Street) and through Barangay Gimalas, Balayan, Batangas.
N437	Batangas City		2.57 km (1.60 mi)	Manila–Batangas Pier Road	Batangas	Connects Batangas City proper to Batangas Port. Also known as P. Burgos Street from N4 to Rizal Avenue, Rizal Avenue segment up to Santa Clara, and Santa Clara Ilaya up to Batangas Port.
N438	Batangas City	Lobo	33.78 km (20.99 mi)	Batangas–Lobo Road	Batangas	Starts at N4 as a segment of Tolentino Road before turning west as Gov. Antonio Carpio Road.
N439	Batangas City	Lobo	52.079 km (32.360 mi)	Batangas–Tabangao–Lobo Road; Lobo–Malabrigo–San Juan Road (Lobo segment)	Batangas	Runs along the shore of Batangas province
N450	Abra de Ilog	San Jose		Mindoro West Coastal Road	Occidental Mindoro	
N451	Mamburao	Mamburao		Mamburao Airport Road	Occidental Mindoro	Connects to Mamburao Airport
N451	San Jose			Bubog Road	Occidental Mindoro	Connects to San Jose Airport
N452	Puerto Galera	Magsaysay		Calapan North Road; Calapan South Road; Mindoro East Coastal Road	Occidental Mindoro, Oriental Mindoro	
N453	San Jose			San Jose–Caminawit Port Road	Occidental Mindoro	Connects to Caminawit Port
N454	Bongabong	Roxas		Bongabong–Sagana–Roxas–San Aquilino Road	Oriental Mindoro	
N455	Calapan			Calapan Airport Road; PC Barracks Road	Oriental Mindoro	Connects to Calapan Airport and Pier
N460	Marinduque			Marinduque Circumferential Road	Marinduque	Road traverses around the whole island, kilometer zero located at Boac
N461	Mogpog			Mogpog–Balanacan Port Road	Marinduque	Connects to Balanacan Port
N462	Gasan			Masiga Airport Road	Marinduque	Connects to Marinduque Airport
N470	Tablas Island			Tablas Circumferential Road	Romblon	Road traverses around the whole island, kilometer zero located at Odiongan
N475	Romblon Island			Romblon Port Road; Romblon–Cogon–Sablayan Road	Romblon	North end connects to Romblon Port
N480	Sibuyan Island			Sibuyan Circumferential Road	Romblon	Road traverses around the whole island, kilometer zero located at Cajidiocan
N490	El Nido	Bataraza, Rizal		New Ibahay Road; Puerto Princesa North Road; Roxas Diversion Road; Puerto Princesa South Road; Palawan Circumferential Road	Palawan	
N491	Puerto Princesa			Capitol–Canigaran Road; Puerto Princesa South Road	Palawan	Puerto Princesa South Road continues as N490
N492	Puerto Princesa			Irawan–Tagburos Road	Palawan	
N493	Sofronio Española	Quezon		Abo-abo–Quezon Road	Palawan	
N494	Puerto Princesa	Aborlan		Napsan–Apurawan Road; Aramaywan–Berong–Puerto Princesa Road; Quezon–Aramaywan Road; Quezon–Punta Baja Road; Palawan Circumferential Road (Panalingaan–Tagbita–Latud)	Palawan	
N495	Rizal	Bataraza		Culandanum–Panalingaan Cross Country Road	Palawan	
N501	Nabas	Iloilo City	303 km (188 mi)	Ibajay–Antique Boundary Road; Iloilo–Antique Road (Pandan to Sibalom & Hamtic to Iloilo City)	Aklan, Antique, Iloilo	
N502	Nabas	Pandan	77 km (48 mi)	Aklan West Road (Nabas–Buruanga segment); Pandan–Libertad–Aklan Boundary Road	Aklan, Antique	
N503	Nabas	Roxas	120 km (75 mi)	Aklan West Road (Nabas-Kalibo segment); Aklan East Road; Capiz–Aklan Road; Roxas–Cagay–Sibaguan–Balijuagan–Cudian–Ivisan Road	Aklan, Capiz	
N504	Kalibo	New Washington	19 km (12 mi)	Jaime Cardinal Sin Avenue	Aklan	
N505	Roxas	Barotac Viejo		Iloilo East Coast–Capiz Road; Old Iloilo–Capiz Road	Capiz, Iloilo	Continues from Barotac Viejo as N508
N506	Cuartero	Pontevedra	31 km (19 mi)	Cuartero–Tapulang–Maayon Road; Maayon–Bailan Road	Capiz	
N507	Balasan	Estancia	9.2 km (5.7 mi)	Iloilo East Coast–Estancia Wharf Road	Iloilo	
N508	Barotac Viejo	Zarraga		Iloilo East Coast–Capiz Road (Barotac Viejo to Zarraga)	Iloilo	
N509	Iloilo City	Dumangas	23 km (14 mi)	Iloilo–Leganes–Dumangas Coastal Road	Iloilo	
N510	Passi	Sara	49 km (30 mi)	Passi–San Rafael–Lemery–Sara Road	Iloilo	
N512	Iloilo City	Passi		Old Iloilo–Capiz Road (Iloilo City to Calinog); Passi–Calinog Road; Senator Benigno S. Aquino Jr. Avenue	Iloilo	
N513	Iloilo	Santa Barbara		Senator Benigno S. Aquino Jr. Avenue; Santa Barbara Bypass Road	Iloilo	
N514	Santa Barbara	Zarraga		Leganes–Santa Barbara Road (Santa Barbara Poblacion–Old Iloilo–Capiz Road); New Lucena–Santa Barbara Road; Cabatuan–New Lucena–Banga-Bante Road	Iloilo	
N515	Iloilo			Senator Benigno S. Aquino Jr. Avenue	Iloilo	
N521	Sibalom	San Jose de Buenavista		Bantayan–San Pedro–Cubay Road	Antique	
N522	San Jose de Buenavista			San Jose Airport Road	Antique	Connects to Evelio Javier Airport
N523	San Jose de Buenavista			San Jose Port Road	Antique	Connects to San Jose Port
N525	San Joaquin	Tobias Fornier		Tiolas–Sinugbuhan Road; Anini-y–Tobias Fornier Road	Antique, Iloilo	
N532	Iloilo			Iznart–Ledesma–Molo Road; JM Basa–General Hughes Port–San Pedro Road	Iloilo	Connects to Iloilo Port in Muelle Loney
N540	Guimaras		110.65 km (68.75 mi)	Guimaras Circumferential Road	Guimaras	Circles the whole island, kilometer zero at Alibhon
N541	Jordan		1.4 km (0.87 mi)	Rizal–Jordan Wharf Road	Guimaras	Connects to Jordan Port
N542	Jordan	San Lorenzo	15 km (9.3 mi)	San Miguel–Constancia–Cabano–Igcawayan Road	Guimaras	
N600	Antipolo			Sen. L. Sumulong Memorial Circle	Rizal	Also known as Antipolo Circumferential Road; intersects with N59 (Sumulong Highway) on the northwestern loop and N60 (Ortigas Avenue Extension) at the western loop
N601	Cainta	Infanta		Manila East Road (Cainta–Famy segment); Famy–Real–Infanta–Dinahican Port Road	Rizal, Quezon, Laguna	Connects to N60 at the northern end, N602 at Famy
N602	Famy	Pagsanjan		Manila East Road	Laguna	Segment from Famy to Pagsanjan only.
N603	Pagsanjan	Lucena		Pagsanjan–Cavinti Road; Cavinti–Luisiana Road; Luisiana–Lucban Road; Lucban–Tayabas Road; Tayabas–Lucena Road; Lucena Cotta Port Road	Laguna, Quezon	Name varies within the poblacions of Pagsanjan, Luisiana, Lucban, Tayabas, and Lucena
N604	Lucban	Mauban	42.286 km (26.275 mi)	Lucban–Sampaloc–Mauban Road; Mauban–Real Road (Mauban segment only)	Quezon	Alternative name varies according to segments and within Mauban town proper
N605	Tayabas	Mauban		Tayabas–Mauban Road	Quezon	Also known as Tayabas–Mainit–Mauban Road
N606	Tayabas	Pagbilao	10.078 km (6.262 mi)	Old Manila South Road	Quezon	Also known as Gomez Street and M.L. Tagarao Street in Lucena poblacion. Old alignment of Manila South Road prior to the completion of Lucena Diversion Road (N1/AH26). Split into two segments by N603.
N606	Sariaya	Lucena	7.51 km (4.67 mi)	Sariaya Bypass Road	Quezon	
N607	Lucena		4.305 km (2.675 mi)	Dalahican Road	Quezon	Connects the city proper of Lucena with Dalahican Port
N608	Tiaong			Tiaong Bypass Road	Quezon	Added in 2017. Connected to N1/AH26 on both sides.
N609	Candelaria			Candelaria Diversion Road	Quezon	Added in 2017. Connected to N1/AH26 on both sides.
N610	Pagbilao	San Francisco		Pagbilao–Padre Burgos Road; Padre Burgos–Pototanin Junction Road; Gumaca–Pitogo–Mulanay–San Narciso Road (Pitogo–Mulanay segment); Mulanay–San Francisco Road; San Francisco–San Andres Road (San Francisco segment only)	Quezon	
N612	Lopez	San Andres		Lopez–Buenavista Road; Gumaca–Pitogo–Mulanay–San Narciso Road (San Narciso segment); San Narciso–San Andres Road	Quezon	
N613	Gumaca	Pitogo		Gumaca–Pitogo–Mulanay–San Narciso Road (Gumaca–Pitogo segment)	Quezon	
N614	Mulanay	San Narciso		Mulanay–San Narciso Road	Quezon	
N615	San Narciso	San Narciso		San Narciso Poblacion Road	Quezon	
N620	Labo	Jose Panganiban		Talobatib–Jose Panganiban Poblacion–Port Road	Camarines Norte	
N621	Daet		4.375 km (2.718 mi)	Tagas–Daet Poblacion–Magang Road	Camarines Norte	
N622	Daet		4.34 km (2.70 mi)	Daet Airport Road	Camarines Norte	Connects to Daet Airport
N623	Pamplona	Pasacao		Danao–Pasacao Road	Camarines Sur	
N630	Legazpi	Pili		Pili–Tigaon–Albay Boundary Road; Legazpi–Sto Domingo–Tabaco–Camarines Sur Boundary Road	Albay, Camarines Sur	
N631	Lagonoy	Caramoan		Lagonoy–Presentacion Road; Presentacion–Maligaya Road; Tigaon–Goa–San Jose–Lagonoy–Guijalo via San Vicente Road	Camarines Sur	
N632	Sagñay	Sagñay		Sagñay–Nato Road	Camarines Sur	
N633	Ocampo	Iriga		Iriga–Sagrada–San Ramon–Hanawan Road	Camarines Sur	
N634	Baao	Nabua		Baao–Iriga–Nabua Road	Camarines Sur	
N635	Iriga	Bato		Iriga–Masoli Road	Camarines Sur	
N636	Ligao	Tabaco		Ligao–Tabaco Road	Albay	
N637	Tabaco	Tabaco		Tabaco Wharf Road	Albay	
N638	Polangui	Pio Duran		Albay West Coast Road; Matacon–Libon–Polangui Junction Road	Albay	
N639	Ligao	Pio Duran		Ligao–Pio Duran Rd	Albay	
N639	Legazpi			Camp Bagong Ibalon Road	Albay	
N640	Legazpi	Manito		Legazpi–Punta de Jesus Road	Albay	
N641	Legazpi	Castilla		Banquerohan–Bariis–Sogoy–Sorsogon Boundary Road	Albay, Sorsogon	
N642	Pilar	Pilar		Putiao Junction–Pilar–Donsol Road (Pilar segment only)	Sorsogon	
N643	Sorsogon			Sorsogon Diversion Road	Sorsogon	
N644	Sorsogon			Bacon–Manito Road	Sorsogon	
N645	Bulan			Bulan–Magallanes Road	Sorsogon	Terminates in Bulan Airport
N646	Bulan			Bulan Seaport Road	Sorsogon	Connects to Bulan Seaport
N647	Legazpi			Quezon Avenue–Wharf Road	Albay	
N648	Lucena			Lucena Airport Road	Quezon	
N649	Legazpi			Lakandula Drive; Legazpi Airport Road	Albay	Connects to Legazpi Airport
N650	Catanduanes			Catanduanes Circumferential Road	Catanduanes	Road traverses around the whole island, Kilometer zero located at Virac
N651	Carmona			Carmona Diversion Road	Cavite	
N651	Panganiban	Caramoran	26.17 km (16.26 mi)	Panganiban–Sabloyon Rd	Catanduanes	Connects to N650
N652	Virac			Virac Airport Road	Catanduanes	Connects to Virac Airport
N653	Virac			Virac Port Road	Catanduanes	Connects to Virac Port
N654	Uson	Cawayan		Buenavista–Cawayan Rd	Masbate	
N655	Barotac Nuevo	Dumangas	12.6 km (7.8 mi)	Barotac Nuevo–Dumangas–Dacutan Wharf Road	Iloilo	As seen in Dumganas, the road is mistakenly numbered as N508.
N656	Santa Teresita		1.684 km (1.046 mi)	Sta. Teresita–Alitagtag Diversion Road	Batangas	
N657	Lopez			Lopez–Hondagua Port Road	Quezon	Connects Brgy. Hondagua to N1
N658	Legazpi			Legazpi Access Road	Albay	
N660	Monreal	Batuan		San Fernando North Road; San Fernando South Road	Masbate	Ticao Island route
N661	Masbate			Moises R. Espinosa Airport Road	Masbate	Connects to Moises R. Espinosa Airport
N662	Masbate	Placer		Capitol–Cadre Road; Masbate–Cataingan–Placer Road	Masbate	
N663	Milagros	Baleno		Junction Milagros–Baleno–Lagta Road; Lagta–Crossing Malinta Road	Masbate	
N664	Masbate	Milagros		Masbate–Milagros Road	Masbate	
N665	Milagros	Balud		Balud Road	Masbate	
N666	Mandaon			Mandaon Road	Masbate	
N670	Allen	Santa Rita		Allen–Catarman Road; Catarman–Laoang Road; Laoang–Calomotan Road; San Policarpo–Arteche–Lapinig Road; Pangpang–Palapag–Mapanas–Gamay–Lapinig RoadBuenavista–Lawaan–Marabut Road; Taft–Oras–San Policarpo–Arteche Road; Wright–Taft–Borongan Road; Borongan–Guiuan Road; Basey–Marabut–Pinamitinan Road; Dolongan–Basey Road; San Juanico–Basey–Sohoton Road	Northern Samar, Eastern Samar, Samar	Encompasses all but the western side of Samar Island, where the route is marked as N1
N671	Catarman			Catarman Airport Road	Northern Samar	Connects to Catarman National Airport
N672	Catarman	Calbayog		Catarman Cadre Road Calbayog–Catarman Road	Northern Samar, Samar	
N672	Pili			Pili Airport Road	Camarines Sur	Connects to Naga Airport
N673	Pili			Pili Diversion Road	Camarines Sur	Both routes marked as N673.
N673	Calbayog			Old Calbayog National Route	Samar	Both routes marked as N673.
N674	Taft	Paranas		Wright–Taft–Borongan Road	Eastern Samar, Samar	
N675	Catbalogan			Buri Access Road	Samar	Connects to Catbalogan Airport in Buri Island
N676	Quinapondan	Guiuan		Borongan–Guiuan Rd	Eastern Samar	
N677	Gandara			Gandara Diversion Road	Samar	Added in 2017. Upgraded from tertiary status.
N680	Biliran			Biliran Circumferential Road	Biliran	Circles the entire island, starts from Biliran municipality
N681	Capoocan	Biliran		Lemon–Leyte–Biliran Road	Leyte, Biliran	
N682	Naval	Caibiran		Naval–Caibiran Cross Country Road	Biliran	
N683	Ormoc			Dayhagan–Salvacion–Coob–Libertad Road	Leyte	Connects to Ormoc Airport
N684	Leyte	Ormoc		Sambulawan Junction–Calaguise–Calubian Road; Calubian Junction–San Isidro–Tabango–Villaba–Palompon Road; Palompon–Isabel–Mérida–Ormoc Road	Leyte	
N686	Tacloban	Palo		Government Center Road Network; Rizal Avenida Extension Road; Rizal Avenue; Trece Martirez Street; Magsaysay Boulevard; Tacloban–Baybay South Road	Leyte	
N687	Tacloban			Governor Benjamin T. Romualdez Diversion Road; Picas–San Jose DZR Airport Road	Leyte	Connects to Daniel Z. Romualdez Airport
N690	Abuyog	Liloan		Abuyog–Silago Road; Junction Himay-angan–Silago–Abuyog Boundary Road	Leyte, Southern Leyte	
N691	Liloan	San Ricardo		Liloan–San Ricardo Road	Southern Leyte	
N692	Sogod	Baybay		Boundary Southern Leyte–Maasin–Macrohon–Sogod–Junction Daang Maharlika; Ormoc–Baybay–Southern Leyte Boundary Road (Baybay to Maasin)	Leyte, Southern Leyte	
N693	Bato	Bontoc		Bato–Bontoc Road	Leyte, Southern Leyte	
N695	Maasin			Junction Panaw-awan Airport Road	Southern Leyte	Connects to Maasin Airport
N701	Bacolod		16.381 km (10.179 mi)	Bacolod Circumferential Road	Negros Occidental	
N702	Bacolod		5.494 km (3.414 mi)	Bacolod Circumferential Road; Santo Niño–Banago Road (San Juan Street)	Negros Occidental	
N703	Silay		7.554 km (4.694 mi)	J. Pitong Ledesma Road (Silay–Lantawan Road)	Negros Occidental	Ends at the intersection with N716
N704	Sagay	Calatrava	38 km (24 mi)	AE Marañon Street	Negros Occidental	Connects to N708 going to Calatrava
N705	Sagay		6.8 km (4.2 mi)	Western Nautical Highway–Vito	Negros Occidental	
N706	Escalante		6.991 km (4.344 mi)	East Avenue–Danao Port	Negros Occidental	Ends at the intersection with N707
N707	Escalante		1.733 km (1.077 mi)	Danao Port Road	Negros Occidental	Connects to Danao Port
N708	Don Salvador Benedicto	Calatrava	41 km (25 mi)	Negros Occidental Eco-Tourism Highway–Calatrava	Negros Occidental	
N709	Vallehermoso	La Castellana	49 km (30 mi)	Vallehermoso–Canlaon–La Castellana Road	Negros Oriental, Negros Occidental	
N710	San Enrique	Hinigaran	61.934 km (38.484 mi)	Pontevedra Bypass Road; Junction Bagonawa–La Castellana–Isabela Road; Binalbagan–Isabela Road (Isabela segment only); Hinigaran–Isabela Road	Negros Occidental	
N711	Santa Catalina	Tanjay	49 km (30 mi)	Santa Catalina–Pamplona–Tanjay Road	Negros Oriental	
N712	Bayawan	Kabankalan	152 km (94 mi)	Dumaguete South Road (Bayawan to Basay); Bacolod South Road (Hinoba-an to Kabankalan)	Negros Oriental, Negros Occidental	
N713	Pulupandan		4.7 km (2.9 mi)	Pulupandan Pier Road	Negros Occidental	Connects to Pulupandan Port
N714	Dumaguete		0.458 km (0.285 mi)	Dumaguete Port Road	Negros Oriental	Connects to Dumaguete Port
N715	Dumaguete	Sibulan	2.552 km (1.586 mi)	Dumaguete Airport Road	Negros Oriental	Connects to Sibulan (Dumaguete) Airport
N716	Bacolod	Silay	10 km (6.2 mi)	Bacolod–Silay Airport Access Road	Negros Occidental	Connects to Bacolod–Silay International Airport
N717	Bayawan	Kabankalan	98.563 km (61.244 mi)	Bayawan–Kabankalan Road	Negros Oriental, Negros Occidental	
N810	San Remigio	Danao	76 km (47 mi)	Cebu North Hagnaya Wharf Road	Cebu	Connects to Hagnaya Port
N815	Cebu	Balamban	48.1 km (29.9 mi)	Cebu–Balamban Transcentral Highway 8th Street Salinas Drive Juan Luna Avenue	Cebu	
N816	Cebu		2.00 km (1.24 mi)	Camp Lapu-Lapu Road	Cebu	Serves as Camp Lapu-Lapu's internal road and is not signposted due to not having kilometers.
N820	San Remigio	Barili	131.66 km (81.81 mi)	Antonio Y. De Pio Highway; Toledo–Tabuelan–San Remigio Road; Toledo–Pinamungahan–Aloguinsan–Mantalongon Road	Cebu	
N820	Toledo	Talisay	25.51 km (15.85 mi)	Cebu–Toledo Wharf Road (Naga to Uling)	Cebu	
N826	Toledo		0.12 km (0.075 mi)	Cebu–Toledo Wharf Road (Uling to Toledo Wharf)	Cebu	Connects to Toledo Port
N830	Carcar	Santander	107.83 km (67.00 mi)	Carcar–Barili–Mantayupan Road; Santander–Barili–Toledo Road; Natalio Bacalso Avenue	Cebu	
N840	Talisay	Liloan	28.6 km (17.8 mi)	Cebu South Coastal Road; 2nd Avenue; Sergio Osmeña Boulevard; Mandaue Causeway; Cansaga Bay Bridge; Consolacion–Tayud–Liloan Road; Seaside Avenue	Cebu	
N841	Mandaue	Lapu-Lapu	5.00 km (3.11 mi)	Marcelo B. Fernan Bridge; United Nations Avenue	Cebu	
N845	Mactan		28.08 km (17.45 mi)	Mactan Circumferential Road	Cebu	Goes around Lapu-Lapu City and Cordova
N846	Lapu-Lapu		1.55 km (0.96 mi)	Terminal Building Access Road	Cebu	Connects to Mactan–Cebu International Airport
N847	Lapu-Lapu		2.40 km (1.49 mi)	Mactan Airport Road	Cebu	Connects to Mactan–Cebu International Airport
N848	Tagbilaran		513 m (1,683 ft)	Maria Clara Wharf Road	Bohol	
N849	Talibon		1.96 km (1.22 mi)	Talibon Road	Bohol	Serves Talibon Port
N850	Tagbilaran		260.25 km (161.71 mi)	Tagbilaran North Road (Jetafe to Tagbilaran); Tagbilaran East Road (Tagbilaran to Jagna)	Bohol	Bohol Island Circumferential Road system.
N851	Dauis	Panglao	15.74 km (9.78 mi)	Dauis–Panglao Road	Bohol	
N852	Loay	Trinidad	78.92 km (49.04 mi)	Loay Interior Road	Bohol	
N853	Carmen	Clarin	15.13 km (9.40 mi)	Carmen–Sagbayan–Bacani Road	Bohol	
N854	Jagna	Carmen	45.43 km (28.23 mi)	Jagna–Sierra Bullones Road; Dat-an-Carmen–Sierra Bullones–Pilar–Alicia Road	Bohol	
N855	Carmen	Getafe	48.69 km (30.25 mi)	Buenavista-Carmen–Danao–Getafe Road	Bohol	
N860	Siquijor		75.25 km (46.76 mi)	Siquijor Circumferential Road	Siquijor	Circles the whole island, kilometer zero in Siquijor municipality
N861	Larena		0.15 km (0.093 mi)	Larena Port Road	Siquijor	Connects to Larena Port
N862	Cagayan de Oro	Opol	12.44 km (7.73 mi)	Cagayan de Oro Coastal Bypass Road	Misamis Oriental	
N870	Camiguin		64.17 km (39.87 mi)	Camiguin Circumferential Road	Camiguin	Circles the whole island
N880	Dinagat	Loreto	84.07 km (52.24 mi)	Dinagat–Loreto Road	Dinagat Islands	Both routes in Dinagat Island
N881	Dinagat	Cagdianao	10.26 km (6.38 mi)	Junction Magsaysay–Cagdianao Road	Dinagat Islands	Both routes in Dinagat Island
N890	General Luna	Del Carmen		Dapa–General Luna Road; Dapa–Junction Cancohoy Road	Surigao del Norte	Siargao Island route
N891	Del Carmen			Sayak Airport Road	Surigao del Norte	Siargao Island route. Connects to Sayak/Siargao Airport
N901	Surigao			Surigao Wharf Road	Surigao del Norte	Connects to Surigao Port
N902	Placer	Mati	561 km (349 mi)	Surigao–Davao Coastal Road; Surigao del Sur Boundary–Davao Oriental Coastal Road; Pres. Diosdado P. Macapagal National Highway	Surigao del Norte, Surigao del Sur, Davao Oriental	
N903	Lianga	Prosperidad		Payasan–Los Arcos Road; Awa–Lianga Road	Surigao del Sur, Agusan del Sur	
N904	Prosperidad	Trento		Cuevas–Sampaguita Road; Cuevas–Santa Josefa Road; Butuan–Talacogon–Loreto–Veruela–Santa Josefa Road; Bah-Bah–Talacogon Road	Agusan del Sur	
N905	Barobo	San Francisco		San Francisco–Bahi–Barobo Road	Surigao del Sur, Agusan del Sur	
N906	Montevista	Cateel	78.7 km (48.9 mi)	Compostela–Cateel Road; Montevista–Compostela–Mati Boundary Road	Davao Oriental, Davao de Oro	
N907	Mati	Nabunturan	102 km (63 mi)	Mati–Maragusan Road; Nabunturan–Mainit Park Road; Nabunturan–Maragusan Road; Montevista–Compostela–Mati Boundary Road	Davao Oriental, Davao de Oro	
N908	Tagum		10.2 km (6.3 mi)	Tagum City Diversion Road Capitol Circumferential Road	Davao del Norte	
N909	Tagum	Panabo	69.4 km (43.1 mi)	Tagum–Panabo Circumferential Road	Davao del Norte	
N910	Carmen		10.7 km (6.6 mi)	Santo Tomas–Carmen Road (Carmen segment)	Davao del Norte	
N911	Asuncion	Veruela	81.7 km (50.8 mi)	Asuncion–San Isidro–Laak–Veruela Road	Agusan del Sur, Davao de Oro, Davao del Norte	
N912	Kapalong	Valencia	130 km (81 mi)	Kapalong–Talaingod–Valencia Road	Davao del Norte, Bukidnon	
N913	Davao		18 km (11 mi)	Carlos P. Garcia National Highway	Davao del Sur	
N914	Davao		0.5 km (0.31 mi)	Pakiputan Wharf Road	Davao del Sur	
N915	Davao		1.5 km (0.93 mi)	Catitipan Airport Road	Davao del Sur	Connects to the old terminal building of Francisco Bangoy International Airport
N916	Davao		11 km (6.8 mi)	Quimpo Boulevard; Quezon Boulevard; Leon Garcia Street; R. Castillo Street	Davao del Sur	
N917	Davao		1.9 km (1.2 mi)	J. P. Cabaguio Avenue	Davao del Sur	
N918	Davao		1.7 km (1.1 mi)	Buhangin–Lapanday Road; Dacudao Road	Davao del Sur	
N919	Davao		3.072 km (1.909 mi)	5th Avenue; Marginal Street; Ramon Magsaysay Avenue	Davao del Sur	Connection to Magsaysay Park and Santa Ana Pier. 5th Avenue is also known as Santa Ana Avenue, while Magsaysay Avenue from Acacia Junction to Magsaysay Park is included in N919.
N920	Davao		1.5 km (0.93 mi)	Quirino Avenue	Davao del Sur	Continues westward as N1/AH26
N921	Davao		5 km (3.1 mi)	Ma-a Road	Davao del Sur	
N922	Samal		24.8 km (15.4 mi)	Babak–Samal–Kaputian Road	Davao del Norte	Samal Island route
N923	Digos		4.94 km (3.07 mi)	Digos Diversion Road	Davao del Sur	
N924	Digos		1.88 km (1.17 mi)	Digos Junction Road	Davao del Sur	
N926	Mati		0.18 km (0.11 mi)	Mati Wharf Road	Davao Oriental	Connects to Mati Port
N930	Sulop	General Santos	304 km (189 mi)	Davao–Sarangani Coastal Road; Lagao–Buayan Road	Davao del Sur, Davao Occidental, Sarangani, South Cotabato	Connects to Rajah Buayan Air Base in General Santos
N931	General Santos		22.4 km (13.9 mi)	General Santos City Circumferential Road	South Cotabato	
N932	General Santos		4.7 km (2.9 mi)	Filipino-American Friendship Avenue	South Cotabato	
N935	General Santos	Datu Odin Sinsuat, Maguindanao del Norte	323 km (201 mi)	Hadano Avenue; Makar–Kiamba Road; Sarangani–Sultan Kudarat Coastal Road; Awang–Upi–Lebak–Kalamansig–Palimbang–Sarangani Road	South Cotabato, Sultan Kudarat, Maguindanao del Norte, Maguindanao del Sur, Sarangani	
N936	Datu Odin Sinsuat			Awang Airport Access Road	Maguindanao del Norte	Connects to Awang Airport
N937	Parang	Sultan Mastura		Simuay–Landasan–Parang Road	Maguindanao del Norte	
N939	Parang			Parang Wharf Road	Maguindanao del Norte	Connects to Polloc Port
N940	Koronadal	Midsayap	101 km (63 mi)	Makar–Dulawan–Midsayap–Marbel Road	South Cotabato, Sultan Kudarat, Cotabato, Maguindanao del Sur	
N941	Esperanza	Kalamansig		Isulan Junction–Ninoy Aquino Road; Ninoy Aquino–Lebak–Kalamansig Road	Sultan Kudarat	
N942	Kidapawan	Arakan		Paco–Roxas–Arakan Valley–Junction Davao–Bukidnon Road	Cotabato	
N943	Maramag	Kabacan	93.2 km (57.9 mi)	Sayre Highway (Maramag to Omonay); Bukidnon–Cotabato Road (Carmen to Kabacan)	Bukidnon, Cotabato	
N944	Kalilangan	Wao		Barandias–Dominorog Road; Jct Maradugao–Camp Kibaritan–Dominorog Road; Bumbaran-Talakag Road; Wao–Bumbaran Road	Bukidnon, Lanao del Sur	Bukidnon Boundary–Cotabato Road that connects both segments in Wao is a tertiary road.
N944	Banisilan	Libungan		Banisilan–Guiling–Alamada–Libungan Road	Cotabato	Bukidnon Boundary–Cotabato Road that connects both segments in Wao is a tertiary road.
N945	Maramag	Cagayan de Oro		Maramag–Maradugao Road; Carmen–Patag–Bulua Road; CDO–Airport–Bukidnon Road; Don A. Velez Street; Barandias–Dominorog Road; Cagayan de Oro–Dominorog–Camp Kibaritan Road	Bukidnon, Misamis Oriental	
N946	Cagayan de Oro			Corrales Extension Street–Port Road; CDO–Port Road	Misamis Oriental	Connects to Macabalan Port and also has a misplaced N10/AH26 marker.
N947	Iligan	Balo-i	0.24 km (0.15 mi)	Iligan City–Marawi City Road via Balo-i Airport	Lanao del Norte	Connects to Iligan Airport
N948	Marawi			Marawi–Pugaan Road	Lanao del Sur	ends at Marawi–Ditsaan-Ramain boundary where road becomes Marawi–Masiu Road (N949)
N949	Ditsaan-Ramain	Masiu		Marawi–Masiu Road	Lanao del Sur	Starts at Marawi-Ditsaan-Ramain boundary and ends in Masiu-Lumbayanague boundary.
N950	Lumbayanague	Ganassi		Masiu–Ganassi Road	Lanao del Sur	Starts at Masiu-Lumbayanague boundary.
N951	Butuan		15.5 km (9.6 mi)	Mayor Democrito D. Plaza II Avenue	Agusan del Norte	
N952	Butuan		11.1 km (6.9 mi)	Butuan–Masao Port Road	Agusan del Norte	Connects to Masao Port
N953	Nasipit		4 km (2.5 mi)	Nasipit Port Road	Agusan del Norte	Connects to Nasipit Port
N954	Butuan		0.13 km (0.081 mi)	Bancasi Airport Road	Agusan del Norte	Connects to Bancasi Airport
N955	Gingoog	Villanueva	71 km (44 mi)	Gingoog–Claveria–Villanueva Road; Gingoog–Wharf Road	Misamis Oriental	Connects to Gingoog Port
N956	Iligan			Iligan Junction–South Wharf Road; South Wharf Jct–North Wharf Road; Tibanga Road–Pala-o Junction	Lanao del Norte	Connects to Iligan Port
N957	Tubod			Tubod-Wharf Rd	Lanao del Norte	Connects to Tubod Port
N958	Ozamiz		0.9 km (0.56 mi)	Ozamiz Port Road Ozamiz Cotta Road	Misamis Occidental	Connects to Port of Ozamiz from N78 and N79.
N959	Ozamiz		2 km (1.2 mi)	Gango–Airport Road	Misamis Occidental	Connects to Ozamiz City Airport from N79.
N960	Oroquieta	Baliangao	50 km (31 mi)	Oroquieta–Calamba Mountain Road; Calamba–Baliangao Road	Misamis Occidental	Connects to Baliangao Protected Landscape and Seascape.
N961	Sapang Dalaga	Dapitan	76.129 km (47.304 mi)	Rizal–Dakak–Dapitan Coastal Loop Road; Junction Polo–Dapitan Park National Road	Zamboanga del Norte, Misamis Occidental	
N962	Dapitan		1.750 km (1.087 mi)	Pulauan Port Road	Zamboanga del Norte	Connects to Dapitan Port
N963	Dipolog		0.494 km (0.307 mi)	Old Airport Road	Zamboanga del Norte	Connects to Dipolog Airport
N964	Dipolog		0.575 km (0.357 mi)	Junction South Airport Road	Zamboanga del Norte	Connects to Dipolog Airport
N965	Mahayag	Sindangan	62.075 km (38.572 mi)	Sindangan–Siayan–Dumingag–Mahayag Road	Zamboanga del Sur, Zamboanga del Norte	
N966	Liloy	Zamboanga	257.013 km (159.700 mi)	Zamboanga City–Labuan–Limpapa Road; Siocon–Sirawai–Sibuco–Limpapa Road; Liloy–Siocon Road	Zamboanga del Sur, Zamboanga del Norte	
N968	Zamboanga		1.866 km (1.159 mi)	Governor Camins Road	Zamboanga del Sur	
N969	Zamboanga		0.670 km (0.416 mi)	Airport Road	Zamboanga del Sur	Connects to Zamboanga International Airport
N970	Zamboanga		0.678 km (0.421 mi)	N.S. Valderosa Street	Zamboanga del Sur	
N971	Zamboanga		0.189 km (0.117 mi)	Wharf Road	Zamboanga del Sur	Connects to Port of Zamboanga
N972	Zamboanga		38.69 km (24.04 mi)	Zamboanga City Bypass Road	Zamboanga del Sur	
N980	Basilan		129.578 km (80.516 mi)	Basilan Circumferential Road Isabela-Maluso-Sumisip Road Isabela-Lamitan Wharf Road	Basilan	Circumnavigates the entire island.
N981	Maluso		1.66 km (1.03 mi)	Isabela–Maluso–Wharf Road	Basilan	Connects to Maluso Port
N982	Lamitan			Isabela-Lamitan Wharf Road	Basilan	
N985	Jolo			Jolo Airport Road	Sulu	Connects to Jolo Airport
N986	Jolo			Jolo–Cadre–New Capitol Road	Sulu	
N987	Jolo	Talipao		Jolo Port–Bud Daho–Romandier Road	Sulu	Connects to Jolo Port
N988	Jolo	Parang		Jolo–Indanan–Parang–Silangkan Road	Sulu	
N989	Indanan	Talipao		Timbangan Junction–Romandier Road	Sulu	
N990	Jolo	Panglima Estino		Jolo–Taglibi–Tiptipon Road	Sulu	
N991	Old Panamao	Luuk		Seit–Tayungan–Camp Andres Road	Sulu	
N992	Talipao	Luuk		Romandier–Camp Andres–Tanduh Bato Road	Sulu	

=== Unnumbered routes ===
==== Secondary roads ====
Region	From	To	Length	Component roads	Areas served	Notes
II	Ilagan	Divilacan	82.004 kilometers	Ilagan–Divilacan Road	Isabela	Pending conversion into a national road through House Bill No. 2084 filed by Tonypet Albano
III	Guimba	Umingan		Guimba-Talugtug-Umingan Road	Nueva Ecija, Pangasinan	Originally named as Guimba-Talugtug-Umingan Provincial Road. Converted to a national road via Republic Act No. 11485
BARMM	Datu Saudi Ampatuan			Salbu–Pagatin Highway	Maguindanao del Norte	Connects N1 to N940

== See also ==
- Asian highway network
- Philippine expressway network
- Philippine Nautical Highway System
- Manila's arterial road network
- Transportation in the Philippines
- List of bridges in the Philippines
