= Laoag Airport Road =

Secondary road in the Philippines

Laoag Airport Road
- Airport Avenue; Airport Access Road; Airport Road

Route information
- Maintained by Department of Public Works and Highways - Ilocos Norte 1st District Engineering Office
- Length: 6.435 km (3.999 mi)
- Component highways: N100

Major junctions
- East end: N1 / N2 (Manila North Road)
- N122 (Laoag-Balacad Road / Rodolfo G. Fariñas Bypass Road)
- West end: Laoag International Airport

Location
- Country: Philippines
- Provinces: Ilocos Norte
- Major cities: Laoag

Highway system
- Roads in the Philippines; Highways; Expressways; List
← N83	→ N101

The Laoag Airport Road, also known as Airport Avenue, Airport Access Road, and Airport Road, is a national secondary road that connects the Manila North Road to Laoag International Airport.

The entire road is designated as National Route 100 (N100) of the Philippine highway network.

== Intersections ==
The entire route is located in Laoag. Intersections are numbered by kilometer posts, with Rizal Park in Manila designated as kilometer zero.

km	mi	Destinations	Notes
485.55	301.71	N1 / N2 (Manila North Road)	Eastern terminus
487.84	303.13	N122 (Laoag-Balacad Road / Rodolfo G. Fariñas Bypass Road)	Ilocano Migrants’ Monument roundabout; also an alternative road to Pagudpud and Cagayan
490.487	304.774	Araniw Bridge	
492.90	306.27	Laoag International Airport	Western terminus
1.000 mi = 1.609 km; 1.000 km = 0.621 mi
