= N79 highway =

Road in the Philippines

Route 79

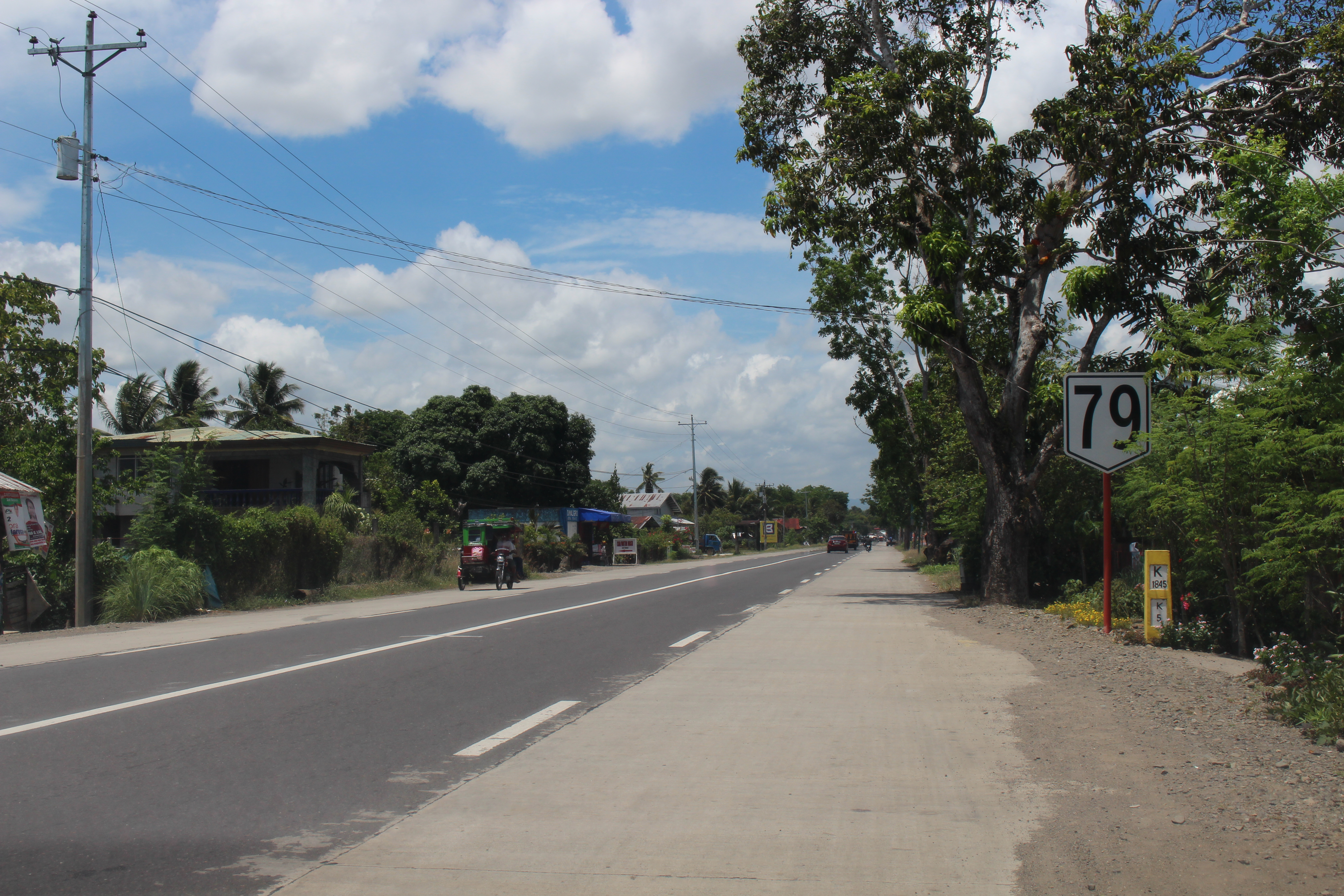
- Reassurance marker at Dipolog

Route information
- Length: 302 km (188 mi)
- Component highways: N79 (Ipil–Dipolog Road); N79 (Dipolog–Oroquieta Road); N79 (Ozamiz–Oroquieta Road)

Major junctions
- West end: AH 26 (N1) (Maharlika Highway) in Ipil
- N966 (Zamboanga West Coastal Road) in Liloy; N965 (Sindangan–Siayan–Dumingag–Mahayag Road) in Sindangan; N80 (Molave–Dipolog Road) in Katipunan; N961 (Rizal–Dakak–Dapitan Coastal Road) in Dapitan; N960 (Oroquieta–Calamba Mountain Road) in Calamba; N960 (Oroquieta–Calamba Mountain Road) in Oroquieta; N959 (Ozamiz Airport Road) in Ozamiz
- East end: N78 (Ozamiz–Aurora Road) / N958 (Ozamiz Port Road) in Ozamiz

Location
- Country: Philippines
- Provinces: Zamboanga Sibugay, Zamboanga del Norte, Misamis Occidental
- Major cities: Oroquieta, Ozamiz, Dipolog, Dapitan
- Towns: Ipil, Titay, Kalawit, Tampilisan, Liloy, Salug, Bacungan, Sindangan, Jose Dalman, Manukan, Pres. Manuel A. Roxas, Katipunan, Sibutad, Rizal, Sapang Dalaga, Baliangao, Calamba, Plaridel, Lopez Jaena, Aloran, Panaon, Jimenez, Sinacaban, Tudela, Clarin

Highway system
- Roads in the Philippines; Highways; Expressways; List
← N78	→ N80

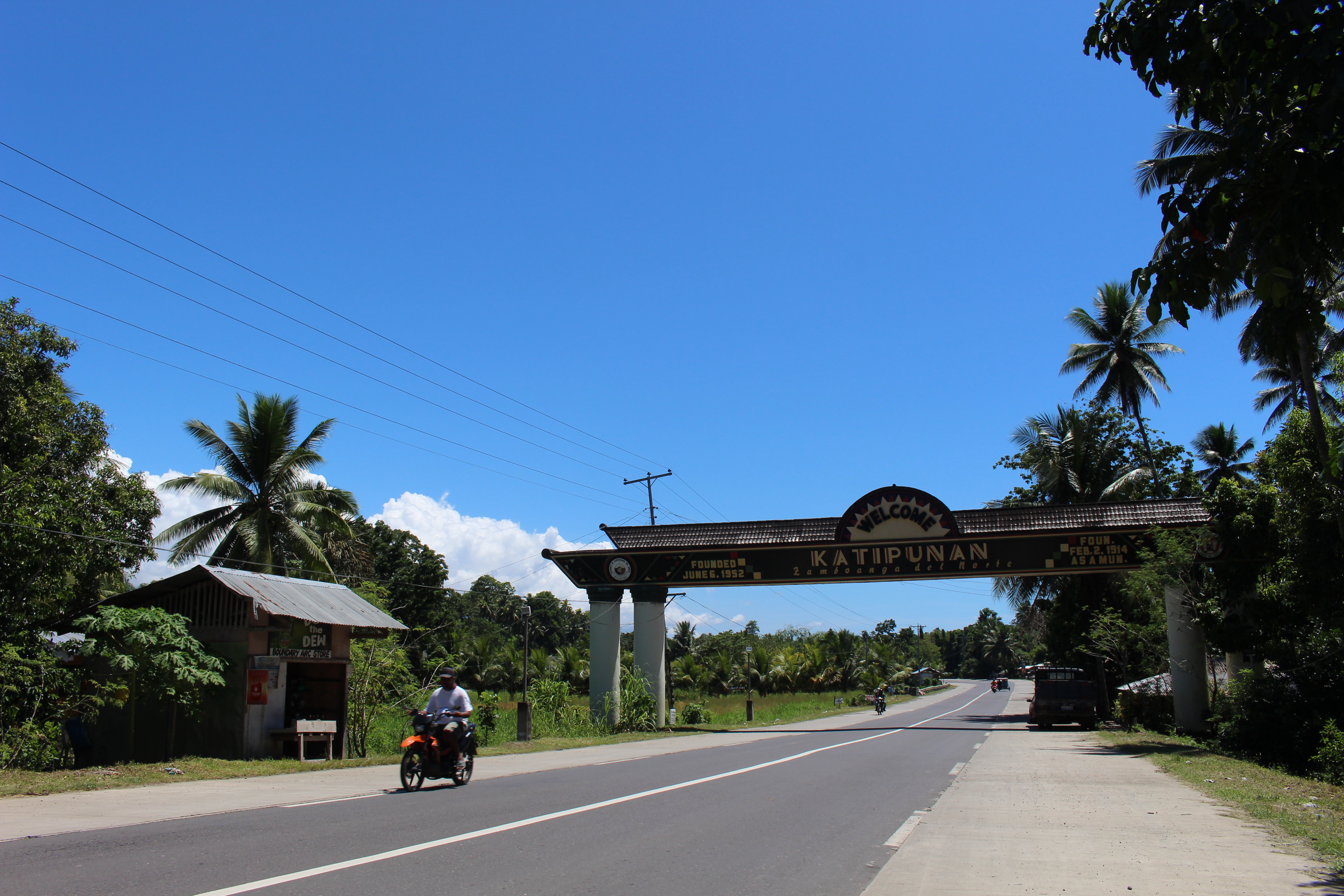
N79 in Katipunan, Zamboanga del Norte

National Route 79 (N79) is a 302-kilometer (188 mi), two-to-four lane national primary road connecting the provinces of Misamis Occidental, Zamboanga del Norte, and Zamboanga Sibugay. It traverses through many municipalities in Zamboanga del Norte and Misamis Occidental.

== Route description ==
=== Ipil to Liloy ===
N79 starts as Ipil–Liloy–Sindangan Road. It traverses to Titay. After reaching the boundary of Zamboanga Sibugay and Zamboanga del Norte, the road is named Liloy–Ipil Road.

=== Liloy to Sindangan ===
N79 continues as Liloy–Ipil Road. After reaching Liloy–Siocon Road (N966), the road is called Sindangan–Liloy Road. After reaching Leon B. Pestigo or Sindangan, the road is called Dipolog–Sindangan–Liloy Road.

=== Sindangan to Dipolog ===
Dipolog–Sindangan–Liloy Road continues until reaching the boundary of Katipunan and Dipolog.

=== Dipolog to Oroquieta ===
After reaching the boundary of Katipunan and Dipolog thus ending Dipolog–Sindangan–Liloy Road, the road becomes Dipolog–Zamboanga Road. It would then traverse the city's poblacion as Quezon Avenue, continues to downtown Dipolog turning east of Rizal Avenue, south of F. Herrera Street, east of General Luna Street, and heads back north to Dapitan from the roundabout (P'gsalabuk Circle), becoming Dipolog-Oroquieta Road. In Dapitan, the road goes into a roundabout with Polo–Dapitan Park Road (N961). After reaching the boundary of Zamboanga del Norte and Misamis Occidental, the road is called Oroquieta–Plaridel–Calamba–Sapang Dalaga Road. After reaching the junction of Oroquieta–Calamba Mountain Road (N960), the road is now called Ozamiz–Oroquieta Road.

=== Oroquieta to Ozamiz ===
Ozamiz–Oroquieta Road continues until reaching the three way intersection with Ozamiz–Pagadian Road (N78) and Ozamiz Port Road (N958), the road ends as well as N79.

== Intersections ==
Intersections are numbered by kilometer post, with Rizal Park in Manila designated as kilometer 0.

Province	City/Municipality	km	mi	Destinations	Notes
Zamboanga Sibugay	Ipil	2,013	1,251	AH 26 (N1) (Maharlika Highway)	Roundabout and western terminus
Zamboanga del Norte	Liloy	1,965	1,221	N966 (Zamboanga West Coastal Road)	
Zamboanga del Norte	Sindangan	1,919	1,192	N965 (Sindangan–Siayan–Dumingag–Mahayag Road)	
Zamboanga del Norte	Dipolog	1,845	1,146	N80 (Molave–Dipolog Road)	
Zamboanga del Norte	Dipolog	1,826	1,135	N961 (Rizal–Dakak–Dapitan Coastal Road)	
Misamis Occidental	Calamba	1,824	1,133	N960 (Oroquieta–Calamba Mountain Road)	
Misamis Occidental	Oroquieta	1,797	1,117	N960 (Oroquieta–Calamba Mountain Road)	
Misamis Occidental	Ozamiz	1,705	1,059	N959 (Ozamiz Airport Road)	
Misamis Occidental	Ozamiz	1,700	1,100	N78 (Ozamiz-Aurora Road) N958 (Ozamiz Port Road)	Eastern terminus
1.000 mi = 1.609 km; 1.000 km = 0.621 mi

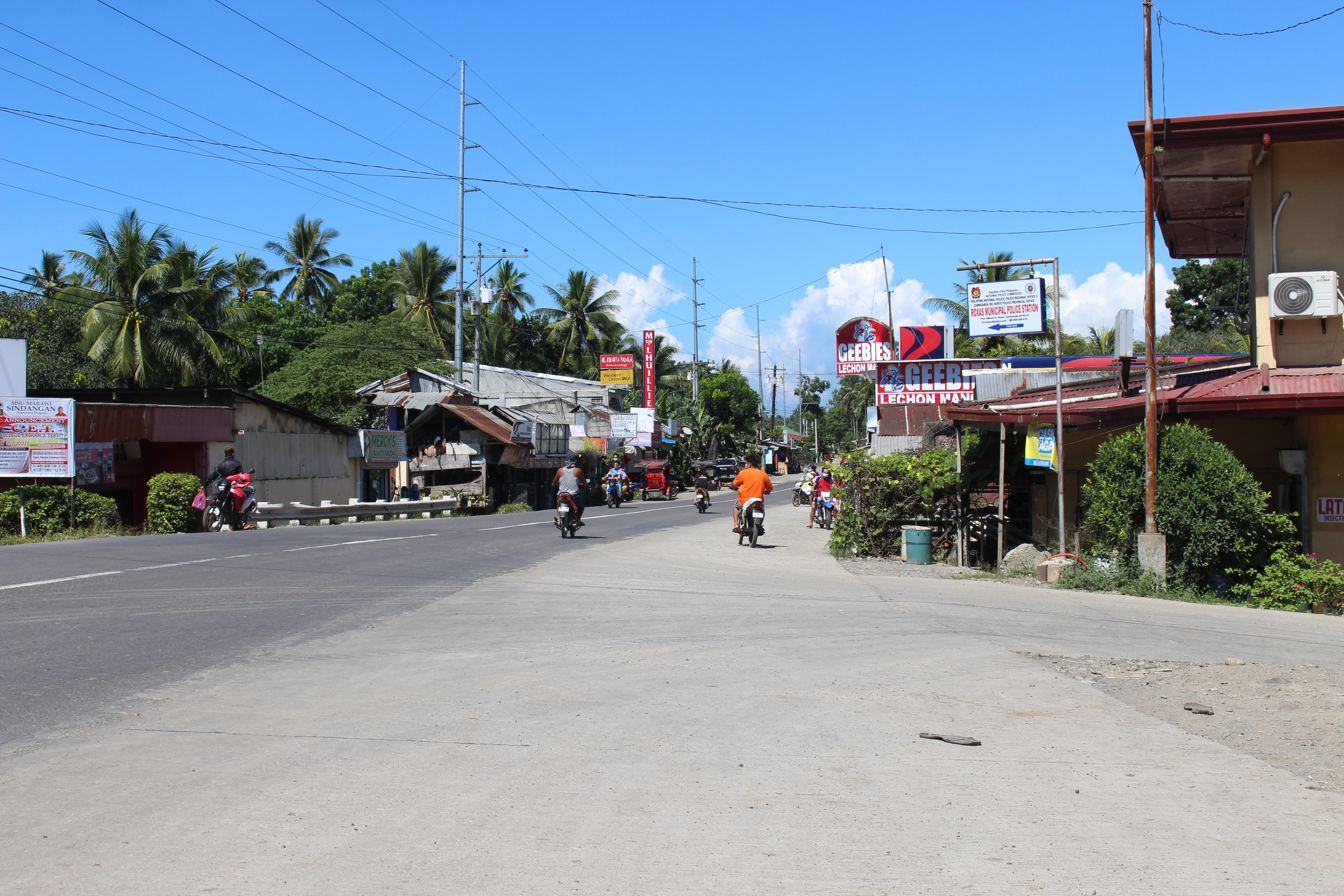
N79 in Roxas
