= N78 =

N78 may refer to:

== Roads ==
- N78 road (Ireland)
- Ozamiz–Pagadian Road, in the Philippines
- Nebraska Highway 78, in the United States

== Other uses ==
- N78 (Long Island bus)
- HMS Talisman (N78), a submarine of the Royal Navy
- Mangarrayi language
- Nokia N78, a smartphone
