= Magapit–Santa Teresita Road =

Secondary road in Cagayan province, Philippines

Magapit–Santa Teresita Road
- Magapit–Mission Road

Route information
- Maintained by Department of Public Works and Highways – Cagayan 1st District Engineering Office
- Length: 33.123 km (20.582 mi)
- Component highways: N119

Major junctions
- West end: AH 26 (N1) (Maharlika Highway) / N101 (Cagayan Valley Road) in Lal-lo
- East end: N102 (Dugo–San Vicente Road) in Santa Teresita

Location
- Country: Philippines
- Provinces: Cagayan
- Towns: Lal-lo, Santa Teresita

Highway system
- Roads in the Philippines; Highways; Expressways; List
← N118	→ N120

Magapit–Santa Teresita Road (also known as Magapit–Mission Road) is a two-lane, 33.123-kilometer (20.582 mi) national secondary road in the Cagayan province of the Philippines. It serves as a bypass road starting from Magapit Interchange in Lal-lo and ends at Dugo–San Vicente Road in Barangay Mission, Santa Teresita, making a shorter travel time to the Cagayan Special Economic Zone. The Cagayan North International Airport is accessible through this road.

The entire road is designated as National Route 119 (N119) of the Philippine highway network.
