= Oroquieta–Calamba Mountain Road =

Road in Misamis Occidental, Philippines

Oroquieta–Calamba Mountain Road

Route information
- Maintained by Department of Public Works and Highways
- Length: 50 km (31 mi)
- Component highways: N960

Major junctions
- North end: Baliangao, Misamis Occidental
- N79 (Oroquieta–Dipolog Road) at Calamba, Misamis Occidental
- South end: N79 (Ozamiz–Oroquieta Road) at Oroquieta, Misamis Occidental

Location
- Country: Philippines
- Major cities: Oroquieta
- Towns: Calamba, Baliangao

Highway system
- Roads in the Philippines; Highways; Expressways; List
← N959	→ N961

The Oroquieta–Calamba Mountain Road is a 50-kilometer (31 mi), national secondary road in Misamis Occidental, Philippines. The entire road is designated as National Route 960 (N960) of the Philippine highway network.
