= Cagayan Valley Road =

Road in the Philippines

Cagayan Valley Road
- Maharlika Highway
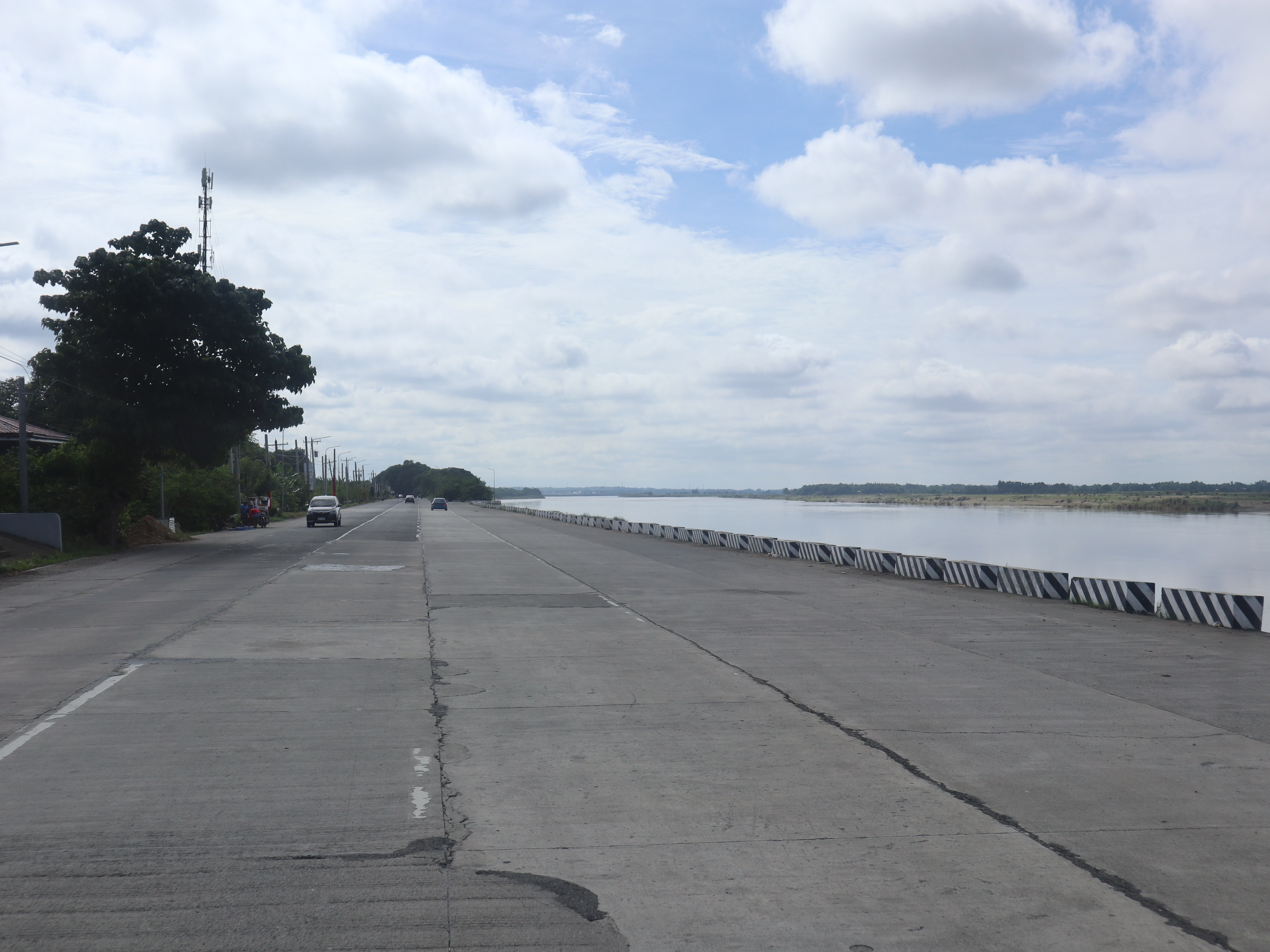
- Cagayan Valley Road in Namabbalan Sur, Tuguegarao, Cagayan.

Route information
- Maintained by Department of Public Works and Highways
- Length: 121.216 km (75.320 mi)
- Component highways: N103 in Aparri; N101 from Aparri to Lal-lo; AH 26 (N1) from Lal-lo to Tuguegarao

Major junctions
- North end: Aparri Port in Aparri
- N101 (Aparri Airport Road) in Aparri; N102 (Dugo–San Vicente Road) in Camalaniugan; N119 (Magapit–Santa Teresita Road) in Lal-lo; N104 (Tuguegarao Bypass Road) in Tuguegarao; N51 (Cagayan–Apayao Road) / N106 (Tuguegarao Diversion Road II) in Tuguegarao
- South end: AH 26 (N1) (Maharlika Highway) near the Tuguegarao–San Pablo boundary

Location
- Country: Philippines
- Provinces: Cagayan
- Major cities: Tuguegarao
- Towns: Aparri, Camalaniugan, Lal-lo, Gattaran, Alcala, Amulung, Iguig, Peñablanca

Highway system
- Roads in the Philippines; Highways; Expressways; List

Cagayan Valley Road is a 121.216-kilometer (75.320 mi) major highway that connects the cities and municipalities of the province of Cagayan, Philippines.

The road forms part of National Route 1 (N1), National Route 103 (N103) and National Route 101 (N101) of the Philippine highway network. Its segment from Lal-lo to Tuguegarao is also a component of the Pan-Philippine Highway, also known as Maharlika Highway and designated as Asian Highway 26 (AH26).

== Route description ==
Cagayan Valley Road is northernmost road in Cagayan that connects Aparri to Tuguegarao, running in parallel to Cagayan River, the country's longest river. It also refers to the alternate name of Maharlika Highway that reaches south up to the Central Luzon province of Bulacan.

=== Aparri to Lal-lo ===
The road's Junction Aparri Airport–Port section starts as Loriga Gallarza Street at the Aparri Port in the northern coastal town of Aparri that also serves ferries to Batanes. It traverses the town proper and turns south as De Rivera Street. At the intersection with Rizal Street (Aparri Airport Road), N103 ends and the route number changes to N101, which it continues from the intersecting road. There, the road's Magapit–Aparri Road section commences. It then traverses the towns of Camalaniugan and Lal-lo.

=== Lal-lo to Tuguegarao ===
At the Magapit Interchange in Lal-lo, the road's route number transitions from N101 to AH26/N1 with the name Pan-Philippine Highway or Maharlika Highway as it continues its course to the south. It then traverses the towns of Gattaran, Alcala, Amulung, and Iguig. It enters the city of Tuguegarao, where it turns to the east at its intersection with Cagayan–Apayao Road/R. Balzain Highway (N51) and Tuguegarao Diversion Road II (N106). It then serves as an eastern radial road out of Tuguegarao as it diverts away from the city proper. Past Enrile Boulevard (N104), it enters the town of Peñablanca but turns away from the town proper as it would cross the Pinancauanan River back to Tuguegarao. It ends near the Cagayan–Isabela provincial boundary, where it continues as the Maharlika Highway, although the name is alternatively used up to its section in the Central Luzon province of Bulacan.

== History ==
Cagayan Valley Road was historically designated as Highway 5, which ran from Aparri to Bulacan, especially during the American colonial period. The highway's section from Lal-lo southwards later became part of the Pan-Philippine Highway beginning in the 1960s.

== Intersections ==
The entire route is located in Cagayan. Intersections are numbered by kilometer posts, with Rizal Park in Manila designated as kilometer zero.

City/Municipality	km	mi	Destinations	Notes
Aparri			Aparri Port — Calayan	Northern terminus. Ferry access to Calayan Island.
Aparri			Loriga Gallarza Street / De Rivera Street	Route southward to De Rivera Street turns from unnumbered to N103.
Aparri			Rizal Street — Buguey	Eastbound to Buguey town proper via Brgy. Paddaya & San Isidro. Route designation changes to N101.
Camalaniugan			Aparri–Camalaniugan Road — Allacapan, Ballesteros	Camalaniugan Bridge linking Aparri to AH 26 (N1) (Manila North Road) at Bangag Junction. Under construction.
Camalaniugan			N102 (Camalaniugan–Santa Ana Road) – Santa Ana, Gonzaga, Santa Teresita	Also known as Dugo–San Vicente Road.
Lal-lo			Bagumbayan–Magallongon Provincial Road	
Lal-lo			CVAC Road	Access road to Cagayan State University, Lal-lo Campus.
Lal-lo			AH 26 (N1) (Magapit–Santa Teresita Road) / N119 (Manila North Road) – Apayao, Ilocos Norte, Santa Teresita, Santa Ana	Magapit Interchange; Start of AH26 concurrency. Route changes to N1.
Gattaran			Junction Gattaran–Capissayan–Bolos Point Road	
Alcala			Baybayog–Baggao–Dalin–Santa Margarita Road	
Amulung			Amulung Bypass Road	Bypasses Amulung town proper. Loops back to highway.
Amulung			Anquiray–Abolo Road	Amulung Bridge across the Cagayan River. Under construction.
Iguig			Baculod–San Jose Provincial Road	
Iguig			Ugac Barrio Provincial Road	
Tuguegarao			Tuguegarao West Diversion Road	Starts from Brgy. Carig and ends in Brgy. Buntun. Under construction.
Tuguegarao			N104 (Tuguegarao Bypass Road)	Also known as Enrile Boulevard. Loops back to AH 26 (N1) (Manila North Road).
Tuguegarao			Linao–Carig Road	
Tuguegarao			Bartolome Street	Alternate access to AH 26 (N1) (Manila North Road).
Tuguegarao			N51 (Balzain Highway) / N106 (Tuguegarao Diversion Road II) – Kalinga, Cauayan, Solana	Tanza Circle. Westbound and southbound provides access to Isabela via Kalinga. Route turns northeast-bound from the rotunda.
Tuguegarao			Batang Street	Alternate access to AH 26 (N1) (Manila North Road) via the Pinacanauan Overflow Bridge.
Tuguegarao			N104 (Tuguegarao Bypass Road)	Loops back to AH 26 (N1) (Manila North Road).
Peñablanca			Peñablanca–Callao Cave Road	Access to Peñablanca town proper & Callao Cave.
Tuguegarao			Tuguegarao–Libag Road	Access to Tuguegarao city proper.
Tuguegarao			Namabbalan Norte–Baliuag–Bical–Cabbo Road	
Tuguegarao – San Pablo boundary			AH 26 (N1) (Manila North Road) – Ilagan, Cauayan, Santiago, Manila	End of Cagayan Valley Road.
1.000 mi = 1.609 km; 1.000 km = 0.621 mi: Unopened
