= N682 highway =

National highway in Biliran, Philippines

Route 682
- Naval–Caibiran Cross Country Road

Route information
- Length: 20 km (12 mi)

Major junctions
- West end: N680 in Naval
- East end: N680 in Caibiran

Location
- Country: Philippines
- Provinces: Biliran
- Towns: Naval, Caibiran

Highway system
- Roads in the Philippines; Highways; Expressways; List

National Route 682 (N682), officially known as the Naval–Caibiran Cross Country Road, is a national highway in Biliran, Philippines. The route runs east–west for 20 kilometres (12 mi), connecting the provincial capital of Naval in the west to Caibiran in the east. At both termini, the road intersects with the Biliran Circumferential Road (N680). The highway passes through mountainous interior terrain, including the area between Mount Gumasan and Mount Sayao, and traverses the campus of Biliran Province State University. In 1983, a bill was passed to construct the highway among others in Eastern Visayas, and the road was subsequently labeled a national highway the following year.

== Route description ==
N682 starts east from the Port of Biliran in a 344-metre (1,129 ft) segment, passing through the local market and numerous stores. The route briefly intersects with the Biliran Circumferential Road (N680), with the primary Padre Burgos Road bearing the marker 680. N680 then moves south on Padre Garcia Road, leading the route to start once again in the center of Naval, Biliran. The road passes the Biliran Province State University before traveling through the outskirts of the municipality. It then meanders away from its initial straight, northeast trajectory. From the original flat forest, the highway ventures into mountainous territory, passing between Mount Gumasan and Mount Sayao. Within this stretch, the road winds past waterfalls and landmarks, crossing into the Municipality of Caibiran, Biliran. The route subsequently terminates in an intersection with the Biliran Circumferential Road in Caibiran, with a segment length of 19.73 kilometres (12.26 mi) and a total length of 20 kilometres (12 mi). Out of the 20.3-kilometre (12.6 mi) length noted in the Department of Public Works and Highways Atlas, 11.63 kilometres (7.23 mi) of the road is made from asphalt and 8.72 kilometres (5.42 mi) is made from concrete.

== History ==
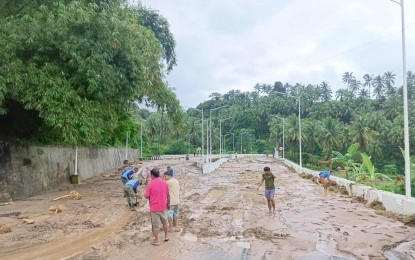
The Naval–Caibiran Road during Typhoon Bualoi

Travel between Naval and Caibiran originally consisted of a network of mountain trails during the early 1900s. The Philippine Legislature passed acts in the 1930s to fund and construct the Naval–Caibiran Road in what was then Leyte province. In 1983, the Batasang Pambansa introduced Parliamentary Bill No. 3865, authorizing the completion of the highway among other roads in northwestern Leyte. Following its completion, Batas Pambansa Blg. 832 officially converted the route into a national highway on April 27, 1984. The rehabilitation of the corridor was discussed between the late 1980s and early 1990s, and a rehabilitation project was completed in January 2020. In September 2025, torrential rains from Typhoon Bualoi triggered soil collapse, forcing a temporary closure of the mountain pass.

== Major intersections ==
The entire route is located in Biliran. Intersections are numbered by kilometer post, with Rizal Park in Manila designated as kilometer zero.

City/Municipality	km	mi	Destinations	Notes
Naval	1,026	638	N680	
Caibiran	1,045	649	N680	
1.000 mi = 1.609 km; 1.000 km = 0.621 mi
