= Ozamiz Airport Road =

Road in Misamis Occidental, Philippines

Coordinates: 8°10′49″N 123°51′13″E

Ozamiz Airport Road
- Gango Airport Road; Labo Airport Road

Route information
- Maintained by Department of Public Works and Highways
- Length: 2 km (1.2 mi)
- Component highways: N959

Major junctions
- East end: N79 (Ozamiz–Oroquieta Road) in Ozamiz
- West end: Labo Airport

Location
- Country: Philippines
- Major cities: Ozamiz

Highway system
- Roads in the Philippines; Highways; Expressways; List
← N958	→ N960

The Ozamiz Airport Road, also known as the Gango Airport Road or Labo Airport Road, is a 2-kilometer (1.2 mi), national secondary road in Misamis Occidental, Philippines. It connects the Ozamiz Airport from Ozamiz–Oroquieta Road. The entire road is designated as National Route 959 (N959) of the Philippine highway network.
