= Barotac Nuevo–Dumangas–Dacutan Wharf Road =

Road in the Philippines

Barotac Nuevo–Dumangas–Dacutan Wharf Road

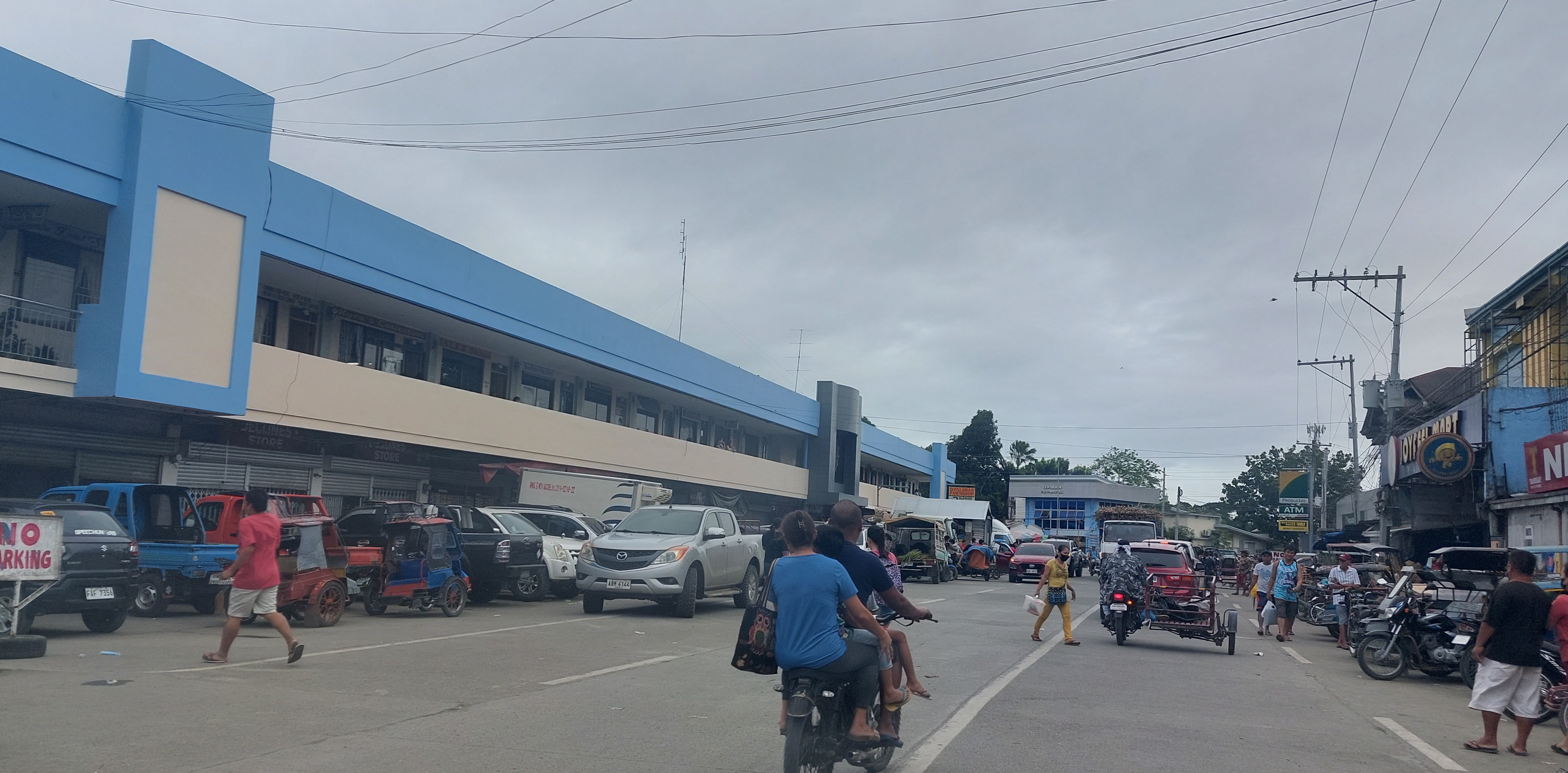
- Route 655 beside Barotac Nuevo Public Market.

Route information
- Maintained by Department of Public Works and Highways
- Length: 12.6 km (7.8 mi)
- Component highways: N655

Major junctions
- North end: N508 (Iloilo East Coast–Capiz Road) in Barotac Nuevo
- South end: N509 (Iloilo–Leganes–Dumangas Coastal Road) in Dumangas

Location
- Country: Philippines
- Provinces: Iloilo
- Towns: Barotac Nuevo; Dumangas

Highway system
- Roads in the Philippines; Highways; Expressways; List
← N654	→ N657

Barotac Nuevo–Dumangas–Dacutan Wharf Road is a 12.6-kilometer (7.8 mi), national secondary road in the province of Iloilo, Philippines. It connects the municipalities of Barotac Nuevo and Dumangas and provides fast access to the Port of Dumangas.

The entire road is designated as National Route 655 (N655) of the Philippine highway network. It is the also only secondary road in Panay Island to be part of the 600-series, as every other secondary route are on the 500-series. Furthermore, it also has a misplaced N508 route marker, where the only N655 sign should've been mounted.

== Intersections ==
The entire route is located in Iloilo. Intersections are numbered by kilometer post, with Arroyo Fountain in Iloilo City designated as kilometer 0.

City/Municipality	km	mi	Destinations	Notes
Barotac Nuevo			N508 (Iloilo East Coast–Capiz Road) – New Lucena, Anilao, Sta. Barbara	Northern terminus.
Dumangas			Lublub–Calao–Rosario–Cansilayan Road	
Dumangas			Lublub–Bolilao–Salad Road	
Dumangas			Regidor Street	
Dumangas			Mabini Street	
Dumangas			Burgos Street	
Dumangas			Buenaflor Street	
Dumangas			Bangga Ermita–Sulangan–Balabag Road / Sulangan–Ermita–Patlad Road	
Dumangas			N509 (Iloilo–Leganes–Dumangas Coastal Road) – Leganes, Dumangas Port, Iloilo City	Southern terminus.
1.000 mi = 1.609 km; 1.000 km = 0.621 mi
