= Molave–Dipolog Road =

Road in the Philippines

Molave–Dipolog Road
- Malindang Mountain Road
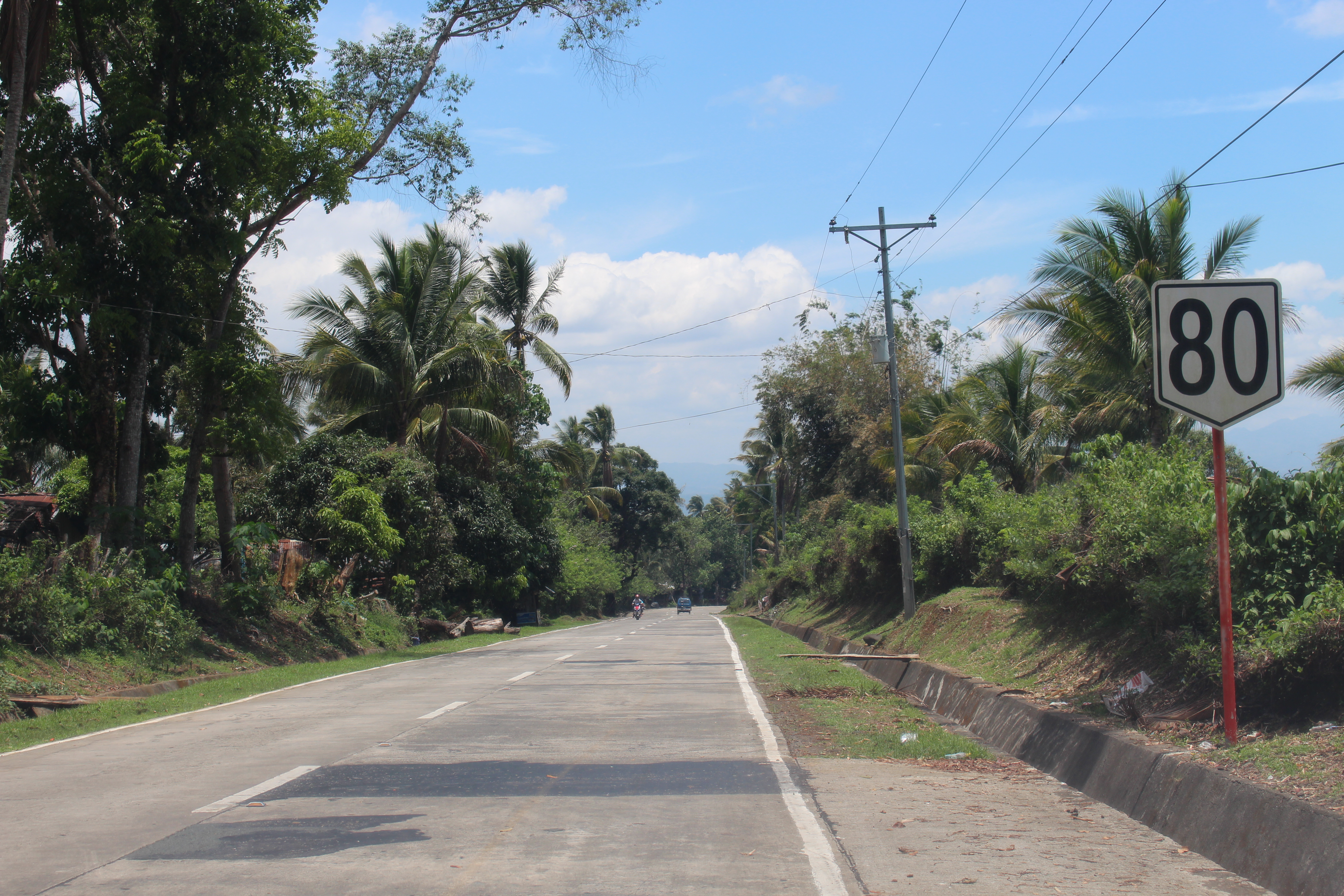
- Reassurance Marker at Josefina, Zamboanga del Sur

Route information
- Maintained by the Department of Public Works and Highways
- Length: 82 km (51 mi)
- Component highways: N80

Major junctions
- From: N78 (Ozamiz–Pagadian Road) at Molave
- N965 (Sindangan–Siayan–Dumingag–Mahayag Road) at Mahayag
- To: N79 (Ipil–Dipolog Road) at Dipolog

Location
- Country: Philippines
- Provinces: Zamboanga del Norte, Zamboanga del Sur
- Major cities: Dipolog
- Towns: Polanco, Pinan, Sergio Osmeña Sr., Josefina, Mahayag, Molave

Highway system
- Roads in the Philippines; Highways; Expressways; List
← N79	→ N81

The Molave–Dipolog Road, also known as the Malindang Mountain Road, is an 82-kilometer (51 mi), two-to-four lane, primary national road that connects the provinces of Zamboanga del Norte and Zamboanga del Sur. This road serves as the main highway when going to Dipolog from Pagadian.

The entire highway is designated as National Route 80 (N80) of the Philippine highway network.
