= Filipino–American Friendship Highway =

Secondary national road in Pampanga, Philippines

Filipino–American Friendship Highway
- Friendship Circumferential Road
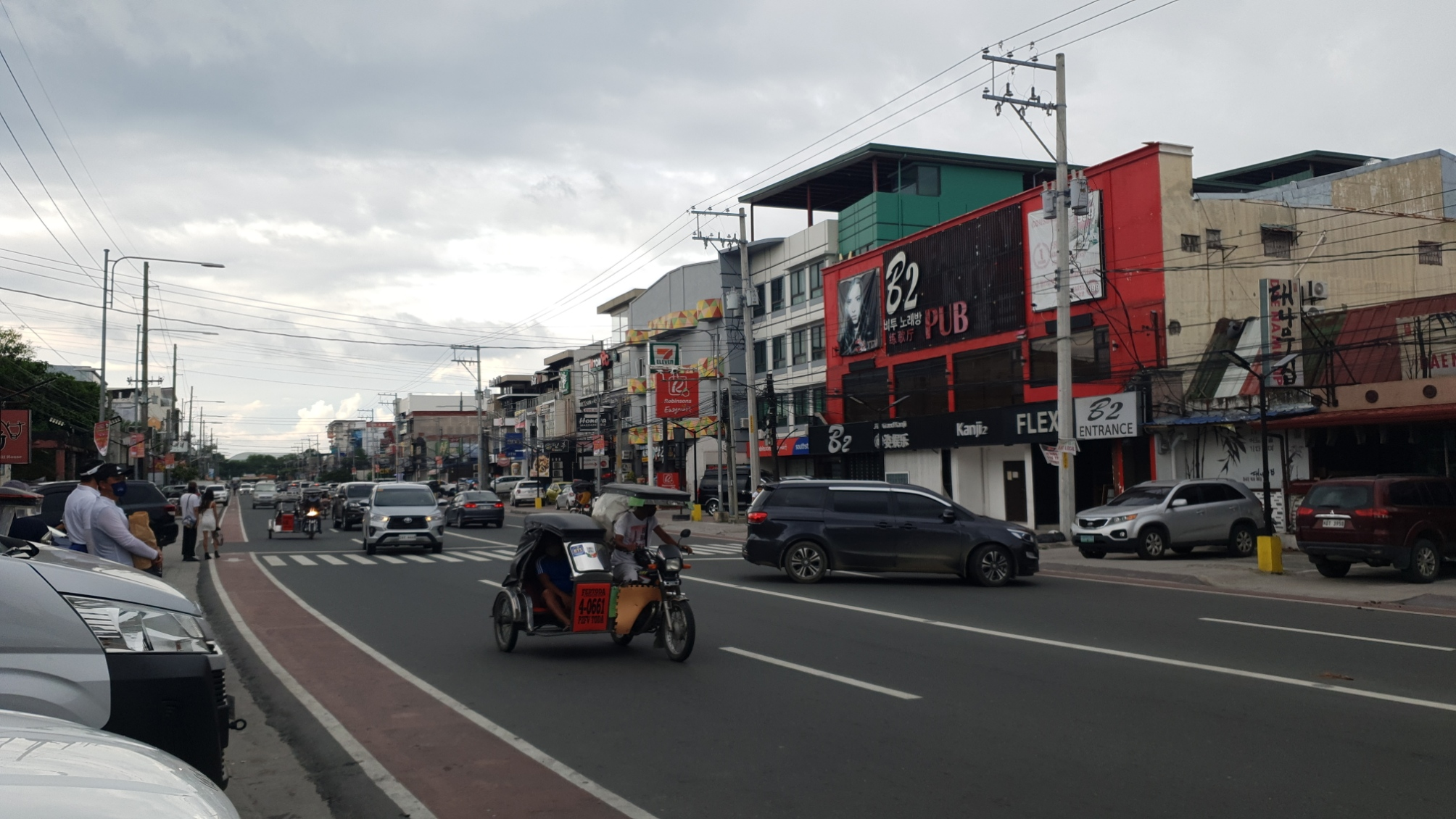
- The Fil-Am Friendship Highway in the Koreatown area of Angeles City

Route information
- Maintained by the Department of Public Works and Highways – Pampanga 1st District Engineering Office and Pampanga 3rd District Engineering Office
- Component highways: N216

Major junctions
- North end: Don Juico Avenue in Angeles City
- N217 (Angeles–Porac–Floridablanca–Dinalupihan Road)
- South end: N2 (MacArthur Highway) in San Fernando, Pampanga

Location
- Country: Philippines
- Provinces: Pampanga
- Major cities: Angeles City and San Fernando

Highway system
- Roads in the Philippines; Highways; Expressways; List
← N215	→ N217

The Filipino–American Friendship Highway, officially the Friendship Circumferential Road (or simply the Friendship Highway), is a secondary national road traversing the cities of Angeles City and San Fernando in Pampanga, Philippines.

The entire highway is designated as National Route 216 (N216) of the Philippine highway network.
