= Baliangao Protected Landscape and Seascape =

- IUCN category V (protected landscape/seascape)
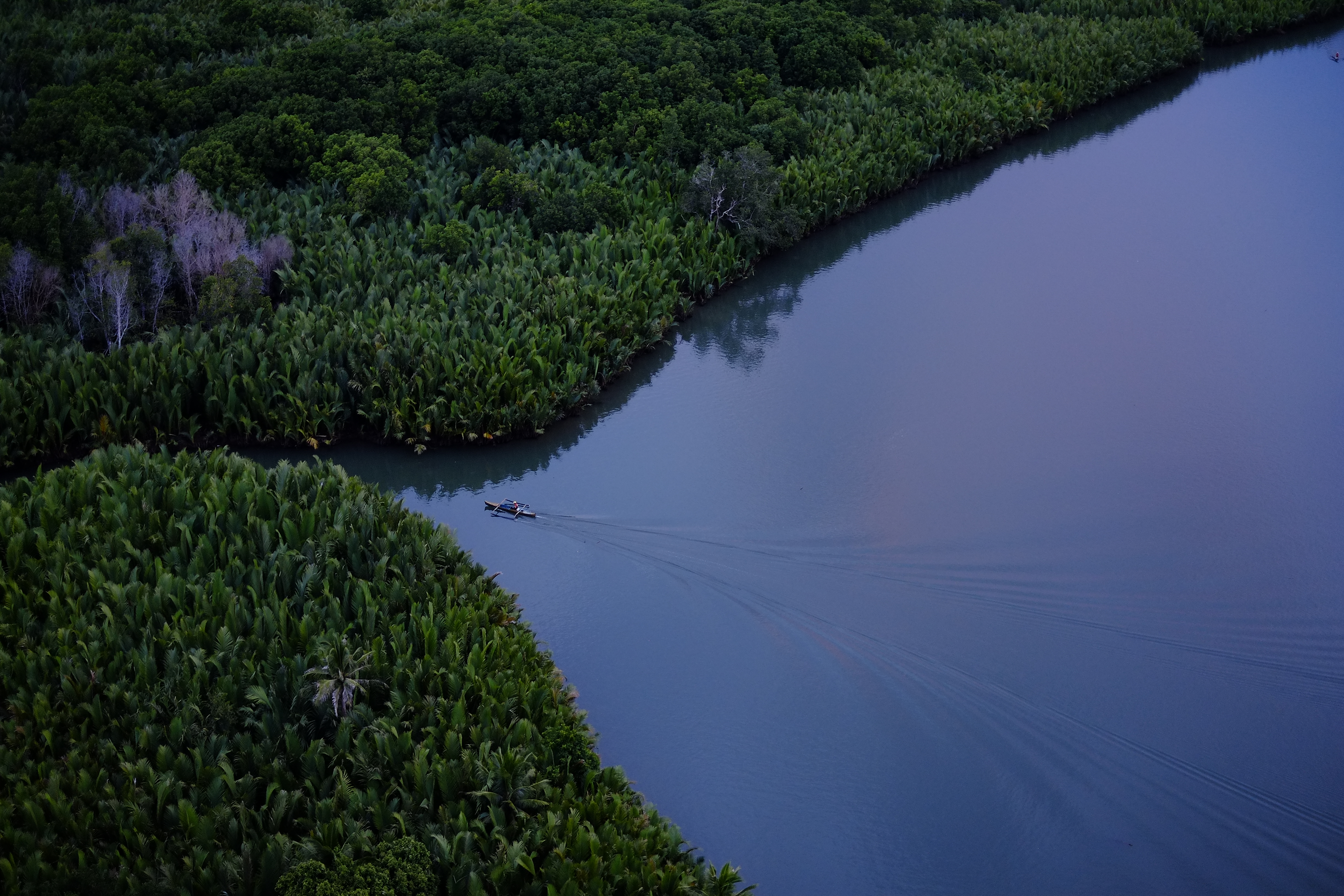

- Location within Philippines
- Location: Baliangao, Misamis Occidental, Philippines
- Nearest city: Dapitan
- Coordinates: 8°37′14″N 123°38′8″E
- Area: 294.10 ha (726.7 acres)
- Established: November 22, 2000
- Governing body: Department of Environment and Natural Resources

The Baliangao Protected Landscape and Seascape is a wetland conservation area along the coast of Danao Bay in northern Misamis Occidental, Philippines. Situated on the territory of the Misom, Sinian, Tugas, and Landing barangays in the municipality of Baliangao, it covers 294.10 hectares (726.7 acres) of terrestrial and marine areas consisting of mangrove, sea grass and coral reef ecosystems. The protected area also includes a portion of Sinian River which drains into Danao Bay. It was established in 2000 through Proclamation No. 418.

== Description ==
The Baliangao protected area occupies the shallow embayment known as Danao Bay which is an arm of the Bohol Sea near the provincial border with Zamboanga del Norte. It is the site of the old Misom Sea Sanctuary established in 1991 by the local government in partnership with Pipuli Foundation to protect its rich marine life. It was also earlier named the Baliangao Wetland Park after the rich mangrove forest of the Sinian River and eastern coast was incorporated into the area. Its coast is fringed by coral reefs which serves as a barrier and protection for the mangrove forest against strong waves. Its seascape is dominated by seagrasses and seaweeds.

Baliangao is also home to at least 21 mangrove species, dominated by the Rhizophora (bakawan) variety. It provides shelter and nesting grounds for several waterbird species including the olive-backed sunbird, Philippine glossy starling, kingfisher, chestnut-breasted mannikin, black-capped oriole, spotted dove, brahminy kite, blue-capped woodpecker and common egret.
