= Ozamiz–Pagadian Road =

Road in the Philippines

Ozamiz–Pagadian Road

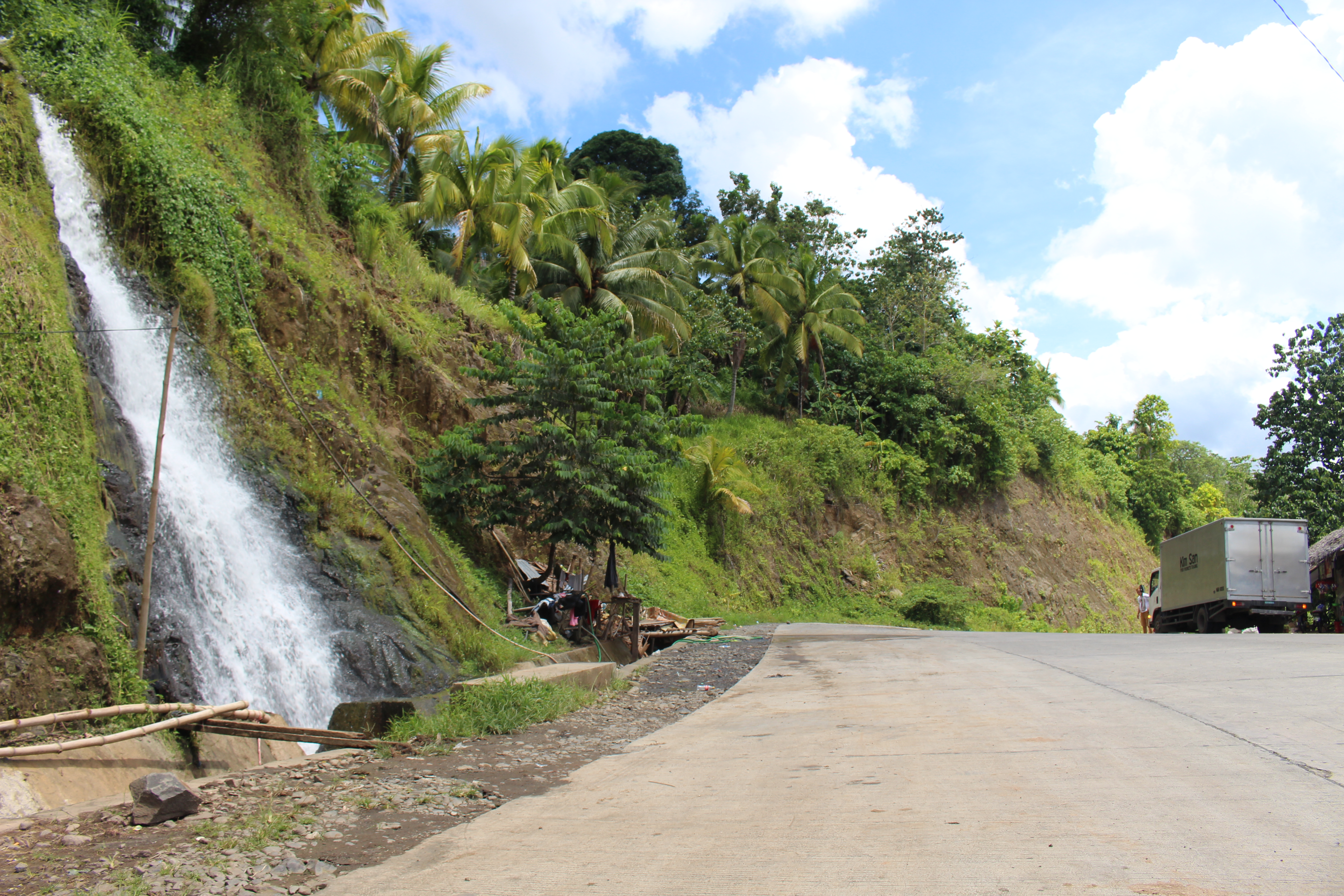
- Portion of the highway in Aurora-Ramon Magsaysay Border

Route information
- Maintained by Department of Public Works and Highways
- Length: 82 km (51 mi)
- Component highways: N78

Major junctions
- North end: N79 (Ozamiz–Oroquieta Road) at Ozamiz
- N80 (Molave–Dipolog Road)
- South end: N9 (Butuan–Cagayan de Oro–Iligan Road) at Aurora

Location
- Country: Philippines
- Provinces: Misamis Occidental, Zamboanga del Sur
- Major cities: Ozamiz, Tangub
- Towns: Bonifacio, Tambulig, Molave, Ramon Magsaysay, Aurora

Highway system
- Roads in the Philippines; Highways; Expressways; List
← N77	→ N79

The Ozamiz–Pagadian Road, also known as Aurora–Ozamiz Road, is a 70-kilometer (43 mi) two-to-four lane road network connecting the cities of Ozamiz in Misamis Occidental and Pagadian in Zamboanga del Sur. It traverses through Tangub and the municipality of Bonifacio at Misamis Occidental and the municipalities of Tambulig, Molave, Ramon Magsaysay, and Aurora at Zamboanga del Sur.

The entire highway is designated as National Route 78 (N78) of the Philippine highway network.
