= Santa Teresita, Cagayan =

Municipality in Cagayan, Philippines

Santa Teresita
- Municipality
- Municipality of Santa Teresita
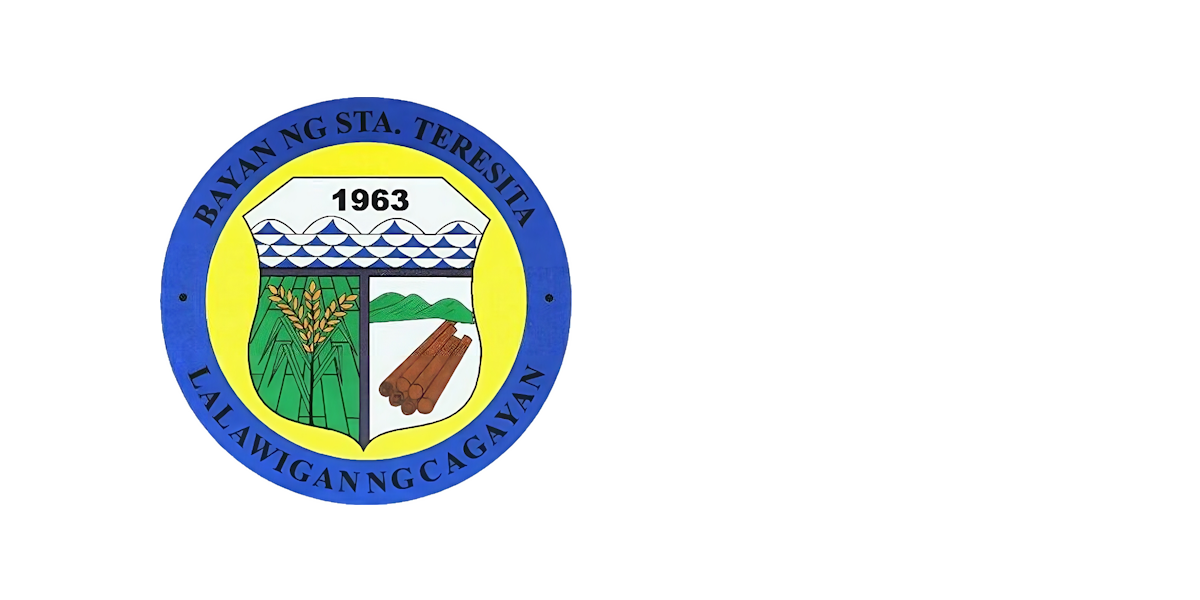
- Flag
- Nicknames: Vannamei Capital of the Philippines; Youngest Town of Cagayan
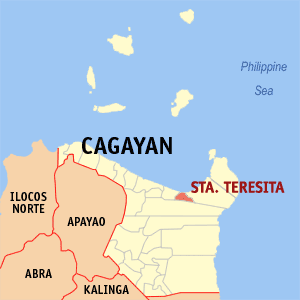
- Map of Cagayan with Santa Teresita highlighted
- Interactive map of Santa Teresita
- Location within the Philippines
- Coordinates: 18°15′07″N 121°54′36″E
- Country: Philippines
- Region: Cagayan Valley
- Province: Cagayan
- District: 1st district
- Barangays: 13 (see Barangays)

Government
  - Type: Sangguniang Bayan
  - Mayor: Atty. Rodrigo P. De Gracia
  - Vice Mayor: Ruben P. Fagela
  - Representative: Ramon C. Nolasco Jr.
  - Electorate: 12,090 voters (2025)

Area
  - Total: 166.98 km^{2} (64.47 sq mi)
- Elevation: 16 m (52 ft)
- Highest elevation: 115 m (377 ft)
- Lowest elevation: 0 m (0 ft)

Population (2024 census)
  - Total: 19,476
  - Density: 116.64/km^{2} (302.09/sq mi)
  - Households: 4,926

Economy
  - Income class: 3rd municipal income class
  - Poverty incidence: 7% (2023)
  - Revenue: ₱ 161.4 million (2024)
  - Assets: ₱ 379.8 million (2024)
  - Expenditure: ₱ 139.1 million (2024)
  - Liabilities: ₱ 77.77 million (2024)

Service provider
  - Electricity: Cagayan 2 Electric Cooperative (CAGELCO 2)
- Time zone: UTC+8 (PST)
- ZIP code: 3512
- PSGC: 0201525000
- IDD : area code: +63 (0)78
- Native languages: Ibanag; Ilocano; Tagalog

Santa Teresita, officially the Municipality of Santa Teresita (Ibanag: Ili nat Santa Teresita; Ilocano: Ili ti Santa Teresita; Tagalog: Bayan ng Santa Teresita), is a municipality in the province of Cagayan, Philippines. According to the 2024 census, it has a population of 19,476 people.

== Geography ==
Santa Teresita is situated 106.76 kilometres (66.34 mi) from the provincial capital Tuguegarao, and 591.91 kilometres (367.80 mi) from the country's capital city of Manila.

=== Barangays ===
Santa Teresita is politically subdivided into 13 barangays. Each barangay consists of puroks while some have sitios.

- Alucao
- Buyun
- Centro East (Poblacion)
- Centro West
- Dungeg
- Luga
- Masi
- Mission
- Simpatuyo
- Villa
- Aridawen
- Caniugan
- Simbaluca

=== Climate ===
Climate data for Santa Teresita, Cagayan
Month	Jan	Feb	Mar	Apr	May	Jun	Jul	Aug	Sep	Oct	Nov	Dec	Year
Mean daily maximum °C (°F)	24 (75)	26 (79)	28 (82)	31 (88)	31 (88)	31 (88)	30 (86)	30 (86)	29 (84)	28 (82)	26 (79)	25 (77)	28 (83)
Mean daily minimum °C (°F)	21 (70)	21 (70)	21 (70)	23 (73)	24 (75)	24 (75)	24 (75)	24 (75)	24 (75)	23 (73)	23 (73)	22 (72)	23 (73)
Average precipitation mm (inches)	150 (5.9)	106 (4.2)	84 (3.3)	48 (1.9)	103 (4.1)	115 (4.5)	134 (5.3)	156 (6.1)	136 (5.4)	240 (9.4)	246 (9.7)	300 (11.8)	1,818 (71.6)
Average rainy days	19	14.3	12.8	10.8	17.7	18.9	21.5	23.3	22.1	20.4	20.3	22.2	223.3
Source: Meteoblue

== Demographics ==
Population census of Santa Teresita

Year	Pop.	±% p.a.
1970	8,569	—
1975	9,635	+2.38%
1980	10,147	+1.04%
1990	11,557	+1.31%
1995	12,566	+1.58%
2000	13,804	+2.03%

Year	Pop.	±% p.a.
2007	16,578	+2.56%
2010	17,600	+2.20%
2015	19,038	+1.51%
2020	19,573	+0.59%
2024	19,476	−0.12%

Source: Philippine Statistics Authority

Based on the 2024 census, the population of Santa Teresita was 19,476 people, with a density of 120 inhabitants per square kilometre or 310 inhabitants per square mile.

== Economy ==
Poverty incidence of Santa Teresita (%)

Source: Philippine Statistics Authority

Bakong (Hanguana malayana) is abundant in Santa Teresita. The aquatic plant grows to three meters and is used to make pulp, yarn, bioplastics, textile, clothing, accessories, furniture and paper handicrafts.

== Government ==
=== Local government ===
Santa Teresita is part of the first legislative district of the province of Cagayan. It is governed by a mayor, designated as its local chief executive, and by a municipal council as its legislative body in accordance with the Local Government Code. The mayor, vice mayor, and the municipal councilors are elected directly by the people through an election held every three years.

=== Elected officials ===
Members of the Municipal Council (2019–2022)
Position	Name
Congressman	Ramon C. Nolasco Jr.
Mayor	Rodrigo P. De Gracia
Vice-Mayor	Ruben P. Fagela
Councilors	Jeffereson M. Javier
Councilors	William A. Lorenzo
Councilors	Mark Anthony P. Palor
Councilors	Conrado P. Tabaco
Councilors	Gloria O. Baldiviso
Councilors	Rhudel A. Castillo
Councilors	Jose I. Gonzaga
Councilors	Jethro S. Tibuc

== Education ==
The Schools Division of Cagayan governs the town's public education system. The division office is a field office of the DepEd in Cagayan Valley region. The Sta. Teresita Schools District Office governs the public and private elementary and high schools throughout the municipality.

=== Primary and elementary schools ===
- Alucao Elementary School
- Aridowen Elementary School
- Bangalao Elementary School
- Buyun Elementary School
- Caniugan Elementary School
- Dungeg Elementary School
- Luga Elementary School
- Masi Elementary School
- Mission Elementary School
- Simbaluca Elementary School
- Simpatuyo Elementary School
- Sta. Teresita Central School
- Villa Elementary School

=== Secondary schools ===
- Luga National High School
- St. Francis Academy
- Sta. Teresita National High School
