= Baliangao =

Municipality in Misamis Occidental, Philippines

- Municipality
- Municipality of Baliangao
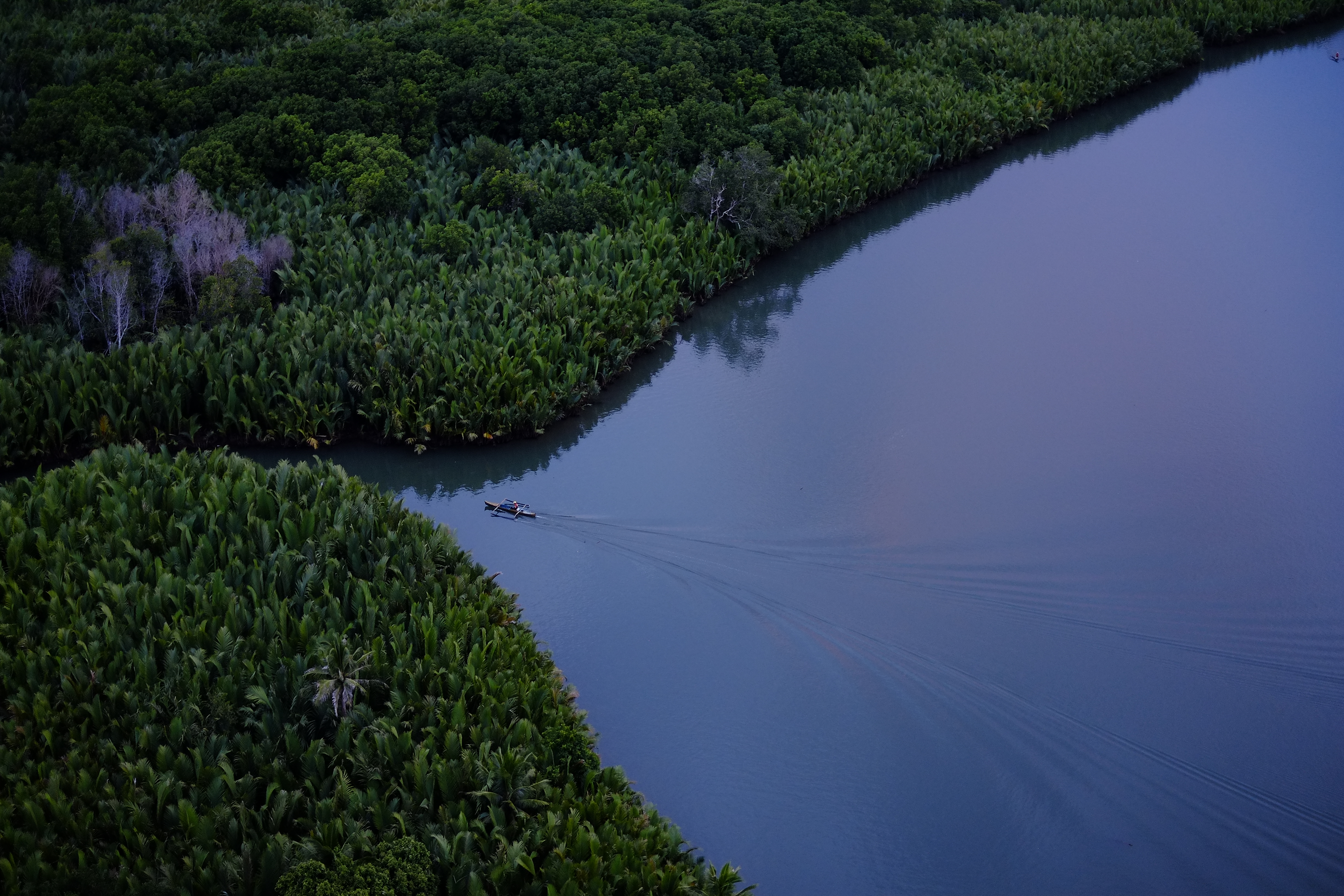
- The Baliangao Protected Landscape and Seascape

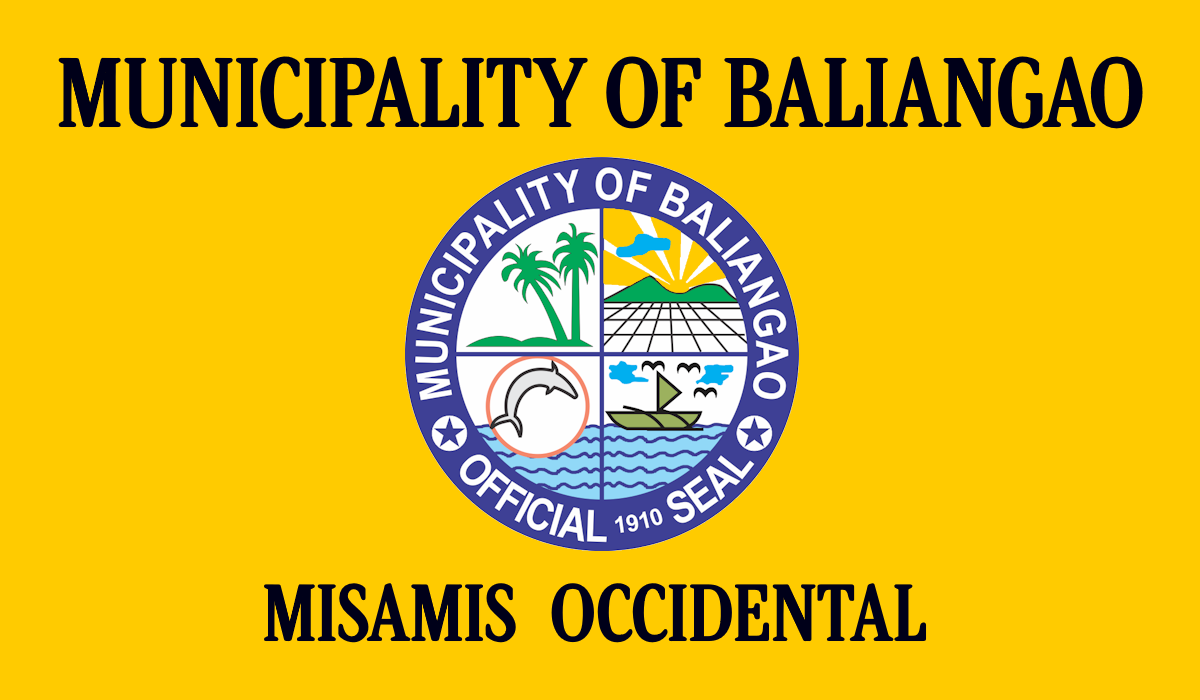
- Flag

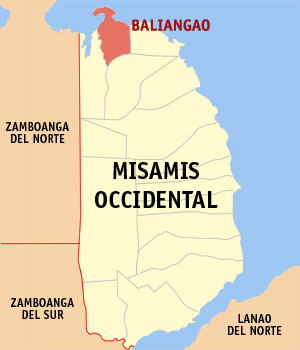
- Map of Misamis Occidental with Baliangao highlighted
- Interactive map of Baliangao
- Location within the Philippines
- Coordinates: 8°40′N 123°36′E
- Country: Philippines
- Region: Northern Mindanao
- Province: Misamis Occidental
- District: 1st district
- Founded: August 10, 1909
- Barangays: 15 (see Barangays)

Government
  - Type: Sangguniang Bayan
  - Mayor: Golda Catherine June Y. Resma (ASPIN)
  - Vice Mayor: Agne V. Yap Sr. (ASPIN)
  - Representative: Jason P. Almonte (NP)
  - Municipal Council: Members: Nikki Marie B. Serenio; Rodulph O. Tan; Carmel Olive R. Bueno; Jonie J. Lomoljo; Ambisionado C. Gabrinez; Carlos C. Apiag; Gerardo V. Ahat; Gerpe V. Garay
  - Electorate: 11,906 voters (2025)

Area
  - Total: 81.72 km^{2} (31.55 sq mi)
- Elevation: 4.0 m (13.1 ft)
- Highest elevation: 111 m (364 ft)
- Lowest elevation: 0 m (0 ft)

Population (2024 census)
  - Total: 18,500
  - Density: 226/km^{2} (586/sq mi)
  - Households: 4,861

Economy
  - Income class: 4th municipal income class
  - Poverty incidence: 34.02% (2023)
  - Revenue: ₱ 118.4 million (2024)
  - Assets: ₱ 300 million (2024)
  - Expenditure: ₱ 63.13 million (2024)
  - Liabilities: ₱ 73.66 million (2024)

Service provider
  - Electricity: Misamis Occidental 1 Electric Cooperative (MOELCI 1)
- Time zone: UTC+8 (PST)
- ZIP code: 7211
- PSGC: 1004202000
- IDD : area code: +63 (0)88
- Native languages: Subanon; Cebuano; Tagalog
- Website: www.baliangao.gov.ph

Baliangao, officially the Municipality of Baliangao (Cebuano: Lungsod sa Baliangao; Tagalog: Bayan ng Baliangao), is a municipality in the province of Misamis Occidental, Philippines. According to the 2024 census, it has a population of 18,500 people.

The Baliangao Protected Landscape and Seascape area is located within the municipality.

== Geography ==
=== Barangays ===
Baliangao is politically subdivided into 15 barangays. Each barangay consists of puroks while some have sitios.

- Del Pilar
- Landing
- Lumipac
- Lusot
- Mabini
- Magsaysay
- Misom
- Mitacas
- Naburos
- Northern Poblacion
- Punta Miray
- Punta Sulong
- Sinian
- Southern Poblacion
- Tugas

=== Climate ===
Climate data for Baliangao, Misamis Occidental
Month	Jan	Feb	Mar	Apr	May	Jun	Jul	Aug	Sep	Oct	Nov	Dec	Year
Mean daily maximum °C (°F)	28 (82)	28 (82)	29 (84)	31 (88)	31 (88)	30 (86)	30 (86)	30 (86)	30 (86)	30 (86)	29 (84)	28 (82)	30 (85)
Mean daily minimum °C (°F)	23 (73)	23 (73)	23 (73)	23 (73)	24 (75)	24 (75)	24 (75)	24 (75)	24 (75)	24 (75)	24 (75)	23 (73)	24 (74)
Average precipitation mm (inches)	69 (2.7)	44 (1.7)	37 (1.5)	29 (1.1)	87 (3.4)	137 (5.4)	131 (5.2)	141 (5.6)	143 (5.6)	134 (5.3)	68 (2.7)	53 (2.1)	1,073 (42.3)
Average rainy days	9.9	7.6	7.4	8.1	21.6	26.5	26.4	26.6	25.8	24.3	15.1	10.4	209.7
Source: Meteoblue

== Demographics ==
Population census of Baliangao

Year	Pop.	±% p.a.
1918	6,325	—
1939	15,810	+4.46%
1948	19,822	+2.54%
1960	9,133	−6.25%
1970	11,086	+1.95%
1975	11,645	+0.99%
1980	11,938	+0.50%
1990	13,562	+1.28%

Year	Pop.	±% p.a.
1995	13,139	−0.59%
2000	14,552	+2.21%
2007	14,927	+0.35%
2010	16,155	+2.92%
2015	17,092	+1.08%
2020	18,433	+1.60%
2024	18,500	+0.09%

Source: Philippine Statistics Authority

In the 2024 census, the population of Baliangao was 18,500 people, with a density of 230 inhabitants per square kilometre or 600 inhabitants per square mile.

== Economy ==
Poverty incidence of Baliangao (%)

Source: Philippine Statistics Authority
