= Bacolod North Road =

Highway in Negros Occidental, Philippines

Bacolod North Road

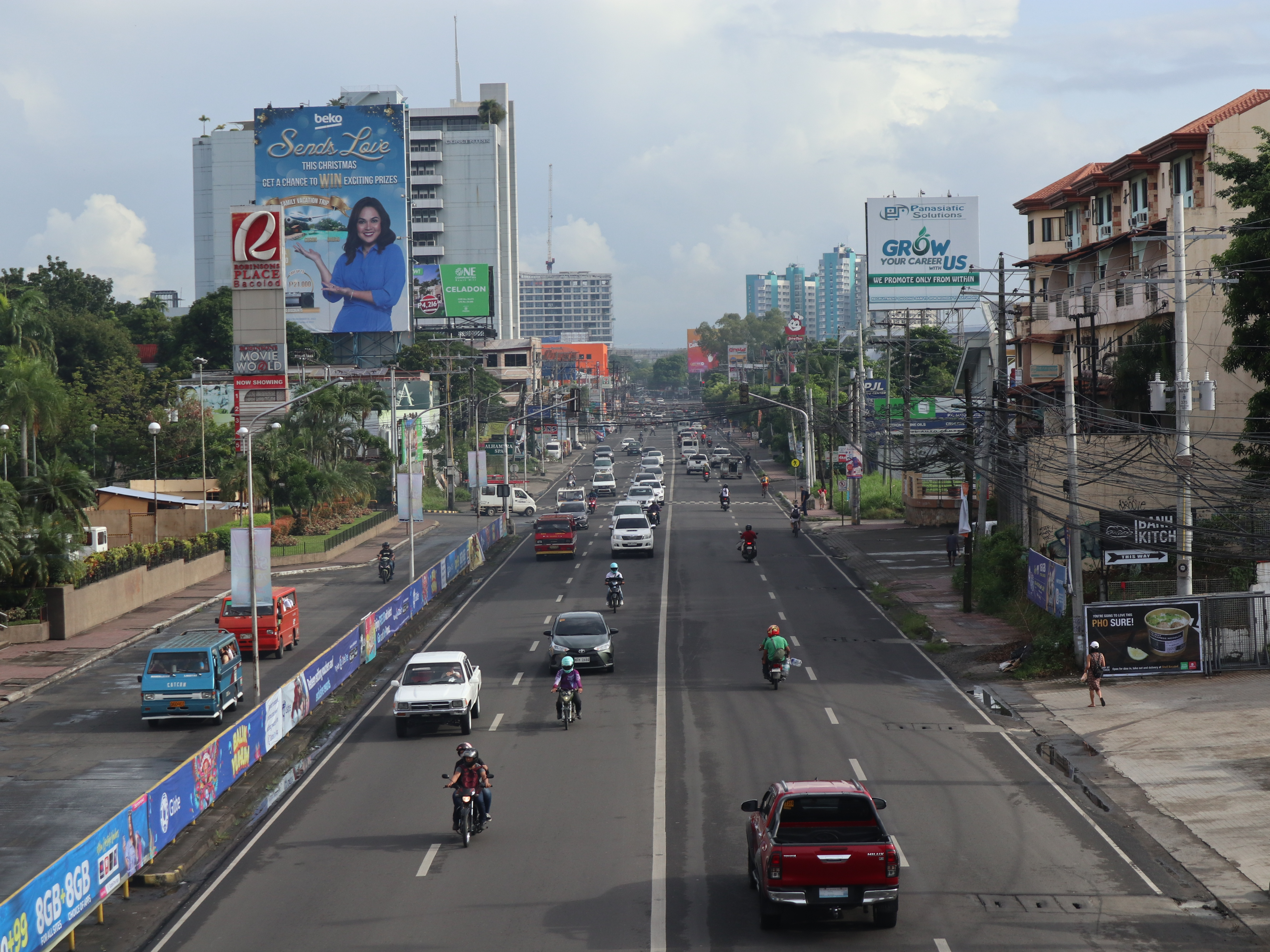
- Bacolod North Road as Lacson Street in Mandalagan, Bacolod

Route information
- Maintained by the Department of Public Works and Highways
- Length: 163.52 km (101.61 mi)
- Component highways: N7

Major junctions
- Northwest end: N7 (Bacolod South Road) in Bacolod
- N701 / N702 (Bacolod Circumferential Road) in Bacolod; N703 (Silay−Lantawan Road) in Silay; N704 (Sagay−Bato−Dian−Marcelo−Balea Road) in Sagay; N705 (Vito Port Road) in Sagay; N706 (Old Escalante Road (East Avenue)) in Escalante; N708 (Benedicto–Calatrava Road) in Calatrava; N69 (Negros Occidental Eco-Tourism Highway) in San Carlos
- Southeast end: N7 (Dumaguete North Road) at the Negros Occidental–Negros Oriental boundary

Location
- Country: Philippines
- Provinces: Negros Occidental
- Major cities: Bacolod, Talisay, Silay, Victorias, Cadiz, Sagay, Escalante, San Carlos
- Towns: Enrique B. Magalona, Manapla, Toboso, Calatrava

Highway system
- Roads in the Philippines; Highways; Expressways; List
← N6	→ N8

The Bacolod North Road is a 163.52-kilometer (101.61 mi), two-to-six lane major north–south lateral highway that connects the city of Bacolod to the city of San Carlos in Negros Occidental, Philippines.

The road is a component of National Route 7 (N7) of the Philippine highway network and the Western Nautical Highway of the Philippine Nautical Highway System.

== Route description ==
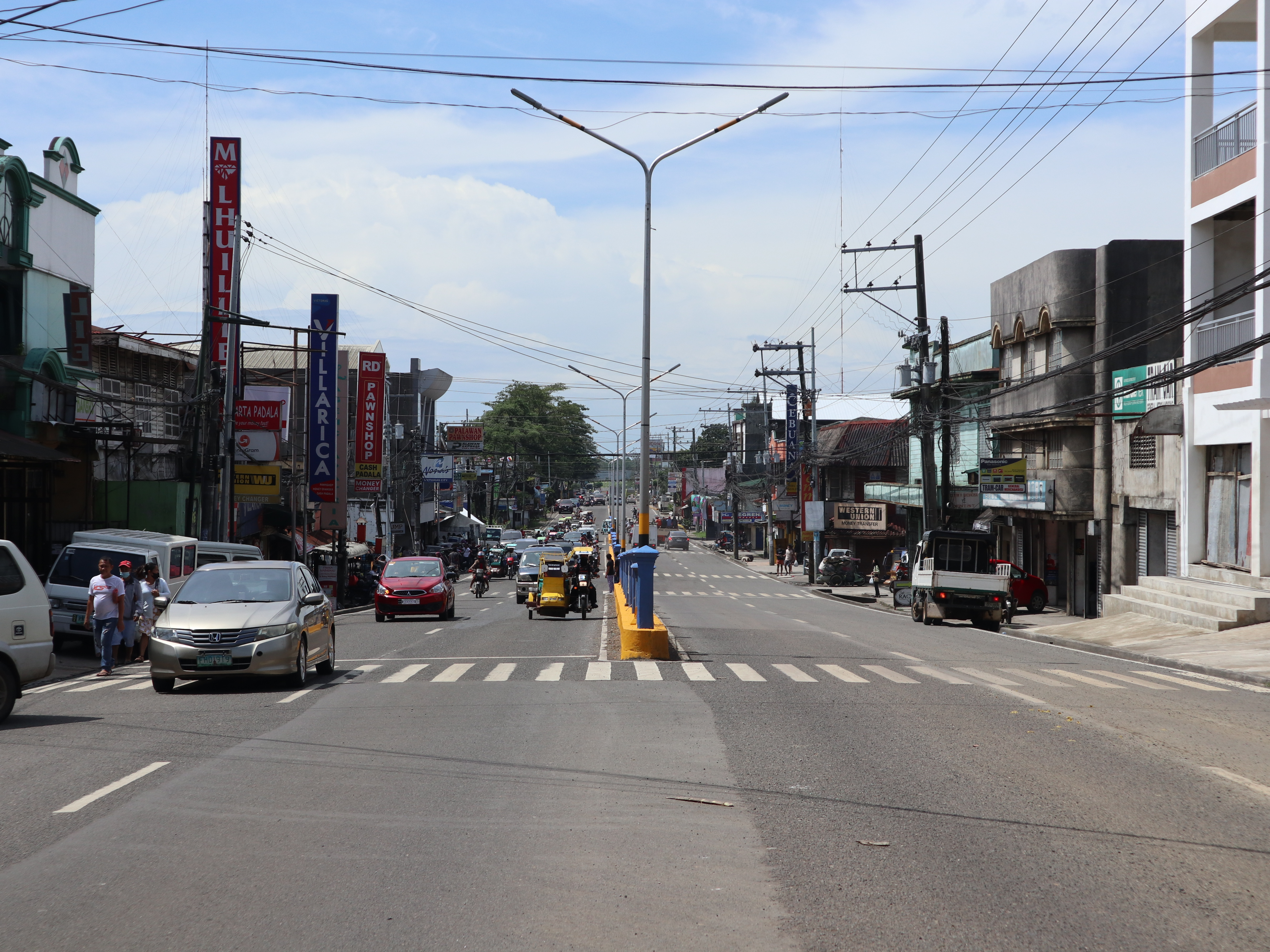
The road in Victorias

True to its name, the road connects Bacolod downtown to the northern and eastern coastal municipalities and cities of Negros Occidental up to San Carlos, where the province also shares its boundary with Negros Oriental.

The road starts at the kilometer zero of Negros Occidental in front of the Negros Occidental Provincial Capitol in downtown Bacolod as a continuation of Bacolod South Road. There, it assumes the local name Lacson Street and is part of N7. It then traverses Talisay (where it is locally known as Mabini Street and briefly splits into two as it crosses Catabla River), Silay (where it is locally known as Rizal Street), E. B. Magalona, Victorias (locally known as Osmeña Avenue), Manapla, Cadiz, Sagay, Escalante (where it turns west at the Escalante City Rotonda), Toboso, Calatrava, and finally San Carlos. In the San Carlos city proper, it is locally known as C.J. Ledesma Avenue. The road terminates approximately at the provincial boundary with Negros Oriental, where it is continued by Dumaguete North Road.

== History ==
The road was historically part of Highway 1 that inscribed Negros incompletely. A new bypass road in Manapla was later built and forms the current alignment of the road.

== Intersections ==
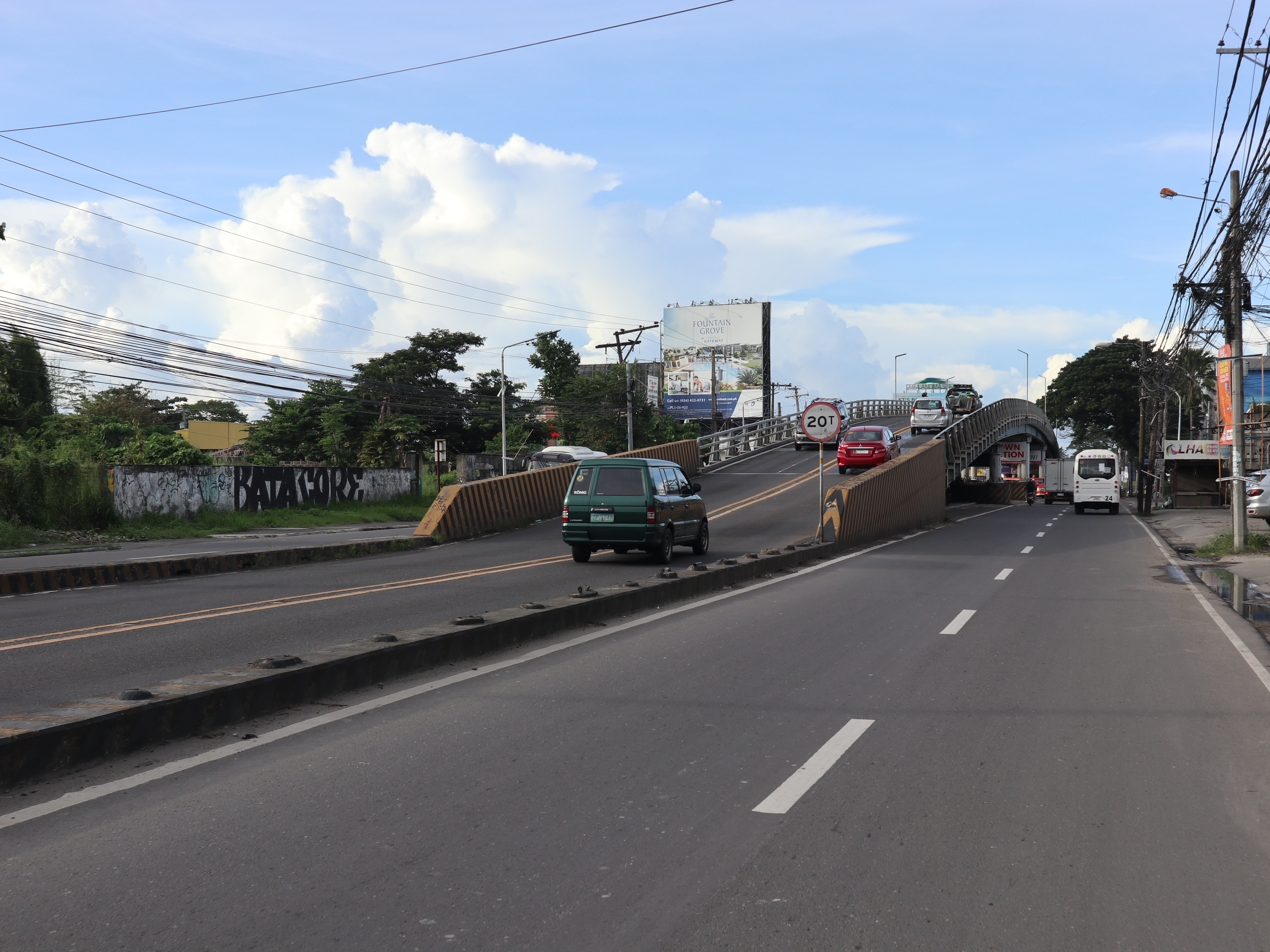
Bata Flyover in Bacolod carries Bacolod North Road's crossing traffic over Bacolod Circumferential Road

Intersections are numbered by kilometer post, with Negros Occidental Provincial Capitol in Bacolod designated as kilometer zero.

Province	City/Municipality	km	mi	Destinations	Notes
Bacolod		0	0.0	N6 (Bacolod South Road)	Northern terminus
Bacolod		3.4	2.1	N701 / N702 (Bacolod Circumferential Road)	Crossing traffic carried by Bata Flyover
Negros Occidental	Silay	14.1	8.8	N703 (Silay–Lantawan Road) / Jose Pitong Ledesma Street	Access to Bacolod–Silay Airport
Negros Occidental	Sagay	82.9	51.5	N704 (Jct Natl Rd Sagay-Bato-Dian-Marcelo-Balea Jct Road) / A.E. Marañon Street	
Negros Occidental	Sagay	91.9	57.1	N705 (Vito Port Road)	
Negros Occidental	Escalante	95	59	N706 (Jct. Balintawak–Old Escalante Road) / East Avenue	Escalante City Rotonda. Access to Escalante Port.
Negros Occidental	Calatrava	130	81	N708 (Jct. DS Benedicto–Spur 16–Calatrava Road) / Lopez Jaena Street	
Negros Occidental	San Carlos	145	90	N69 (Negros Occidental Eco-Tourism Highway)	
Negros Occidental – Negros Oriental boundary	San Carlos – Vallehermoso boundary	161	100	N7 (Dumaguete North Road)	Southern terminus
1.000 mi = 1.609 km; 1.000 km = 0.621 mi
