= Bais–Kabankalan Road =

Road in the Philippines

Bais–Kabankalan Road
- Kabankalan–Bais Road

Route information
- Maintained by Department of Public Works and Highways
- Length: 75.382 km (46.840 mi) Including 0.05 km (0.031 mi) spur in Kabankalan
- Component highways: N6

Major junctions
- West end: N6 / N712 (Bacolod South Road) in Kabankalan
- East end: N7 (Dumaguete North Road) in Bais

Location
- Country: Philippines
- Provinces: Negros Oriental and Negros Occidental
- Major cities: Bais and Kabankalan
- Towns: Mabinay

Highway system
- Roads in the Philippines; Highways; Expressways; List
← N5	→ N7

The Bais–Kabankalan Road or Kabankalan–Bais Road is a two-to-four lane 75.382-kilometer (46.840 mi) major road that connects the city of Bais in Negros Oriental to the city of Kabankalan in Negros Occidental. In Kabankalan, it is also known in the city proper as Aquiles-Zayco Avenue.

The road forms part of National Route 6 (N6) of the Philippine highway network and of the Western Nautical Highway of the Philippine Nautical Highway System. Its 50-meter (160 ft) spur at its western end in Kabankalan is also classified as an unnumbered, tertiary road.

== Intersections ==
Intersections are numbered by kilometer posts, with Negros Occidental Provincial Capitol in Bacolod, Negros Occidental, and Negros Oriental Provincial Capitol in Dumaguete, Negros Oriental being designated as kilometer zeros of their respective provinces. Kilometer numbers shown here are approximate values.

Province	City/Municipality	km	mi	Destinations	Notes
Negros Oriental	Bais	50.3	31.3	N7 (Dumaguete North Road)	
Negros Oriental	Mabinay	77.8	48.3	Bayawan–Mabinay Road	
Negros Oriental	Mabinay	94.3	58.6	Mabinay–Ayugon Road	
Negros Occidental	Kabankalan	88.3	54.9	N6 / N712 (Bacolod South Road)	Locally known as Guanzon Street
1.000 mi = 1.609 km; 1.000 km = 0.621 mi
