= Bacolod South Road =

Road in Negros Occidental, Philippines

Bacolod South Road
- Negros South Road
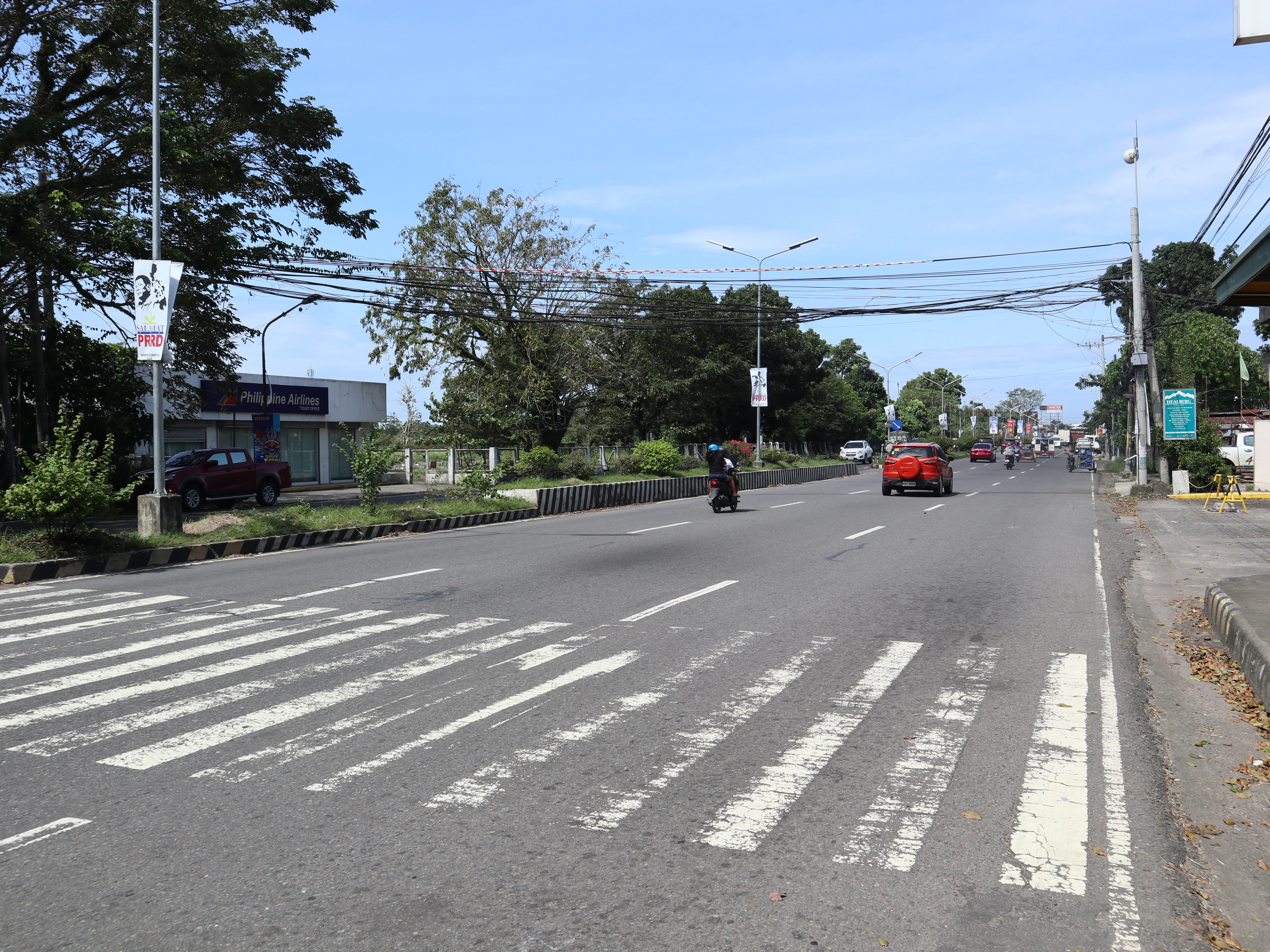
- Bacolod South Road as Araneta Avenue near the old Bacolod City Domestic Airport in Bacolod

Route information
- Maintained by Department of Public Works and Highways (DPWH)
- Length: 212.59 km (132.10 mi)
- Component highways: N7 in Bacolod; N6 from Bacolod to Kabankalan; N712 from Kabankalan to Hinoba-an

Major junctions
- North end: N7 (Bacolod North Road) in Bacolod
- N702 (Sto. Niño–Banago Road) in Bacolod; N69 (Bacolod–San Carlos Road) in Bacolod; N701 (Bacolod Circumferential Road) in Bacolod; N710 (Pontevedra Bypass Road) in San Enrique; N713 (Pulupandan Port Road) in Pulupandan; N710 (Hinigaran–Isabela Road) in Hinigaran; N6 (Bais–Kabankalan Road) in Kabankalan; N717 (Kabankalan–Bantayan Road) in Ilog
- South end: N712 (Dumaguete South Road) at the Negros Occidental–Negros Oriental boundary

Location
- Country: Philippines
- Provinces: Negros Occidental
- Major cities: Bacolod, Bago, Himamaylan, Kabankalan, Sipalay
- Towns: Valladolid, San Enrique, Pontevedra, Hinigaran, Binalbagan, Ilog, Cauayan, Hinoba-an

Highway system
- Roads in the Philippines; Highways; Expressways; List
← N5	→ N7

The Bacolod South Road, also known as Negros South Road, is a 212.59-kilometer (132.10 mi), two-to-six lane major north–south lateral highway that connects the city of Bacolod to the municipality of Hinoba-an in the province of Negros Occidental, Philippines.

The road forms part of National Route 7 (N7), National Route 6 (N6), and National Route 712 (N712) of the Philippine highway network and of the Western Nautical Highway of the Philippine Nautical Highway System.

== Route description ==
True to its name, the road connects Bacolod downtown to the southern municipalities and cities of Negros Occidental up to Hinoba-an, where the province also shares its boundary with Negros Oriental. Its segment from Bacolod to Kabankalan also forms part of the Western Nautical Highway of the Philippine Nautical Highway System.

=== Bacolod ===
The road starts at the kilometer zero of Negros Occidental in front of the Negros Occidental Provincial Capitol in Bacolod. There, the road assumes the local name Lacson Street and is part of N7 as it continues the Bacolod North Road. It then turns near the Bacolod City Plaza as Jose Rizal Street, Gatuslao Street, Gonzaga Street, and Araneta Avenue (beginning from its intersection with Sto. Niño–Banago Road, where Gonzaga Street continues), respectively. At the junction with Alijis Road, its route number changes from N7 to N6.

=== Bago to Kabankalan ===
In Bago, the road then turns away from the city proper and becomes also known as Bacolod South By-Pass Road, its newer right-of-way locally as R.M. Salas Drive. It then regains the Bacolod South Road name at Ubay Crossing past the Bago River. It continues its course along the western coast of Negros Occidental as it traverses Pulupandan, Valladolid, San Enrique, Pontevedra, Hinigaran, Binalbagan, Himamaylan, and Kabankalan, wherein from barangay Binicuil it is locally known as Guanzon Street. In the town propers of Pontevedra and Hinigaran, it is locally known in the town proper as Rizal Street.

=== Kabankalan to Hinoba-an ===
At its intersection with Bais–Kabankalan Road (Aquiles-Zayco Avenue) in Kabankalan city proper, the road's route number changes from N6 to N712, transitioning from a primary national road to a secondary national road, respectively. Shortly, it turns to the northeast locally known as Justice Y. Perez Avenue and continues its course along the western and southern coast of Negros Occidental. It terminates in Hinoba-an, near the provincial boundary with Negros Oriental, where it is continued by Dumaguete South Road.

== History ==
The road was historically part of Highway 1 that incompletely inscribed the Negros Island. After the World War II, the road was extended from its former southern terminius in Sojoton Point in Cauayan to Hinoba-an. Its right-of-way in Bago was also realigned through a new bypass road, away from the poblacion where it formerly traversed.

== Intersections ==
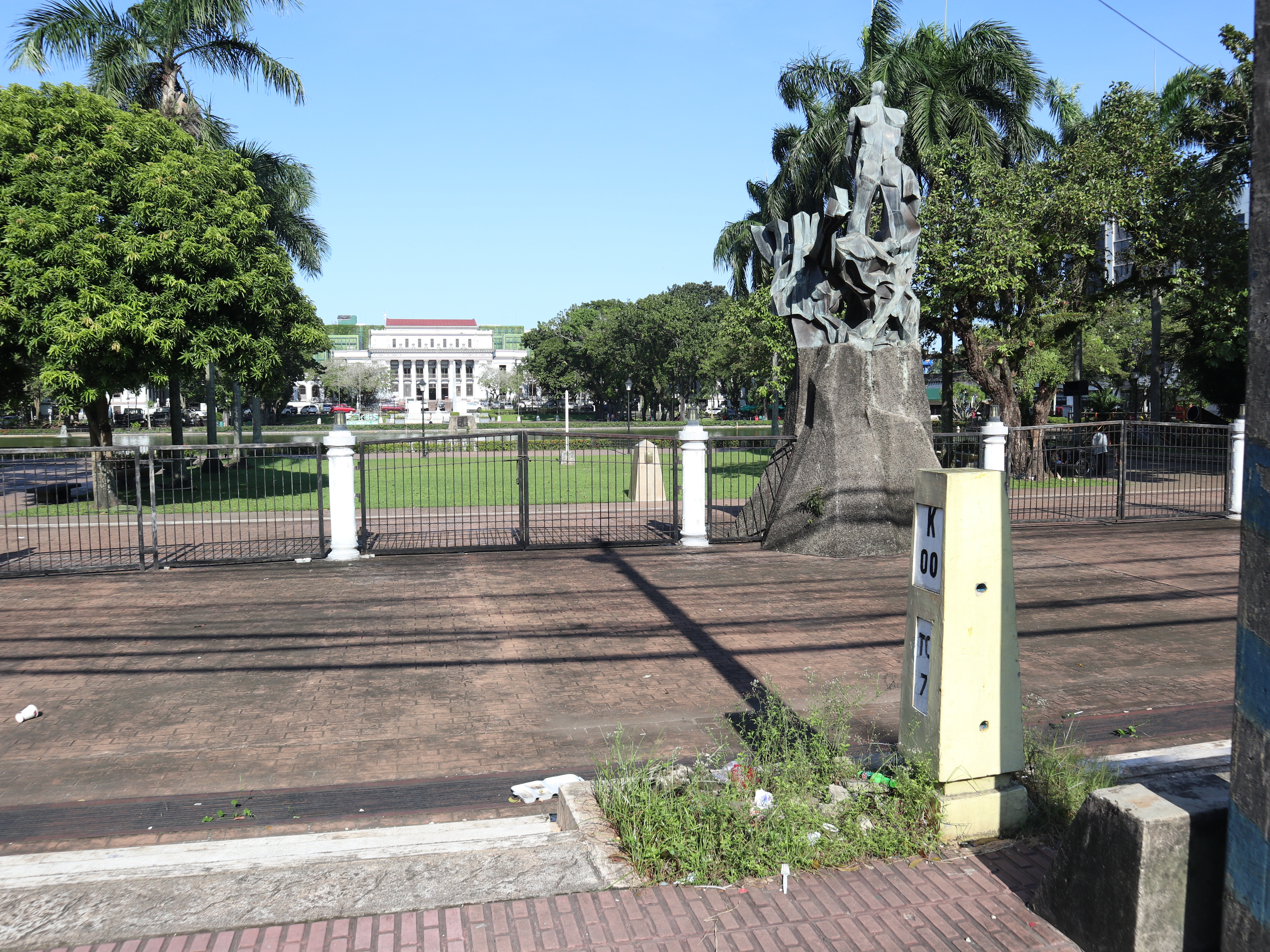
The Kilometer Zero of Negros Occidental in Bacolod marks the northern terminus of the road

Intersections are numbered by kilometer post, with Negros Occidental Provincial Capitol in Bacolod designated as kilometer zero.

Province	City/Municipality	km	mi	Destinations	Notes
Bacolod		0.000	0.000	N7 (Lacson Street)	Northern terminus
Bacolod		1.400	0.870	N702 (Gonzaga Street)	Route number change from N7 to N6.
Bacolod		4.085	2.538	N69 (Alijis Road)	Route number change from N7 to N6.
Bacolod		7.900	4.909	N701 (Bacolod Circumferential Road)	
Negros Occidental	San Enrique	36.120	22.444	N710 (Pontevedra Bypass Road)	
Negros Occidental	Hinigaran	52.400	32.560	N710 (Hinigaran–Isabela Road)	
Negros Occidental	Kabankalan	88.300	54.867	N6 (Aquiles-Zayco Avenue)	Route change from N6 to N712.
Negros Occidental	Ilog	91.600	56.918	N717 (Kabankalan–Bantayan Road)	
Negros Occidental	Hinoba-an	211.950	131.700	N712 (Dumaguete South Road)	Southern terminus
1.000 mi = 1.609 km; 1.000 km = 0.621 mi: Route transition

== See also ==
- Media related to Bacolod South Road at Wikimedia Commons
