= N7 highway =

Road in the Philippines

Route 7

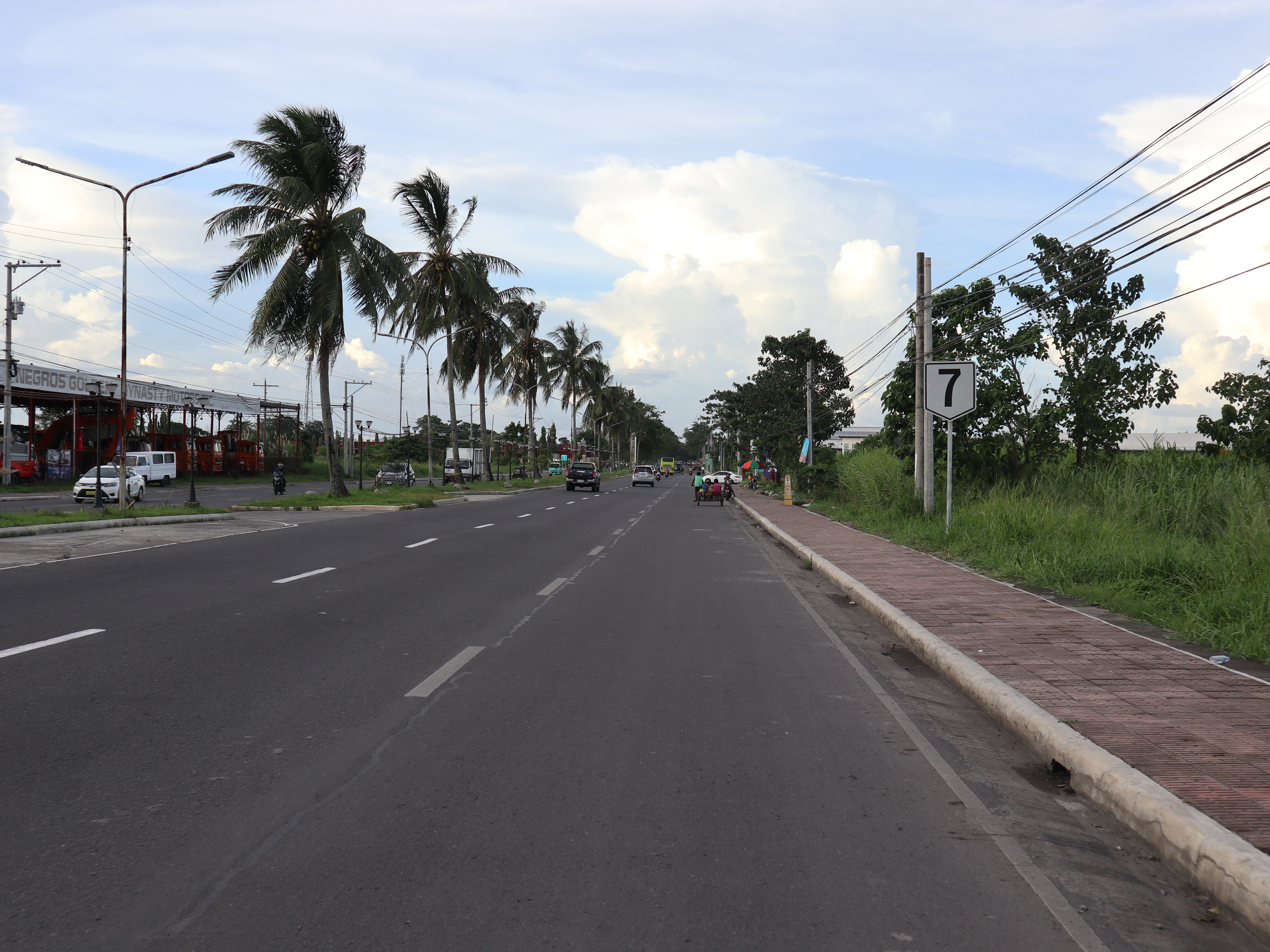
- N7 as Bacolod North Road in Bacolod

Route information
- Maintained by Department of Public Works and Highways (DPWH)
- Length: 398 km (247 mi)

Major junctions
- North end: N6 (Bacolod South Road) / N69 in Bacolod
- N702 (Santo Niño−Banago Road in Bacolod); N7 (Bacolod North Road) in Bacolod; N702 (Bacolod Circumferential Road in Bacolod) / N701; N703 (Silay−Lantawan Road) in Silay N704 (Sagay−Bato−Dian−Marcelo−Balea Junction Road) in Sagay; N705 (Vito Port Road) in Sagay; N69 (Negros Occidental Eco-Tourism Highway) in San Carlos, Negros Occidental; N7 (Dumaguete North Road) in Vallehermoso, Negros Oriental; N6 (Bais–Kabankalan Road) in Manjuyod; N715 (Dumaguete Airport Road) / N714 (Dumaguete Port Road) in Dumaguete; N711 (Santa Catalina–Pamplona–Tanjay City Road)
- South end: N712 (Dumaguete South Road) / N717 (Bayawan–Kabankalan Road) in Bayawan

Location
- Country: Philippines

Highway system
- Roads in the Philippines; Highways; Expressways; List
← N6	→ N8

National Route 7 (N7) is a 398-kilometer (247 mi), two to six lane, major primary route that forms part of the Philippine highway network, running from Bacolod to Bayawan in the island of Negros.

== Route description ==
=== Bacolod ===
The route starts at the intersection of N69 (Negros Occidental Eco-Tourism Highway / Alijis Road) and N6 (Bacolod South Road / Araneta Avenue), which it continues, in Bacolod, the capital city of Negros Occidental. It then heads north towards downtown Bacolod.

=== Bacolod to San Carlos ===
The route continues north as Bacolod North Road from the Negros Occidental kilometer 0 in front of the Negros Occidental Provincial Capitol onwards. It traverses several municipalities and cities in the northern and eastern part of the province. After reaching the boundary of Negros Occidental and Negros Oriental, the road ends and turns to Dumaguete North Road.

=== Vallehermoso to Dumaguete ===
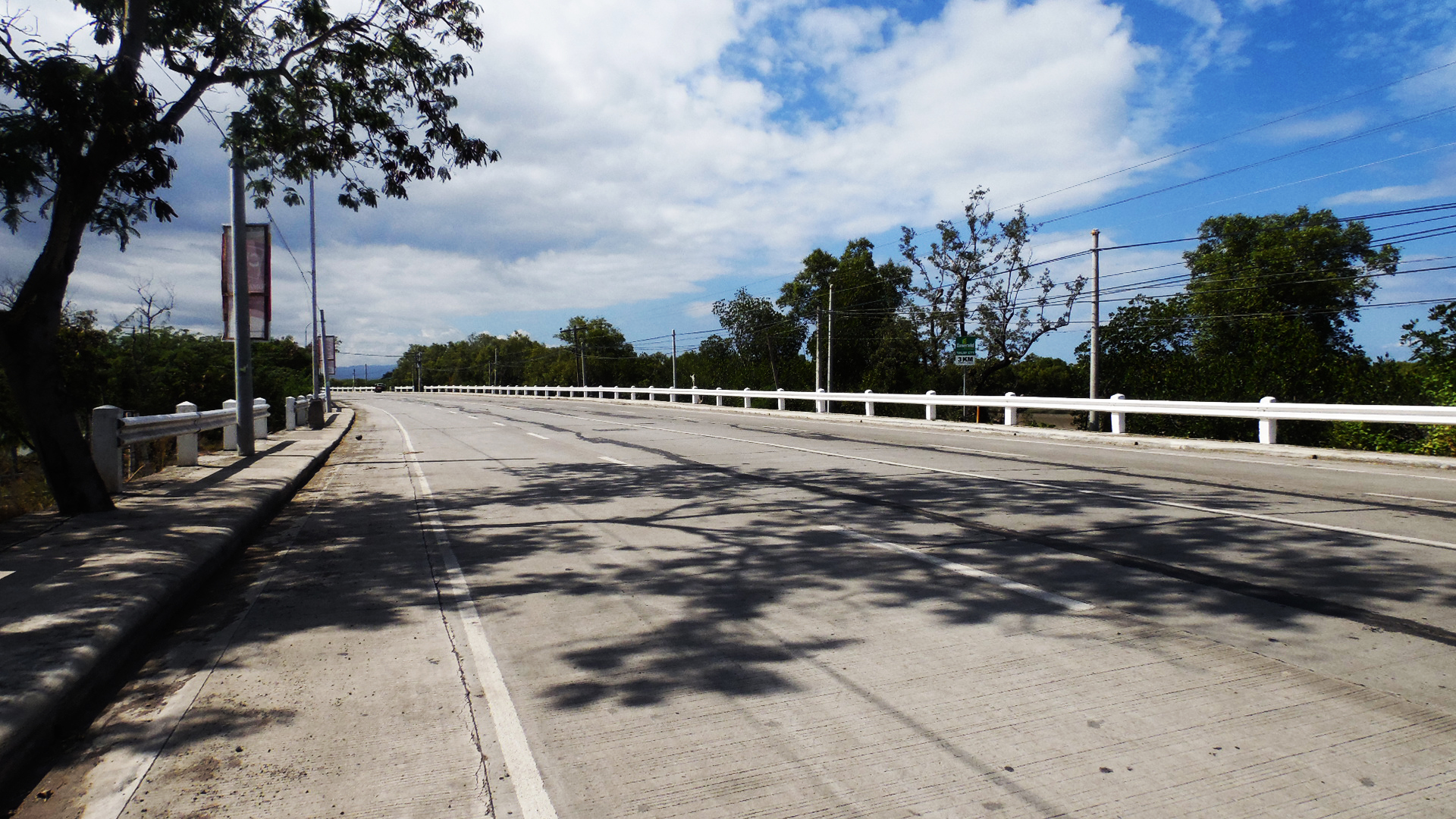
N7 in Tanjay

The route continues as Dumaguete North Road from the provincial boundary of Negros Oriental onwards. Mostly a straight road with turns and curves, it traverses the eastern coastal towns and cities of Negros Oriental up to its provincial capital, Dumaguete.

=== Dumaguete to Bayawan ===
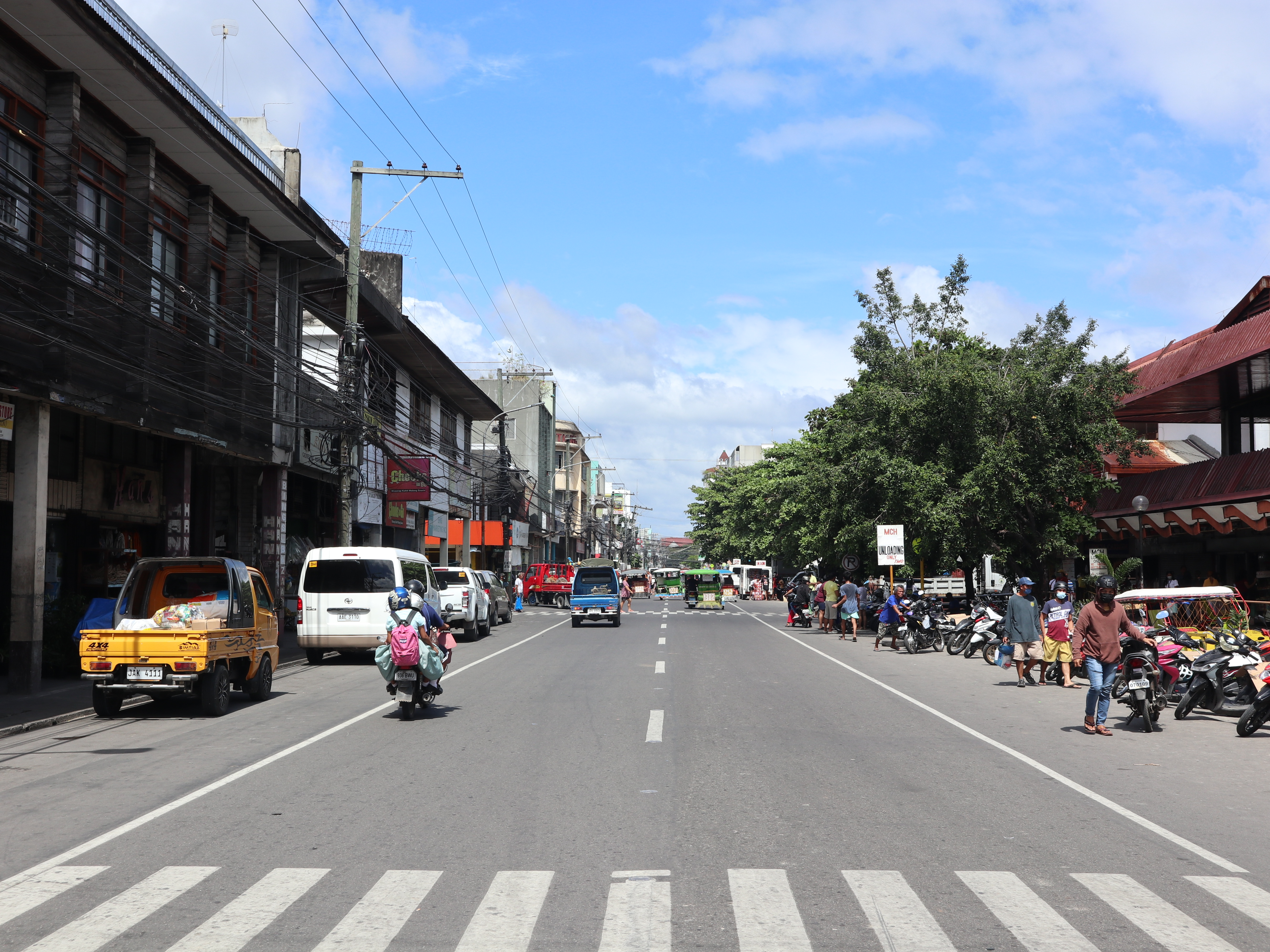
N7 as Mayor Ramon T. Pastor Street in Dumaguete

The route continues south as Dumaguete South Road from the Negros Oriental kilometer 0 in front of the Negros Oriental Provincial Capitol onwards. Unlike Dumaguete North Road, the direction is forward, which means the kilometer count is ascending. In the Dumaguete city proper, it splits into two one-way roads, i.e. Silliman Avenue and Governor Perdicles Street for southbound traffic and Real Street (Mayor Ramon T. Pastor Street) and Lamberto Macias Avenue for northbound traffic. It then traverses the southern and eastern coastal towns and cities of Negros Oriental up to Bayawan, where it ends at the intersection with N717 (Bayawan–Kabankalan Road) and N712, which continues Dumaguete South Road to the rest of the province.

== History ==
The direct predecessor of N7 is Highway 1 that inscribed Negros Island incompletely. Highway Routes were announced during 2014 as part of the new Philippine highway network.
