= N6 highway =

Road in the Philippines

Route 6

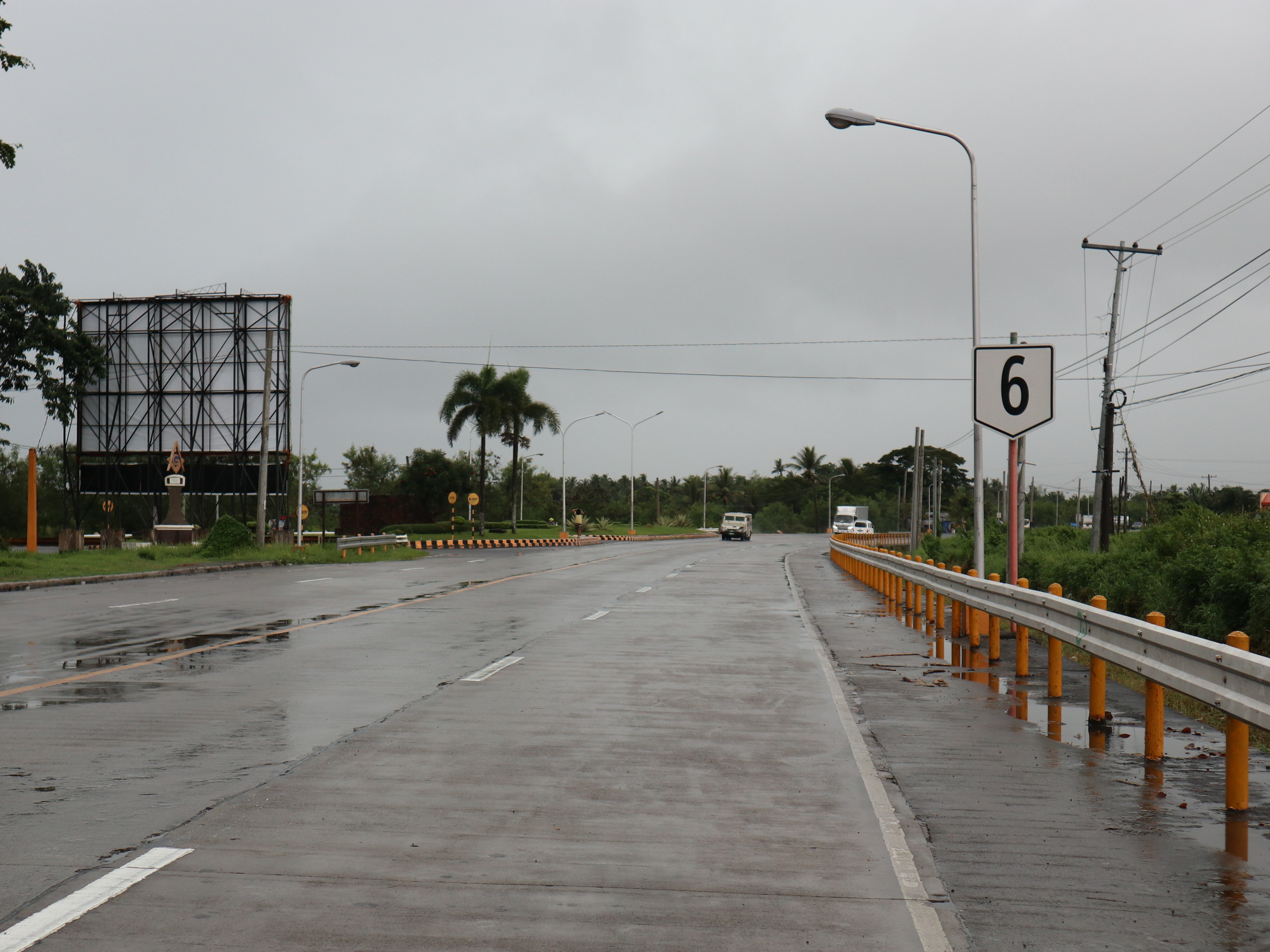
- N6 in Bago, Negros Occidental

Route information
- Maintained by Department of Public Works and Highways (DPWH)
- Length: 155 km (96 mi)

Major junctions
- North end: N7 (Bacolod South Road) / N69 (Bacolod–San Carlos Road) in Bacolod
- N701 (Bacolod Circumferential Road) in Bacolod; N713 (Pulupandan–Pulupandan Pier Road) in Pulupandan; N710 (San Enrique–Pontevedra Bypass Road) in San Enrique; N710 (Hinigaran–Isabela Road) in Hinigaran; N712 (Bacolod South Road) in Kabankalan
- South end: N7 (Dumaguete North Road) in Bais

Location
- Country: Philippines
- Provinces: Negros Occidental, Negros Oriental

Highway system
- Roads in the Philippines; Highways; Expressways; List
← N5	→ N7

National Route 6 (N6) is a 155-kilometer (96 mi) major primary national route that forms part of the Philippine highway network in the provinces of Negros Occidental and Negros Oriental.

== Route description ==
=== Bacolod to Kabankalan ===
The route starts at the junction of N7 (Bacolod South Road / Araneta Avenue) and N69 (Alijis Road / Bacolod–San Carlos Road) in Bacolod as Bacolod South Road. It continues N7, which terminates in Bacolod.

In Bago, the road then turns away from the poblacion and becomes also known as Bacolod South By-Pass Road and locally as R.M. Salas Drive. It then regains the Bacolod South Road name shortly after crossing the Bago River. It continues its course along the western coast of Negros Occidental up to Kabankalan, wherein from barangay Binicuil it is locally known as Guanzon Street.

=== Kabankalan to Bais ===
In Kabankalan poblacion, the route turns southeast as Bais–Kabankalan Road, which is locally known in the city as Aquiles-Zayco Avenue, as Bacolod South Road continues from the junction as N712. Traversing the mountain range of Negros Island, it then enters Negros Oriental at Mabinay, where the kilometer count changes because of the separate kilometer count among the two provinces. The road finally reaches the southern terminus at N7 (Dumaguete North Road) in Bais.
