= Don Salvador Benedicto =

Municipality in Negros Occidental, Philippines

Don Salvador Benedicto Salvador Benedicto
- Municipality
- Municipality of Don Salvador Benedicto
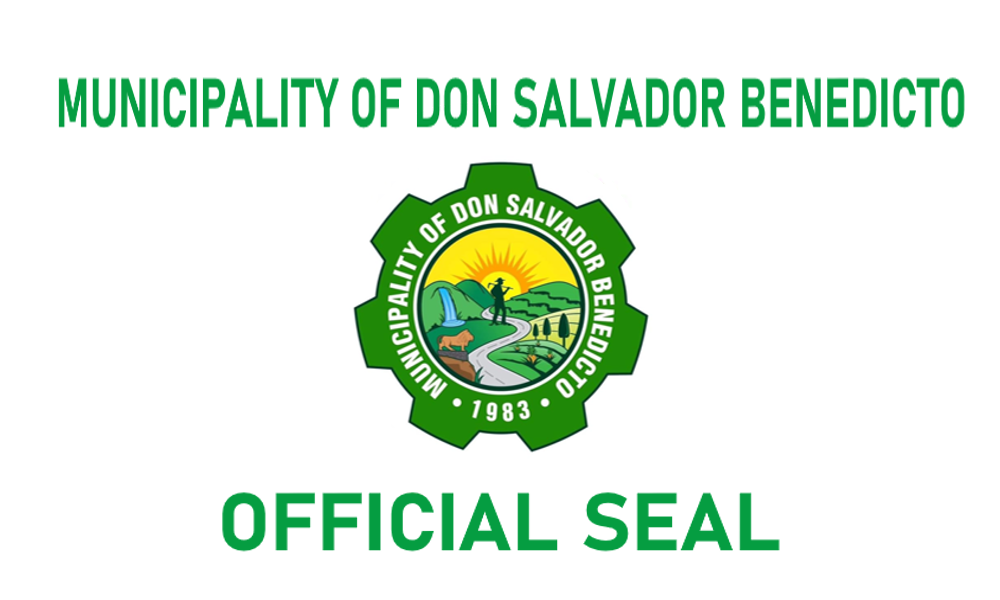
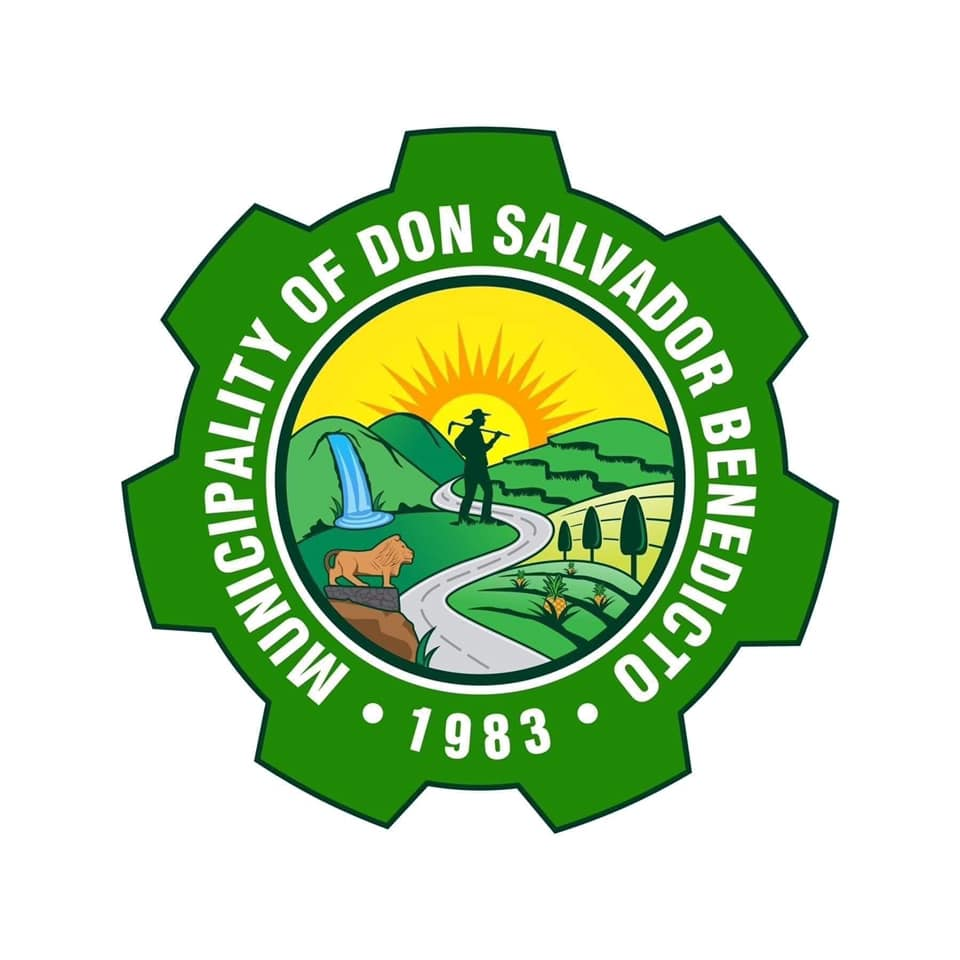
- Flag Seal
- Nickname: Summer Capital of Negros Occidental
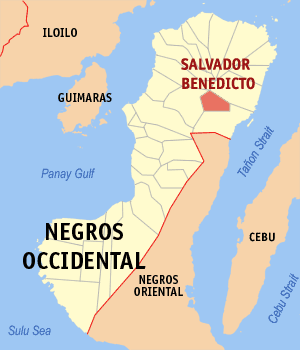
- Map of Negros Occidental with Don Salvador Benedicto highlighted
- Interactive map of Don Salvador Benedicto
- Location within the Philippines
- Coordinates: 10°33′02″N 123°14′11″E
- Country: Philippines
- Region: Negros Island Region
- Province: Negros Occidental
- District: 1st district
- Founded: February 9, 1983
- Named for: Vice Governor Salvador V. Benedicto
- Barangays: 7 (see Barangays)

Government
  - Type: Sangguniang Bayan
  - Mayor: Nehemiah Joe J. dela Cruz
  - Vice Mayor: Jugin Jewel L. Bandolon (NPC)
  - Representative: Julio A. Ledesma IV (NPC)
  - Municipal Council: Members: Roger M. Apellido, Sr.; Rogelio R. Asin; Henry E. Alcorin; Liezel B. Rebatado; Herman G. Badera, Jr.; Vicente B. Bacordo, Sr.; James Dino C. Lor; Eddie T. Ceralbo; Dindo D. Bacordo ^{‡}; Lislyn L. Indico ^{◌}; ‡ ex officio ABC president; ◌ ex officio SK chairman
  - Electorate: 20,020 voters (2025)

Area
  - Total: 170.50 km^{2} (65.83 sq mi)
- Elevation: 715 m (2,346 ft)
- Highest elevation: 1,535 m (5,036 ft)
- Lowest elevation: 260 m (850 ft)

Population (2024 census)
  - Total: 28,231
  - Density: 165.58/km^{2} (428.84/sq mi)
  - Households: 6,390

Economy
  - Income class: 3rd municipal income class
  - Poverty incidence: 41.71% (2023)
  - Revenue: ₱ 163 million (2024)
  - Assets: ₱ 567.7 million (2024)
  - Expenditure: ₱ 133.7 million (2024)
  - Liabilities: ₱ 302 million (2024)

Service provider
  - Electricity: Negros Electric and Power Corporation (NEPC)
- Time zone: UTC+8 (PST)
- ZIP code: 6117
- PSGC: 0604532000
- IDD : area code: +63 (0)34
- Native languages: Hiligaynon; Tagalog; Cebuano

Don Salvador Benedicto, officially the Municipality of Don Salvador Benedicto (Hiligaynon: Banwa sang Don Salvador Benedicto; Tagalog: Bayan ng Don Salvador Benedicto) or simply Salvador Benedicto and abbreviated as DSB, is a municipality in the province of Negros Occidental, Philippines. According to the 2024 census, it has a population of 28,231 people.

The municipality is a post-colonial provincial hill station, designated the Summer Capital of Negros Occidental, and is a popular tourist site.

== History ==
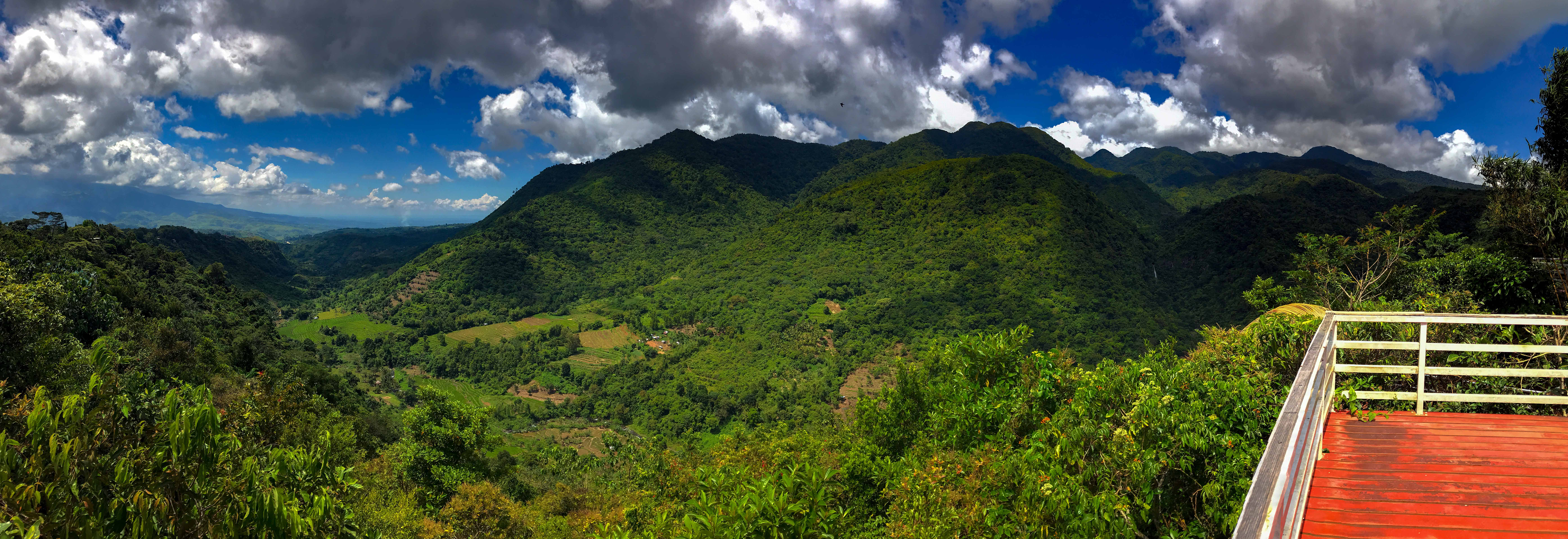
Mountain ranges seen at Don Salvador Benedicto

The concept of establishing the municipality was initiated by Nehemias 'Nene' de la Cruz, who, while imprisoned during the Martial law era, envisioned creating a town from what was considered a “cradle of insurgency.” and after his release, gained the support of his friend Mike Coronel, who was also the provincial commander of the Philippine Constabulary in Negros Occidental, in establishing the upcoming municipality based in Barangay Igmaya-an, which was then part of Murcia, in 1976. Located at the center of the mountains of northern Negros Occidental, Don Salvador Benedicto was chartered in 1983 through Batas Pambansa Bilang 336 by then President Ferdinand Marcos. It consolidated all the remote barangays of San Carlos City and the towns of Calatrava and Murcia. which were apparently neglected due to inaccessibility.

The town is named after the former Vice Governor Salvador Valois Benedicto (March 31, 1889–November 28, 1956) who played an important role in the setting up of a Revolutionary Government in Negros Island particularly in Barangay Igmaya-an, when the country was occupied by the Japanese during World War II. He was also the main guerrilla coordinator in both Negros Oriental and Negros Occidental during the said war. Salvador Benedicto is a relative of Roberto Benedicto, a crony of Marcos.

== Geography ==
Don Salvador Benedicto is 47 kilometres (29 mi) east of Bacolod, via Negros Occidental Eco-Tourism Highway (N69) and 53 kilometres (33 mi) from Calatrava.

=== Barangays ===
Don Salvador Benedicto is politically subdivided into 7 barangays. Each barangay consists of puroks and some have sitios.

- Bago (Lalung)
- Bagong Silang (Marcelo)
- Bunga
- Igmaya-an
- Kumaliskis
- Pandanon
- Pinowayan (Prosperidad)

=== Climate ===
Climate data for Don Salvador Benedicto, Negros Occidental
Month	Jan	Feb	Mar	Apr	May	Jun	Jul	Aug	Sep	Oct	Nov	Dec	Year
Mean daily maximum °C (°F)	23 (73)	24 (75)	26 (79)	27 (81)	27 (81)	26 (79)	25 (77)	25 (77)	25 (77)	25 (77)	24 (75)	24 (75)	25 (77)
Mean daily minimum °C (°F)	19 (66)	18 (64)	19 (66)	20 (68)	21 (70)	21 (70)	20 (68)	20 (68)	20 (68)	20 (68)	20 (68)	19 (66)	20 (68)
Average precipitation mm (inches)	120 (4.7)	87 (3.4)	95 (3.7)	97 (3.8)	187 (7.4)	263 (10.4)	251 (9.9)	220 (8.7)	227 (8.9)	268 (10.6)	220 (8.7)	158 (6.2)	2,193 (86.4)
Average rainy days	16.1	12.6	15.4	16.8	25.8	28.4	29.1	27.9	27.7	28.5	23.9	18.4	270.6
Source: Meteoblue

== Demographics ==
Population census of Don Salvador Benedicto
Year	Pop.	±% p.a.
1990	13,538	—
1995	17,635	+5.08%
2000	17,259	−0.46%
2007	22,979	+4.03%
2010	23,624	+1.01%
2015	25,662	+1.59%
2020	26,922	+1.01%
2024	28,231	+1.15%
Source: Philippine Statistics Authority

=== Languages ===
Major languages are Hiligaynon, followed by Cebuano. English and Tagalog are also understood.

== Economy ==
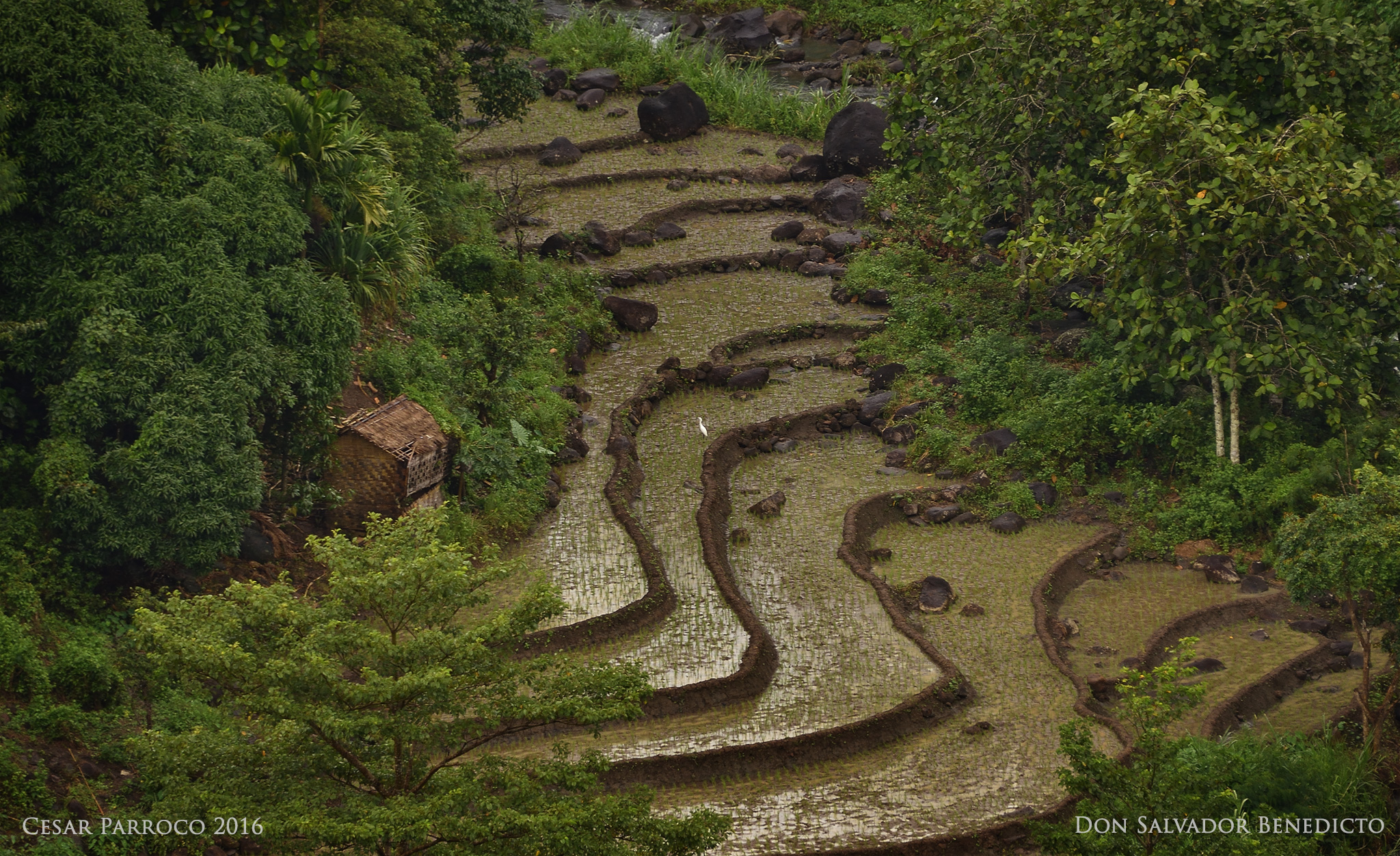

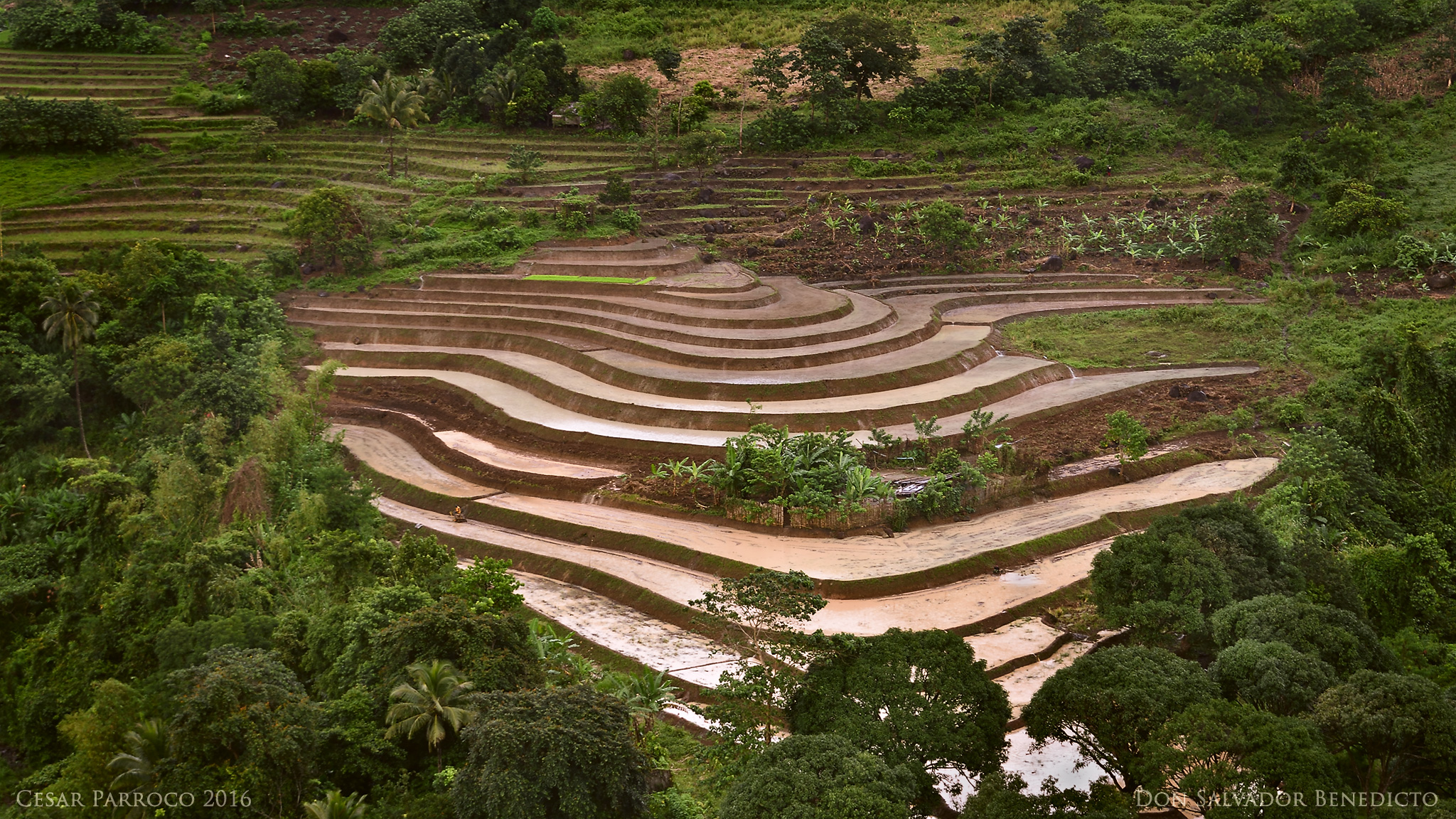
A small nipa hut amidst the rice fields of Don Salvador Benedicto.

Poverty incidence of Don Salvador Benedicto (%)

Source: Philippine Statistics Authority

Although a small town, the town of Don Salvador Benedicto has seen a rise in its municipal economy thanks to tourism and local agriculture. Due to its high altitude like Baguio, the town can support crops that grow in temperate areas, making it ideal for a multitude of farming businesses. Tourism is on the rise for the town especially when travellers head out into the heart of the province. Also located in the municipality are the Choco Hills, similar to Bohol's Chocolate Hills, with shared boundary of Barangay Prosperidad, San Carlos City.

== See also ==
Alternate rendering of seal, showing 8 teeth

- Mambukal, a township hill station in Negros Occidental.
- Baguio, first hill station and Summer Capital of the Philippines.
