= Negros Occidental Eco-Tourism Highway =

Scenic highway in Negros Occidental, Philippines

Negros Occidental Eco-Tourism Highway
- Bacolod–San Carlos Road; Bacolod–Murcia–Don Salvador Benedicto–San Carlos Road
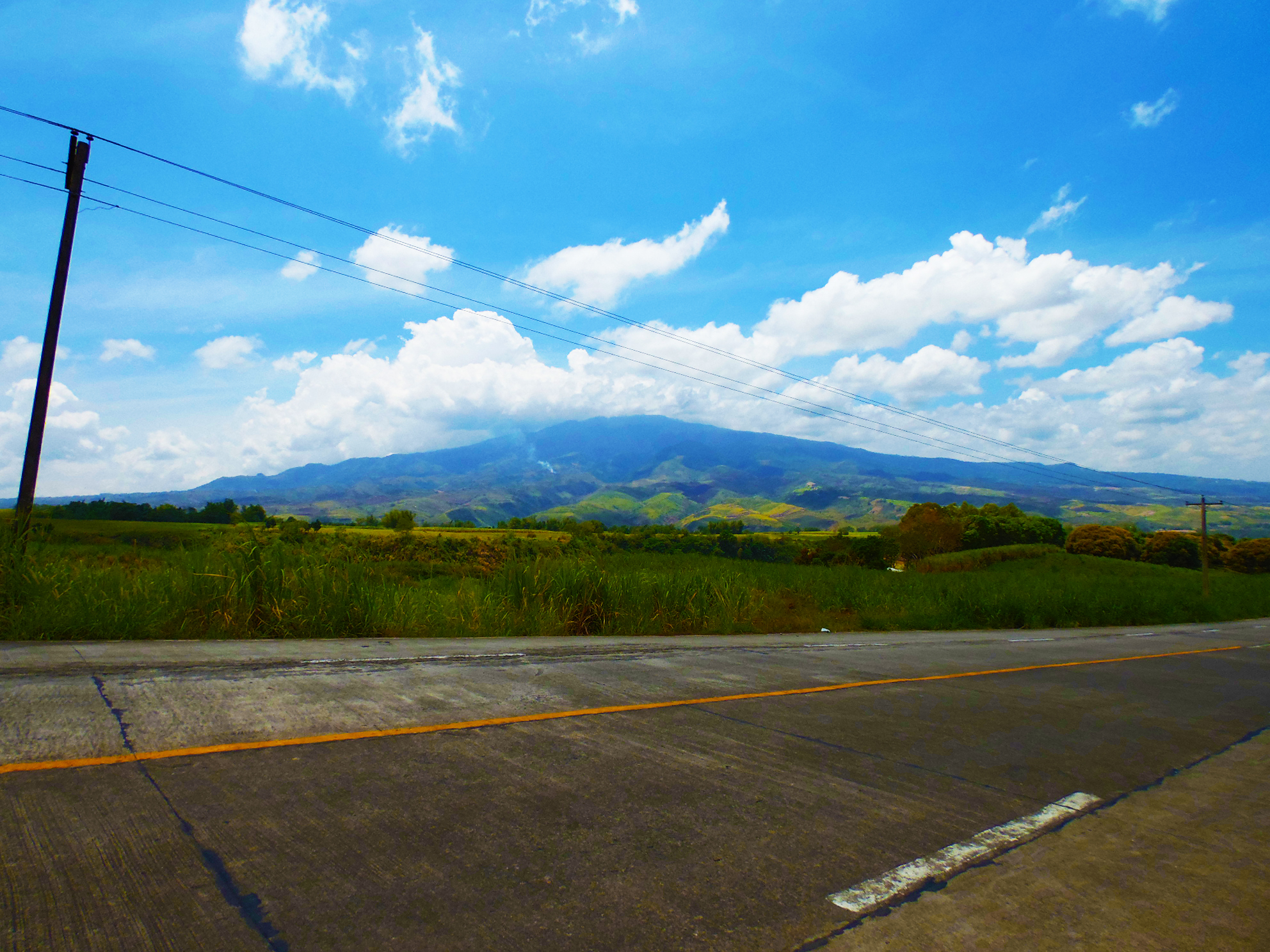
- Bacolod–Murcia–Don Salvador Benedicto–San Carlos Road in Murcia

Route information
- Maintained by the Department of Public Works and Highways
- Length: 81.12 km (50.41 mi)
- Component highways: N69

Major junctions
- East end: N6 / N7 (Bacolod South Road)
- N701 (Bacolod Circumferential Road) in Bacolod; N708 (Jct. DS Benedicto–Spur 16–Calatrava Road) in Don Salvador Benedicto
- West end: N7 (Bacolod North Road)

Location
- Country: Philippines
- Provinces: Negros Occidental
- Major cities: Bacolod, San Carlos
- Towns: Don Salvador Benedicto, Murcia

Highway system
- Roads in the Philippines; Highways; Expressways; List
← N68	→ N70

The Negros Occidental Eco-Tourism Highway, officially known as the Bacolod–San Carlos Road and Bacolod–Murcia–Don Salvador Benedicto–San Carlos Road, is an 81.12-kilometer (50.41 mi) highway connecting the city of Bacolod to the city of San Carlos in Negros Occidental, Philippines. The route crosses north-central Negros Island from the western coastal plain through the central mountain range, traversing the Northern Negros Natural Park north of Mount Kanlaon before descending to the Tañon Strait coast. From Bacolod the road passes through lowland sugarcane agricultural land before climbing through Murcia into the upland interior, where fog regularly reduces visibility in wet weather and mornings. The highway passes through Don Salvador Benedicto before reaching San Carlos, where ferry connections link to Cebu. Its western segment in Bacolod, also known as Alijis Road (Romeo G. Guanzon Avenue), includes a two-way bicycle lane.

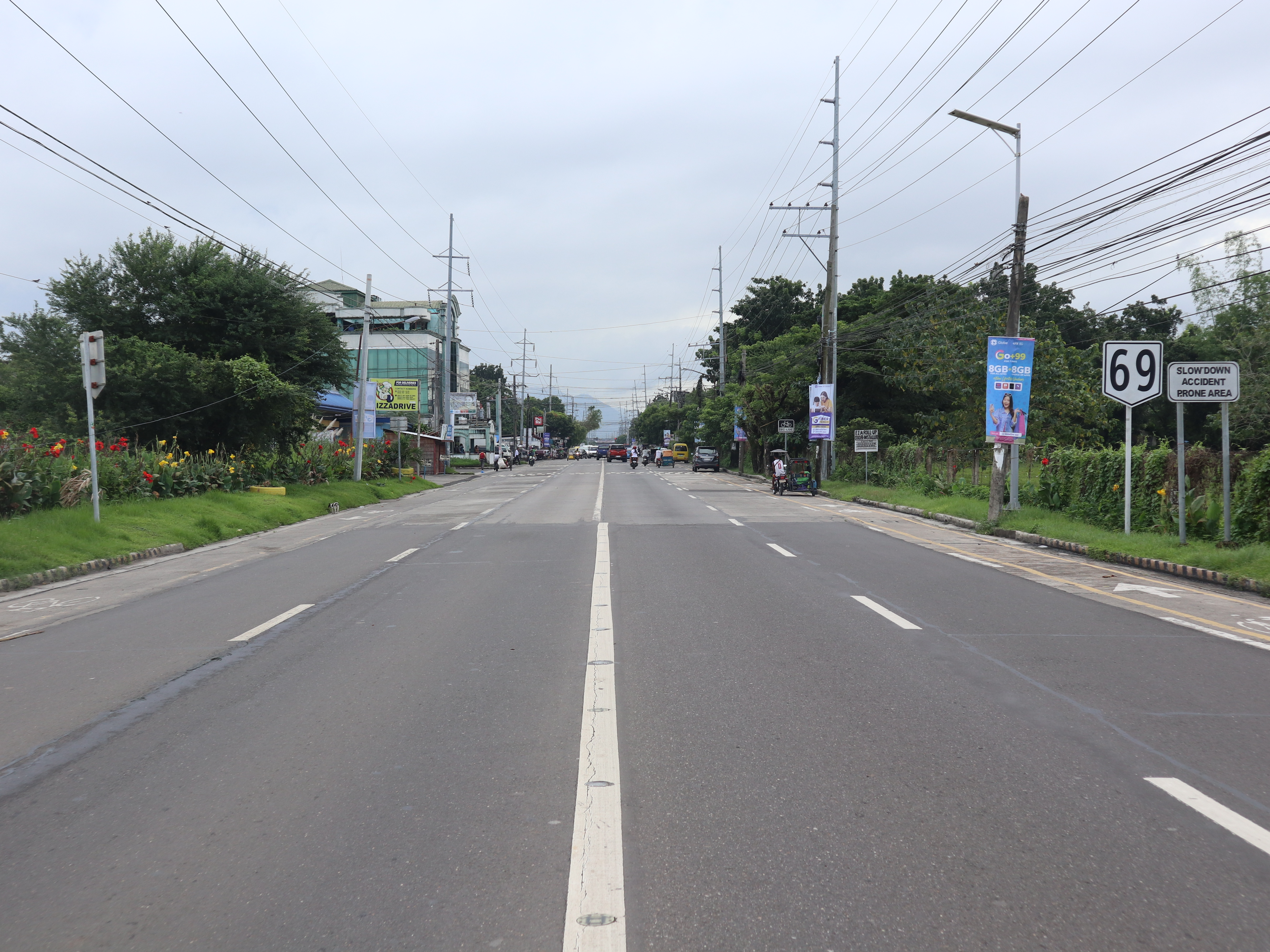
Alijis Road in Bacolod with the N69 reassurance marker and bicycle lanes

The entire highway is designated as National Route 69 (N69) of the Philippine highway network.

== Route description ==
=== Bacolod ===
The road starts in an intersection with the Bacolod South Road beside the old Bacolod Domestic Airport. The road has a 9.6 kilometres (6.0 miles) stretch in Bacolod which is named the Bacolod-San Carlos segment. Shortly after the highway starts, the road intersects with the Bacolod Circumferential Road. The highway trails southeast before intersecting with the Bacolod Economic Highway, ending shortly after.

=== Negros Occidental ===
The road enters Murcia, Negros Occidental at the Department of Public Works and Highways 3rd district in the province with a 21.7 km (13.5 mi) stretch. The road tracks more southeast, intersecting with the Murcia-Cansilayan-Damsite-Abuanan-Bago City Road. The road then trails east, before going north.

== History ==
The highway originated from an old road connecting Bacolod to the foot of Mount Kanlaon in Murcia that is also historically part of Highway 336. It was later extended to San Carlos sometime after World War II.

== Intersections ==
The entire route is located in Negros Occidental. Intersections are numbered by kilometer post, with Negros Occidental Provincial Capitol in Bacolod designated as kilometer zero.

City/Municipality	km	mi	Destinations	Notes
Bacolod	4	2.5	N6 / N7 (Bacolod South Road) / Araneta Street	Western terminus
Bacolod	6	3.7	N701 (Bacolod Circumferential Road)	
Don Salvador Benedicto	53	33	N708 (Jct. DS Benedicto–Spur 16–Calatrava Road)	
San Carlos	87	54	N7 (Bacolod North Road)	Eastern terminus
1.000 mi = 1.609 km; 1.000 km = 0.621 mi

== See also ==
- Northern Negros Natural Park
- Mount Kanlaon
- Don Salvador Benedicto
- Negros Island Region
