= Bais, Negros Oriental =

Component city in Negros Oriental, Philippines

Bais
- Component city
- City of Bais
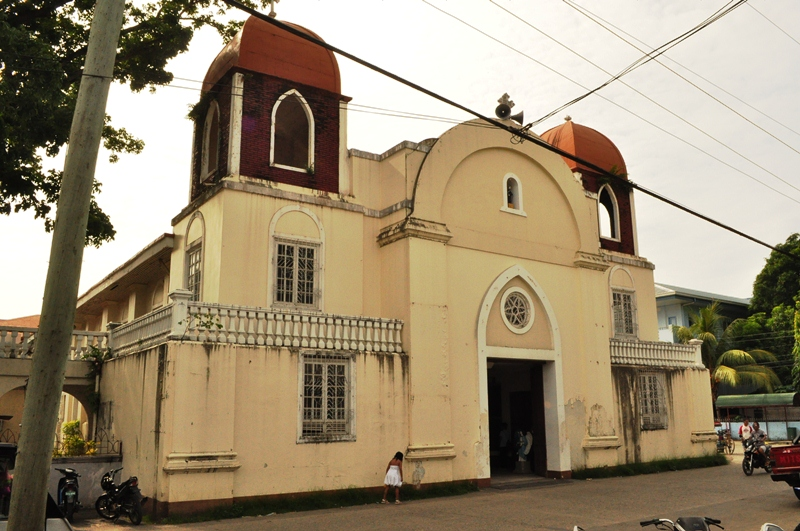
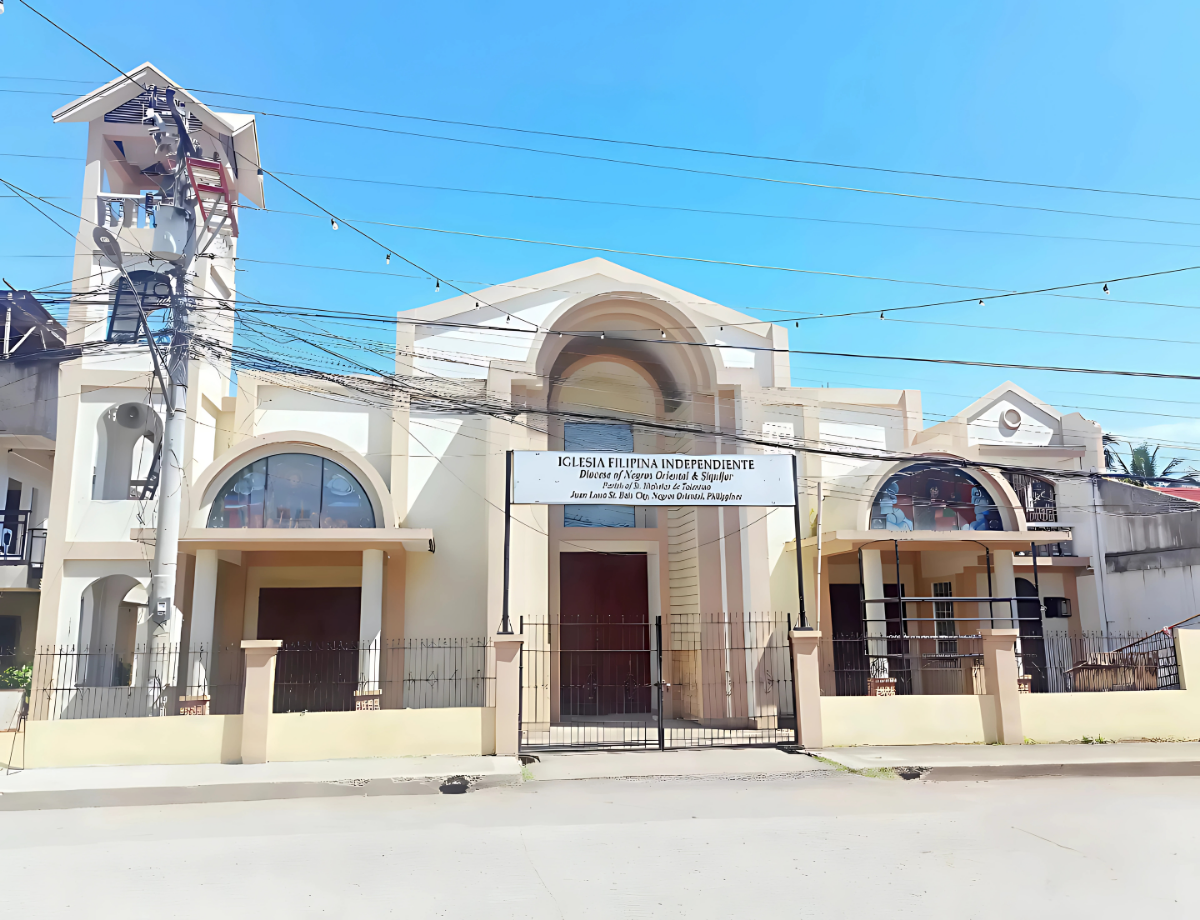
- San Nicolas de Tolentino Roman Catholic Parish Church of Bais (top), Iglesia Filipina Independiente Parish Church of St. Nicholas de Tolentino, Bais (bottom)

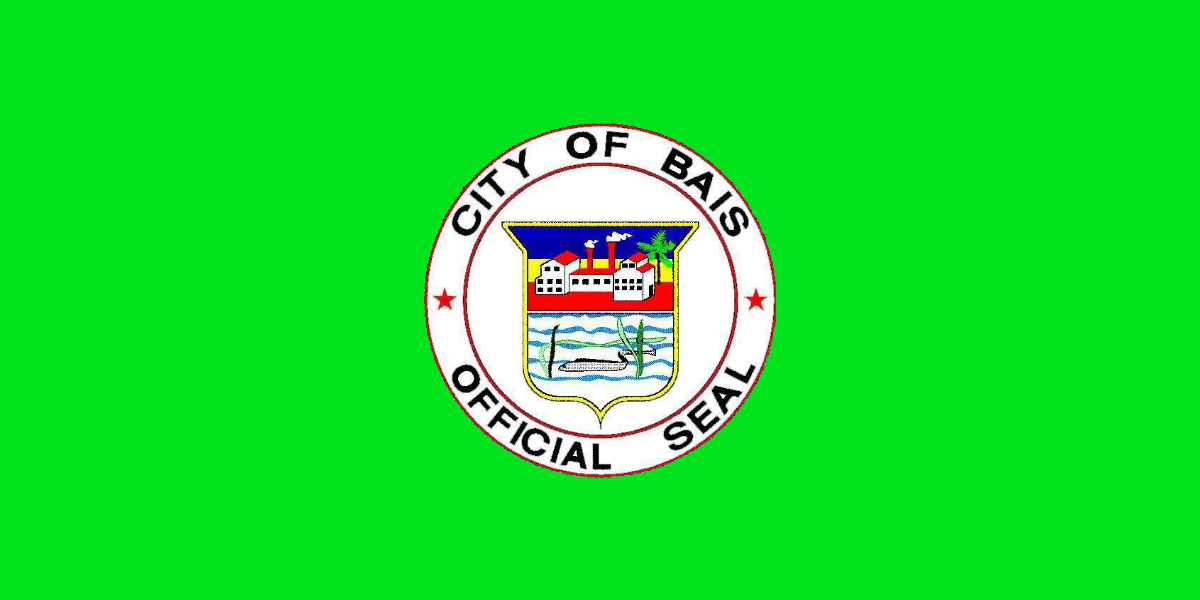
- Flag Seal
- Nicknames: The City of Dolphin and the Whale Watching Tours
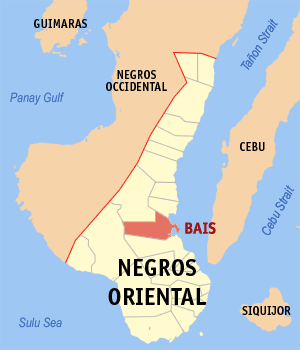
- Map of Negros Oriental with Bais highlighted
- Interactive map of Bais
- Location within the Philippines
- Coordinates: 9°35′26″N 123°07′17″E
- Country: Philippines
- Region: Negros Island Region
- Province: Negros Oriental
- District: 2nd district
- Cityhood: September 7, 1968
- Barangays: 35 (see Barangays)

Government
  - Type: Sangguniang Panlungsod
  - Mayor: Luigi Marcel T. Goñi
  - Vice Mayor: Mercedes T. Goñi (NPC)
  - Representative: Maisa Sagarbarria (Lakas)
  - City Council: Members: Bruno "Thirdy" G. Bouffard; Bimbong O. Megio; Catherine D. Goñi; Emilio Manuel S. Yoldi; Joemarie T. Badoy; Arsenio C. Adana, Sr.; Crisline M. Repollo; Kyla D. Jimenez; Ingrid S. Villanueva; Anthony John V. De Guia; Teofe Zamora ^{‡}; Danika Kaye J. Ferraren ^{◌}; ‡ ex officio ABC president; ◌ ex officio SK chairman
  - Electorate: 62,996 voters (2025)

Area
  - Total: 319.64 km^{2} (123.41 sq mi)
- Elevation: 179 m (587 ft)
- Highest elevation: 926 m (3,038 ft)
- Lowest elevation: 0 m (0 ft)

Population (2024 census)
  - Total: 88,050
  - Density: 275.5/km^{2} (713.5/sq mi)
  - Households: 20,047

Economy
  - Income class: 3rd city income class
  - Poverty incidence: 36.53% (2023)
  - Revenue: ₱ 1,053 million (2024)
  - Assets: ₱ 555.4 million (2024)
  - Expenditure: ₱ 362.3 million (2024)
  - Liabilities: ₱ 1,346 million (2024)

Service provider
  - Electricity: Negros Oriental 1 Electric Cooperative (NORECO 1)
- Time zone: UTC+8 (PST)
- ZIP code: 6206
- PSGC: 074604000
- IDD : area code: +63 (0)35
- Native languages: Cebuano; Ata; Tagalog

Bais, officially the City of Bais (Cebuano: Dakbayan sa Bais; Filipino: Lungsod ng Bais), is a component city in the province of Negros Oriental, Philippines. According to the 2024 census, it has a population of 88,050 people.

== Etymology ==
In the early days of Spanish exploration, some Spaniards came upon a swampy land and docked their boats at the vicinity of the two small islets that guarded the village. While exploring the place, they saw natives fishing along the coast. The Spaniards approached the natives and asked for the name of the place. The natives could not understand Spanish, and believing that the Spaniards were asking for the name of their catch, the natives answered saying "Ba-is"; from that day on, this swampy valley of the Old Panlabangan and Talamban Hills became known as Bais.

Another explanation of the origin of the name Bais is that it was derived from the Visayan word "ba-is" for brackish-water eel – a fish species native to the city and one which has become the city's delicacy.

== History ==
Pioneer in the sugar industry

Negros Oriental's economy was far from progressive, and its rich soil was not utilized to its full capacity in the 1850s. During those years, people in Negros Island are depicted as having a life of content for they tended to produce only enough goods to meet their daily needs. Even before the sugar boom of the 1850s, Negros was already producing cash crops. The transport of most of its product was mainly done from the ports of Iloilo, which explains the fast moving pace of development of the sugar industry in Negros Occidental, primarily due to its proximity to Iloilo. This situation was a disadvantage on the movement of sugar from the oriental plantations further away to the east.

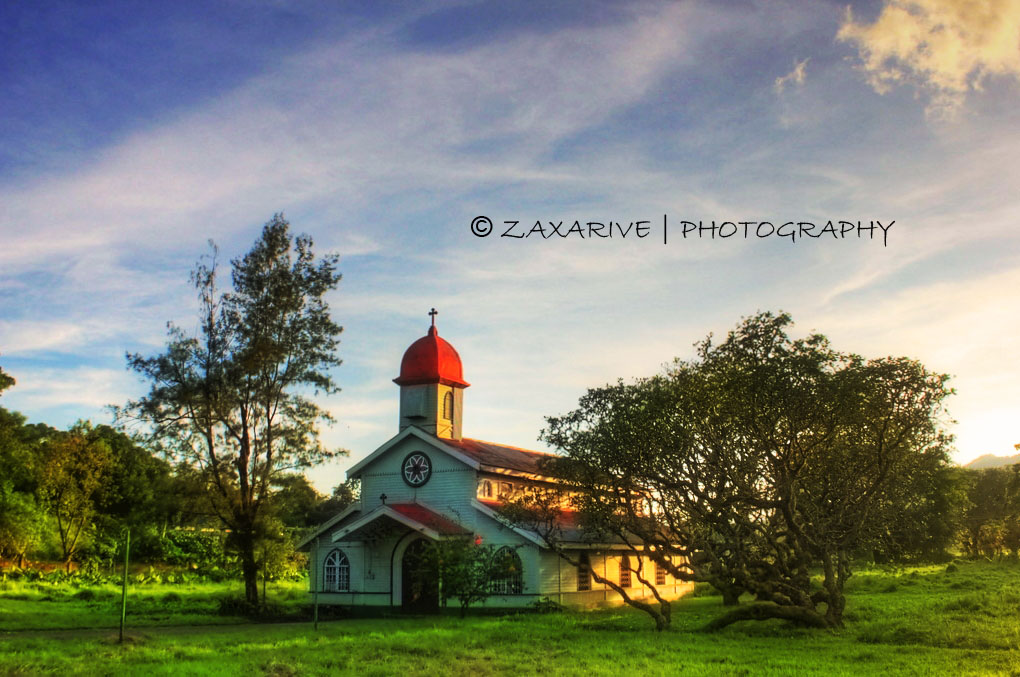
The Mojon Chapel, built in 1918

The pioneer agricultores and adventurers include Rodrigo Rubio y Pérez, Diego Baena y García-Gil, and José Romero Moreno, from Cádiz, Agustín de Sandes of Mexico City, Juan José de Altónaga of Erandio, Hermenegildo Villanueva Dee y Regis, a chino cristiano from Parián, Cebu. Many more agricultural titans of the time came and went until the decline of the industry in the 80s and 90s when the town was beset by low international commodity prices.

A wide array of difficulties barred the development of the sugar industry in the Oriental part of the island. After hearing about the fertility of the flatland of Bais, these aforementioned individuals carved away the virgin forests of the eastern side of the island. Many came and settled in the area and planted fragrant rice, native coffee, and sugar cane. The small-scale production of muscovado sugar is attributed to Dumaguete chino cristiano rice merchant Vicente Anunciación Teves Tan Ing-Lai from their mills which was then exported to Spain via Iloilo, the principal shipping point in the Visayas. This was loaded in large sailboats called lorchas or batél built by Aniceto Villanueva Dee and marketed Joaquín Montenegro Mascato since the ships of YCO have not plied the Tañón Strait yet.

Bais credits much of its progress to the Central Azucarera de Báis y Tanjay, the largest producer of raw sugar in Negros Oriental. It was established by the Compañía-General de Tabacos de Filipinas, S.A. of Spain around 1917 ( Baisanon Historian Prof. Penn T. Larena )

The sugarcane industry reached its peak in the 1930s, and again in the 1950s and 1960s, bringing affluence to the Negrenses and enabling them to build stately fincas and to acquire properties all over the province, and even as far as Makati's posh neighbourhoods, rivalling that of the Iloilo sugar barons.

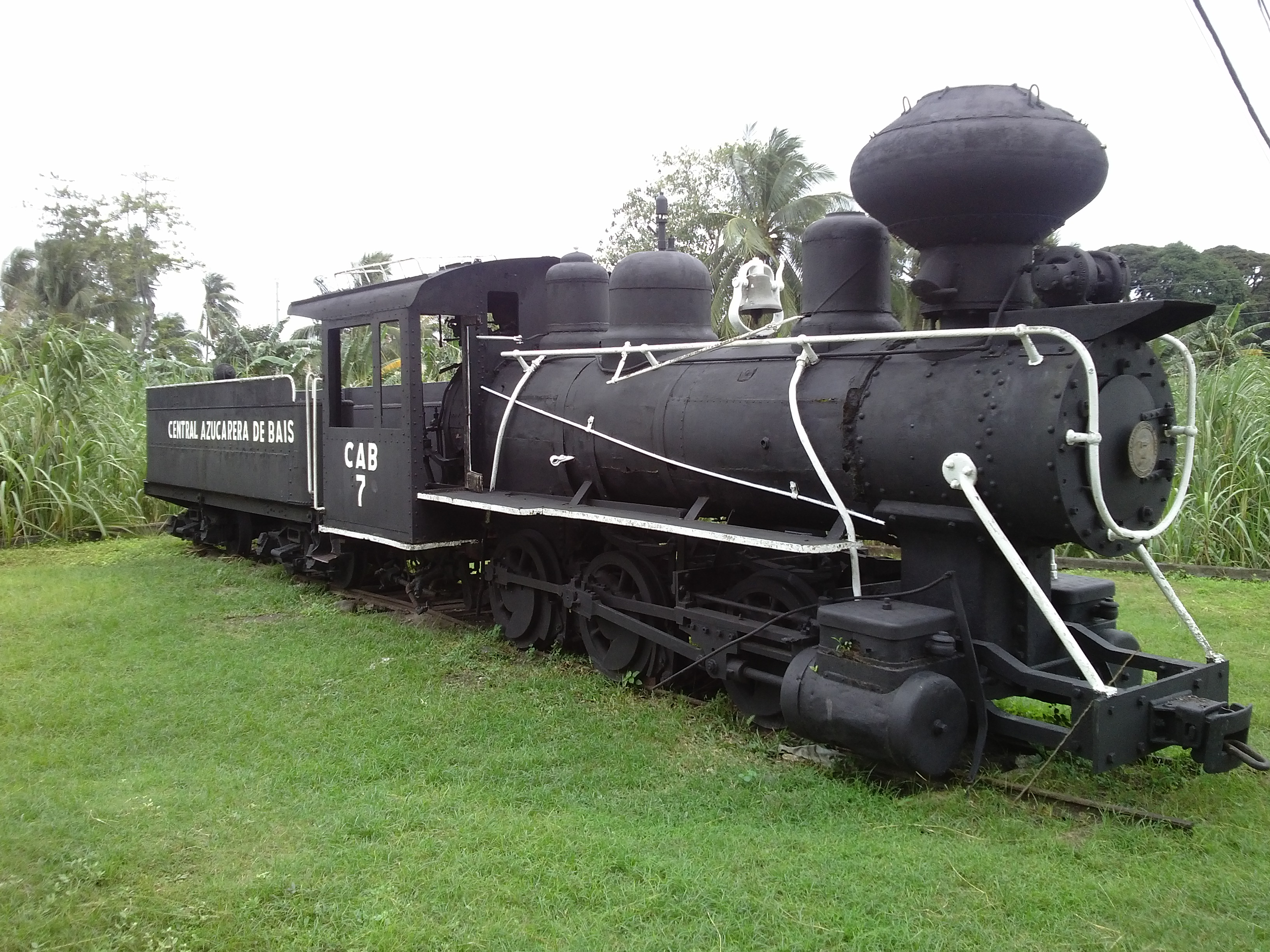
An old locomotive of the Central Azucarera de Bais

The Central Azucarera de Báis itself is an old foreboding structure of metal and hard wood. The offices may have seen better days, the dank smell of nostalgia hang heavy in the air, but are still functional. Nearby is the Casa Grande, an equally old residential compound surrounded by tall acacia trees, which was built for the use of the employees of the Azucarera. The two-storey wooden houses are greatly influenced by old Spanish design and architecture. Much of the houses have undergone restoration and continue to be used as homes of the representatives of the executives of the new management.

In 1959, President Carlos P. Garcia signed Republic Act No. 2469, where fourteen of the municipality's sitios seceded to form the municipality of Mabinay. Trinidad seceded before the war to form its own municipality. Bais officially became a city on the 9th of September, 1968 (R.A. No. 5444). Currently, there have been calls for the charter to be amended to bring back the seceded cities back into the fold since the population has exploded. The latest development is attributed to the Cebuana Lhuillier Group which owns half of the prime real estate, and a third of the whole city.

== Geography ==
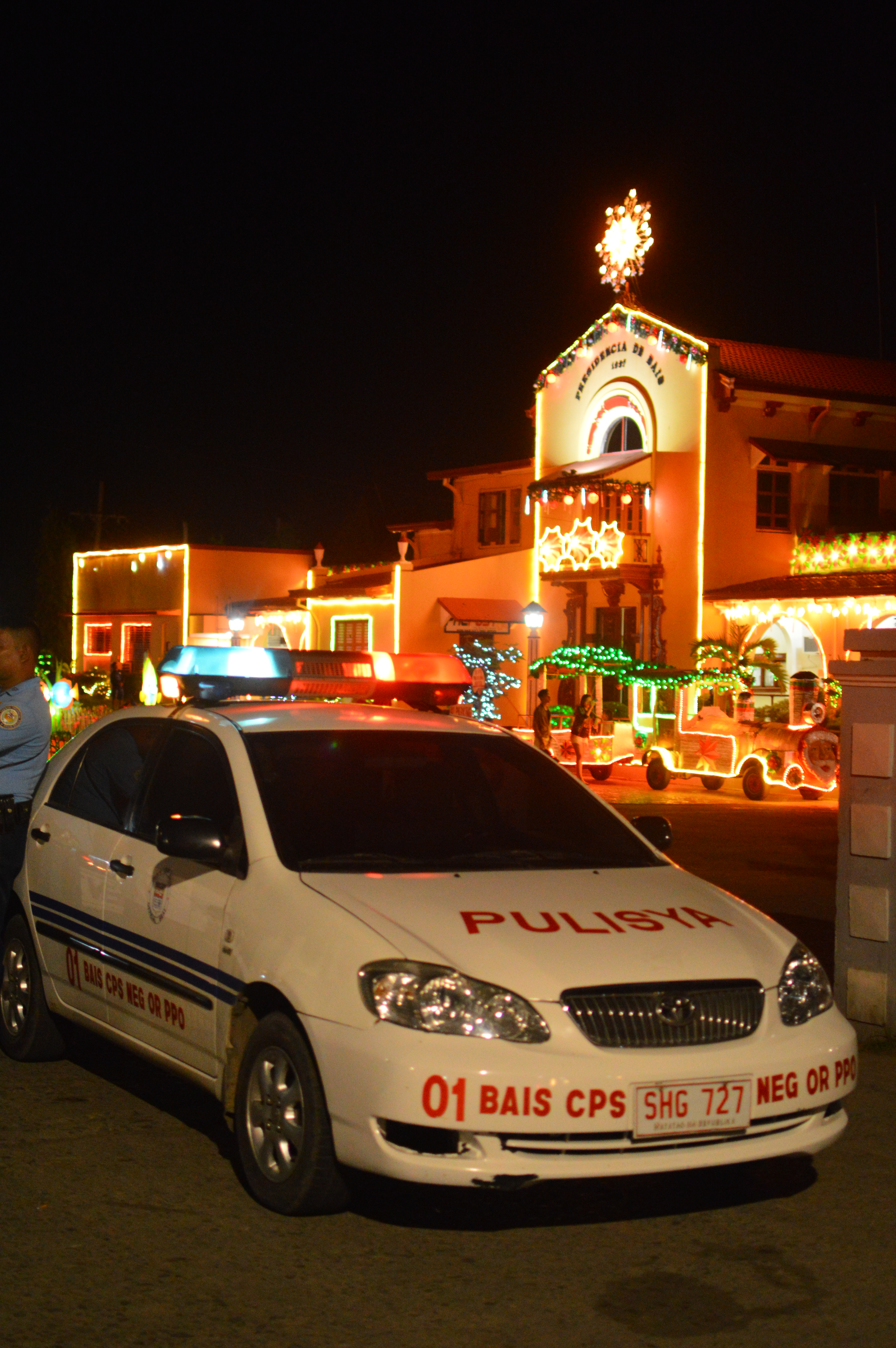
Bais City Hall (Presidencia de Bais) grounds

Located 45 kilometres (28 mi) from the provincial capital Dumaguete and 170 kilometres (110 mi) from Bacolod, it has a land area of 31,964 hectares (78,980 acres). There are two bays in the area, hence the name "Bais." The shore line is mostly mangroves, which are in danger of destruction due to the increasing population. The richness of marine life in the bays is because of these mangroves.

The city is characterized by widespread lowlands that are ideal for sugar planting because of the city's naturally fertile soil. At least 73% of the city's total land area is devoted primarily to agriculture, primarily to creating sugar plantations.

The territorial jurisdiction of Bais includes two islets (Olympia and Dewey) and the Bais Bay. The Bais Bay area holds a diversity of animal life and is a rich breeding and fishing ground for demersal and other fish species, and also invertebrates. North Bais Bay is also famous for dolphin watching.

The Pelarta River runs beside the city center. The river has been the source of irrigation water for the nearby sugar farms, making it vital in the success of sugar plantations in this area. This river also has a big influence on the city's geography, as it deposits sediments in the former mangrove areas during the (formerly annual) flood season. These former mangrove swamps have now dried out and become populated with residents. In the late 1970s, under the Genaro Goñi administration, a river control system stretching from the city center toward the low-lying areas was established in order to lessen flooding during the rainy season.

Further south are the stately plantation houses owned by sugar planters, mostly standing on one of the lots in the family hacienda. Inside the haciendas are chapels whose altar and icons date back to 1917. Educational visits to these places may be arranged at the Bais City Tourism Office. Visitors get to tour via the old railroad trams used by the milling companies to hasten sugar cane transport.

=== Barangays ===
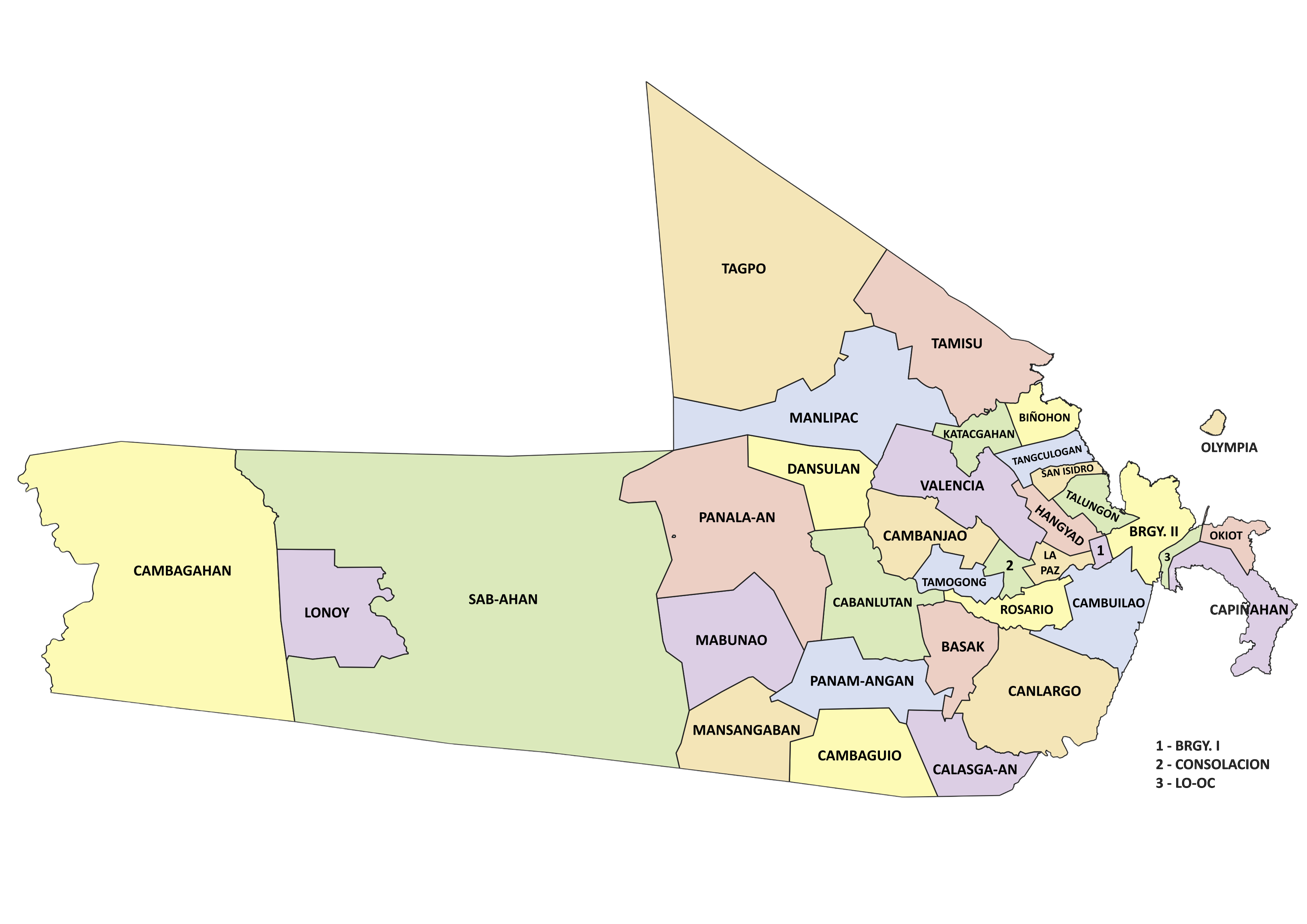
Political map of Bais

Bais is politically subdivided into 35 barangays. Each barangay consists of puroks and some have sitios.

PSGC	Barangay	Population			±% p.a.	
		2024		2010		
074604001	Barangay I (Pob.)	4.0%	3,478	3,868	▾	−0.74%
074604002	Barangay II (Pob.)	10.8%	9,483	9,904	▾	−0.30%
074604003	Basak	2.5%	2,175	1,610	▴	2.11%
074604004	Biñohon	1.5%	1,347	1,506	▾	−0.77%
074604005	Cabanlutan	2.7%	2,417	1,996	▴	1.34%
074604006	Calasga-an	2.8%	2,484	2,556	▾	−0.20%
074604007	Cambagahan	8.2%	7,234	4,990	▴	2.62%
074604008	Cambaguio	1.6%	1,371	1,244	▴	0.68%
074604009	Cambanjao	1.8%	1,597	1,504	▴	0.42%
074604010	Cambuilao	2.1%	1,816	1,633	▴	0.74%
074604011	Canlargo	2.5%	2,179	1,636	▴	2.01%
074604012	Capiñahan	2.1%	1,822	1,682	▴	0.56%
074604013	Consolacion	0.7%	638	586	▴	0.59%
074604014	Dansulan	1.2%	1,076	1,220	▾	−0.87%
074604015	Hangyad	0.3%	238	206	▴	1.01%
074604030	Katacgahan	1.5%	1,350	1,029	▴	1.91%
074604017	La Paz	1.3%	1,169	962	▴	1.36%
074604018	Lo-oc	2.9%	2,543	2,226	▴	0.93%
074604019	Lonoy	3.5%	3,088	2,855	▴	0.55%
074604020	Mabunao	1.7%	1,488	1,413	▴	0.36%
074604021	Manlipac	3.7%	3,228	2,598	▴	1.52%
074604022	Mansangaban	1.5%	1,296	1,368	▾	−0.38%
074604023	Okiot	4.3%	3,822	3,536	▴	0.54%
074604024	Olympia	1.1%	980	866	▴	0.86%
074604025	Panala-an	4.6%	4,065	3,790	▴	0.49%
074604026	Panam-angan	1.2%	1,015	1,244	▾	−1.40%
074604027	Rosario	0.7%	576	273	▴	5.33%
074604028	Sab-ahan	8.0%	7,046	6,241	▴	0.85%
074604029	San Isidro	0.4%	389	340	▴	0.94%
074604031	Tagpo	3.1%	2,709	2,488	▴	0.59%
074604032	Talungon	4.2%	3,714	2,083	▴	4.10%
074604033	Tamisu	4.3%	3,827	2,884	▴	1.99%
074604034	Tamogong	0.7%	583	418	▴	2.34%
074604035	Tangculogan	1.5%	1,278	1,100	▴	1.05%
074604036	Valencia	0.9%	796	867	▾	−0.59%
	Total		88,050	74,722	▴	1.15%

=== Climate ===
Climate data for Bais, Negros Oriental
Month	Jan	Feb	Mar	Apr	May	Jun	Jul	Aug	Sep	Oct	Nov	Dec	Year
Mean daily maximum °C (°F)	29 (84)	29 (84)	30 (86)	32 (90)	31 (88)	30 (86)	30 (86)	30 (86)	30 (86)	30 (86)	29 (84)	29 (84)	30 (86)
Mean daily minimum °C (°F)	23 (73)	23 (73)	23 (73)	24 (75)	25 (77)	25 (77)	24 (75)	24 (75)	24 (75)	24 (75)	24 (75)	23 (73)	24 (75)
Average precipitation mm (inches)	35 (1.4)	28 (1.1)	38 (1.5)	51 (2.0)	125 (4.9)	195 (7.7)	194 (7.6)	173 (6.8)	180 (7.1)	192 (7.6)	121 (4.8)	64 (2.5)	1,396 (55)
Average rainy days	9.2	8.2	9.9	11.3	22.5	27.3	28.0	27.2	27.1	26.9	19.7	12.7	230
Source: Meteoblue (Use with caution: this is modeled/calculated data, not measured locally.)

== Demographics ==
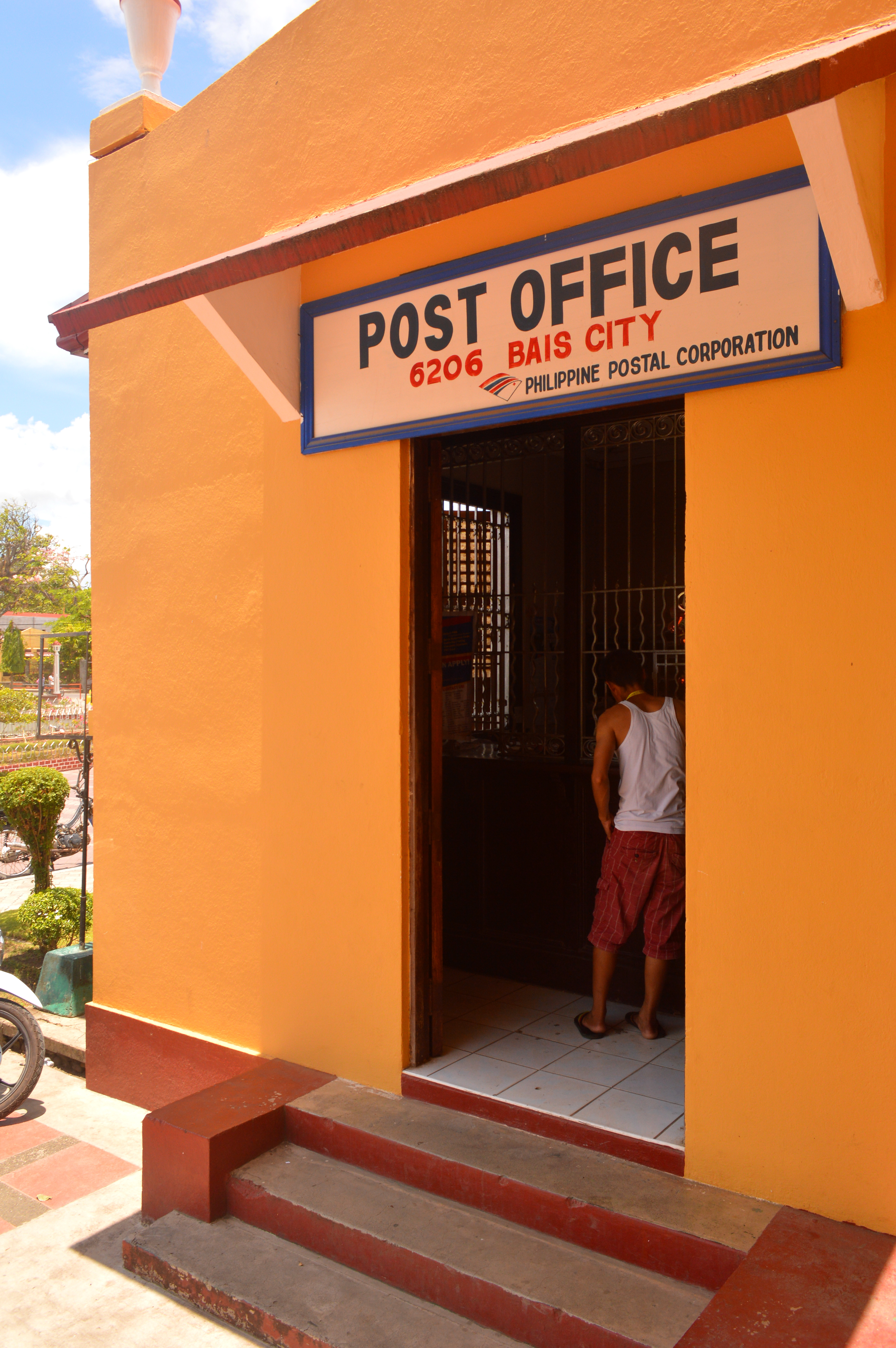
Bais City Postal Office

Population census of Bais
Year	Pop.	±% p.a.
1903	8,016	—
1918	13,952	+3.76%
1939	22,471	+2.30%
1948	17,869	−2.51%
1960	33,653	+5.42%
1970	40,095	+1.76%
1975	45,672	+2.65%
1980	49,301	+1.54%
1990	59,591	+1.91%
1995	63,355	+1.15%
2000	68,115	+1.57%
2007	74,702	+1.28%
2010	74,722	+0.01%
2015	76,291	+0.40%
2020	84,317	+2.13%
2024	88,050	+1.05%
Source: Philippine Statistics Authority

== Economy ==
Poverty incidence of Bais (%)

Source: Philippine Statistics Authority

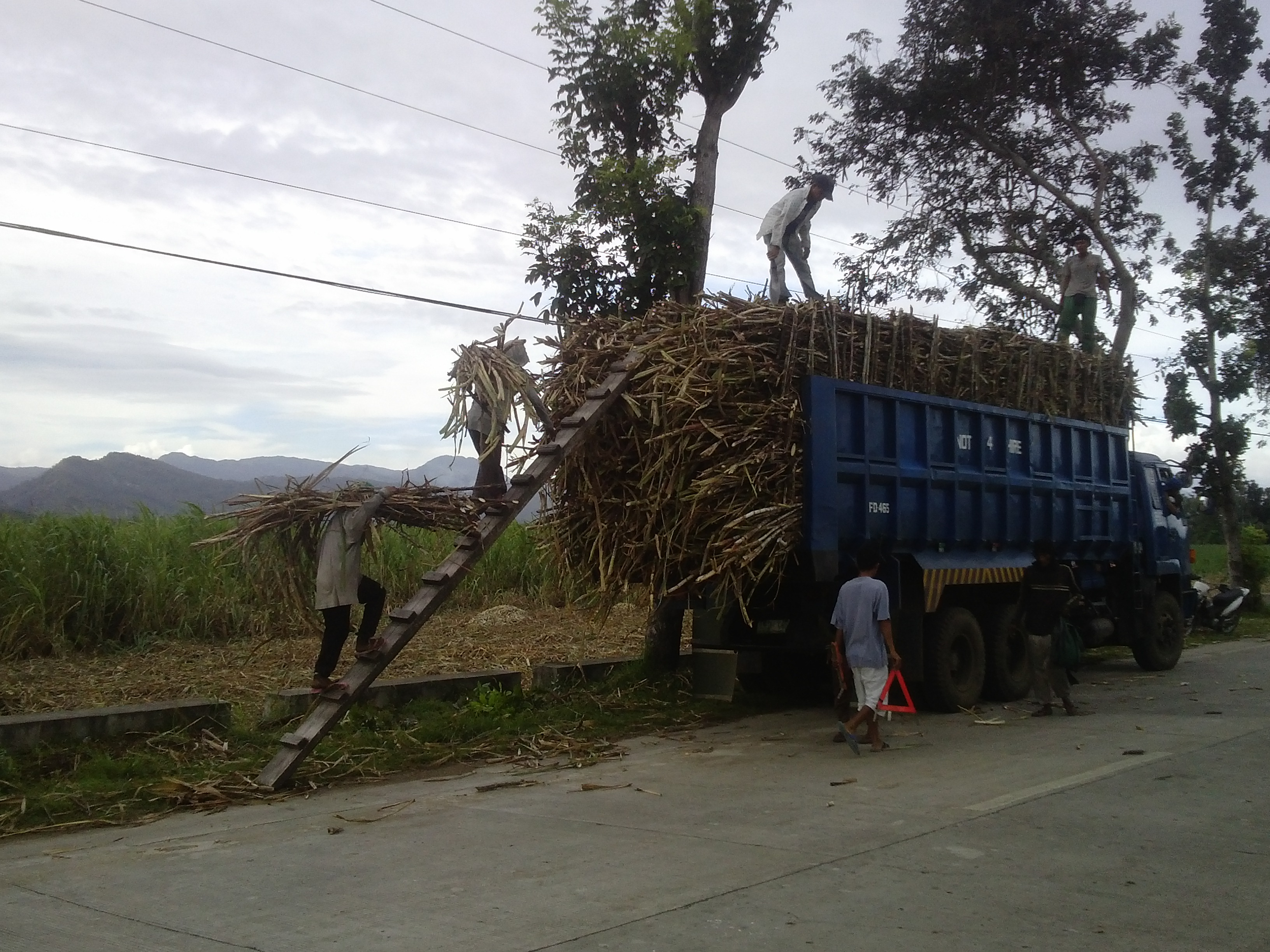
Loading sugar cane onto a truck parked on the National Highway that runs through the city

Sugar is the major commercial crop in the city. Bais is the largest producer of raw sugar in Negros Oriental. There are two sugar mills in the city. The Central Azucarera de Bais was established by Tabacalera of Spain in the early 1918 and is the oldest in the country. The other mill is URSUMCO (Universal Robina Sugar Milling Corporation) which was formerly known as UPSUMCO (United Planters Milling Corporation) and constructed in the mid-1970s by Marubeni Corporation of Japan as a project of Ignacio Longa Vicente (also of Spanish roots). An ethanol plant of the Universal Robina Corporation (URC) that produces bioethanol for the local market was inaugurated.

The local economy is dominated by agricultural activities and output. Seventy-three percent of the city's total land area is devoted to agriculture. The existing urban area in the city covers only 109.12 hectares. About 36% of the city's agricultural land is planted in sugarcane, yielding 1.16 million gross kilograms annually for the domestic and foreign markets.

Fish production is the city's second income earner, with about 428 hectares of the land area devoted to fishpond development and operation and fish culture. Bangus (milkfish) culture is the dominant activity. In 2000, the bangus yield in the city was at 722 tons.

== Culture ==
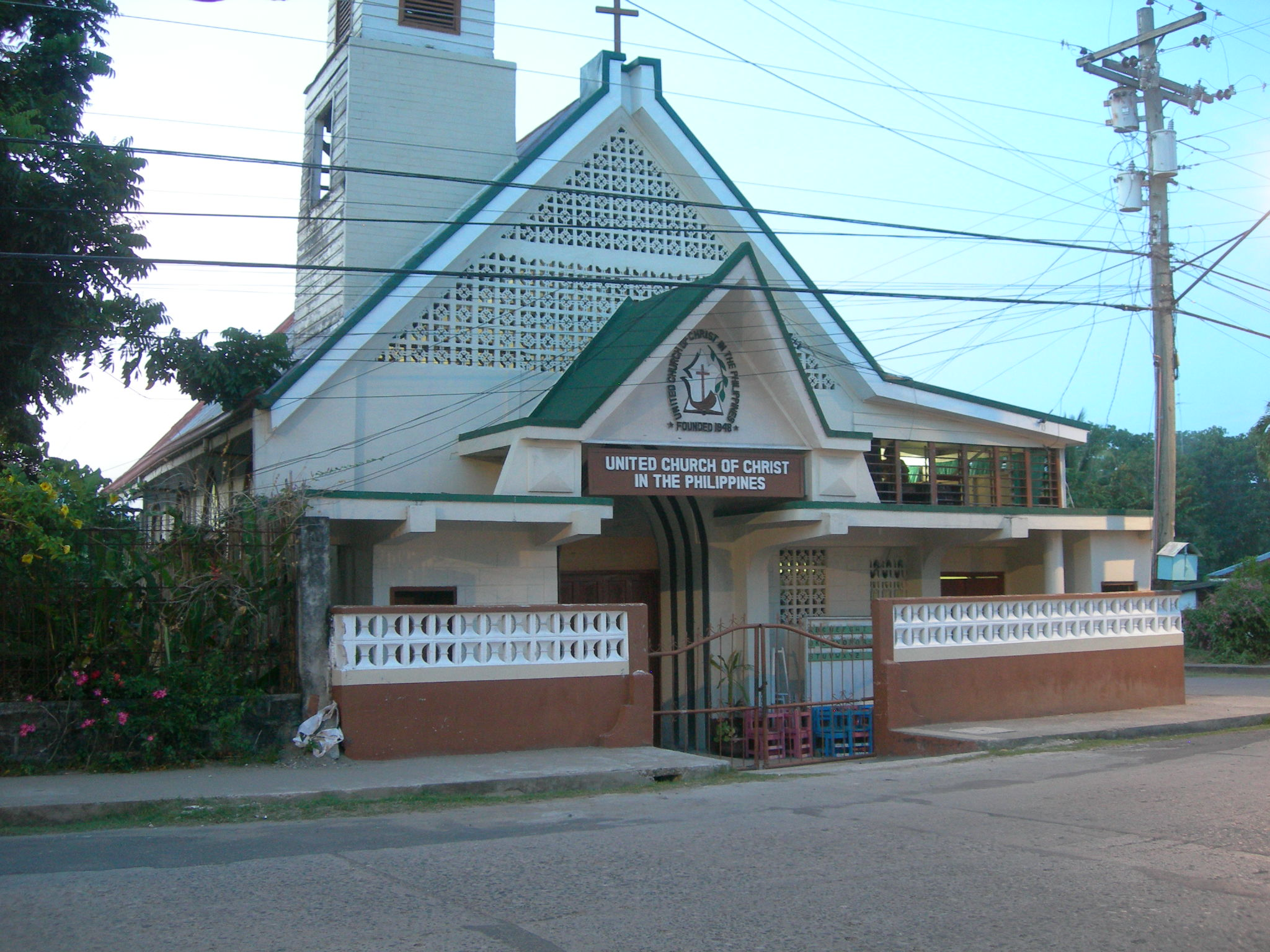
United Church of Christ in the Philippines (UCCP) in Bais City

An annual fiesta is held each year on September 10 in honor of the city's patron saint San Nicolás de Tolentino, a celebration inherited from the Spanish era. On this occasion, most of the residents prepare food for anyone who visits - a tradition practiced not only in Bais but also in most towns and cities in the Philippines. Lately, the celebration has included mardigras and parades.

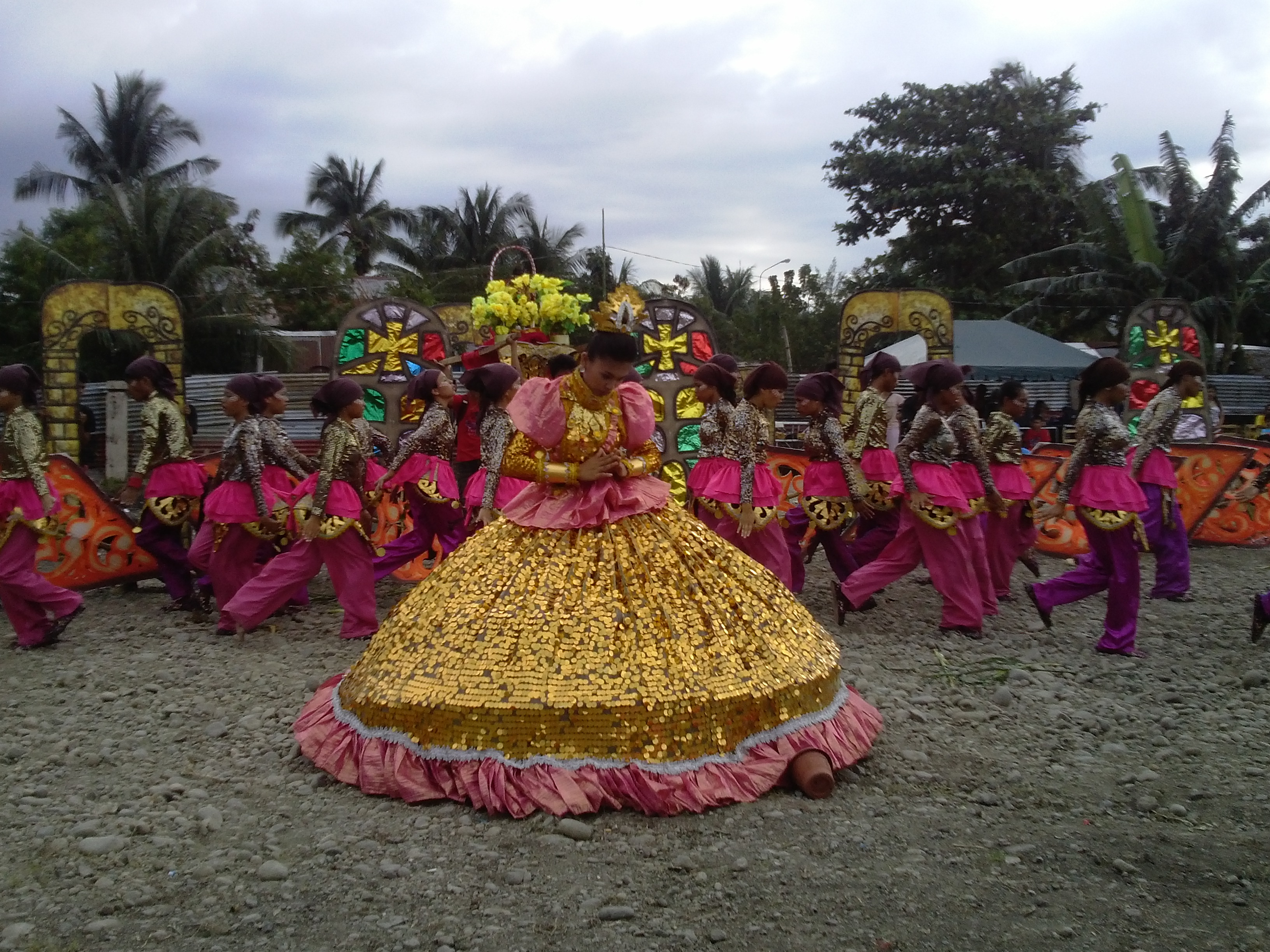
Dancer contestants in the city's Sipong Festival (Hudyaka sa Bais)

The government of Bais operates ecotourism activities in the city, highlighted by whale and dolphin watching and nature treks. Two annual Bais festivals have also become tourism events: the Hudyaka sa Bais Mardigras (which was changed to Sipong Festival and later on changed back to Hudyaka) and the Christmas Festival (which showcases the city's, perhaps the province's only, giant rotating Christmas tree and colorful decors) since 1950.

A concern of the city is its liquid and solid waste management. At present, liquid wastes are emptied directly without treatment into the Bais basin. The current dump site for solid waste is due for closure, and site development for a new 12.5-hectare sanitary landfill is being finalized.

Bais is reported to be the last stronghold of the Spanish language in the Philippines, since some of the Spaniards are in the first settlement area of Negros, (and southeast of Bais) Tanjay.

== Education ==
The public schools in Bais are administered by the Schools Division of Bais City.

=== High schools ===
- Bais City National High School — Tavera Street, Hangyad
- Bais City National Science High School — Maria Longa Drive, Hangyad
- Cabugan National High School — Sitio Cabugan, Sab-ahan
- Cambagahan National High School — Sitio Lomboy, Cambagahan
- Dodong Escaño Memorial High School — Sitio Cantugot, Sab-ahan
- Governor Julian L. Teves Memorial High School — Calasga-an
- Javier Laxina I Memorial High School — Cabanlutan
- Josefina T. Valencia National High School (formerly Panala-an HS) — Panala-an
- Lonoy National High School — Lonoy
- Lucila C. Yared National High School — Sitio Caluy-ahan, Cambagahan
- Mansangaban National High School — Mansangaban
- Manuel L. Teves Memorial High School — Canlargo
- Mayor Praxedes P. Villanueva II Memorial High School — Tamisu
- Okiot National High School — Okiot
- Sto. Tomas National High School — Sitio Candigumon, Manlipac
- Tagpo National High School — Tagpo
- Tangculogan High School — Tangculogan

Integrated schools:

- Basak Integrated School - Basak
- Mabunao Integrated School (formerly Mabunao ES) — Mabunao
- Mangganay Integrated School (formerly Mangganay ES) — Sitio Mangganay, Panala-an
- Olympia Island Integrated School (formerly Olympia ES & Bais City Olympia NHS) — Olympia
- Palaypay Integrated School (formerly Palaypay ES) — Sitio Palaypay, Lonoy

=== Colleges and universities ===
- Negros Oriental State University Bais Campus 1 – Sitio San Jose, Barangay II
- Negros Oriental State University Bais Campus 2 – Quezon Street, Barangay I
- La Consolacion College Bais (formerly Sacred Heart Academy) – E.C. Villanueva St., Barangay II

== Transportation ==
Accredited Transport Cooperative as of January 2021:

- Bindoy-Mabinay Bais Transport Cooperative

== Notable personalities ==
- Demetrio Larena Sr. – first Governor of Negros Oriental
- Chanda Romero – Actress, TV Personality
- Valeen Montenegro Vicente – Actress TV Personality
- Eddie Romero – National Artist for Film and Broadcast Arts
- Jose Mari Chan – Singer, Songwriter and Businessman in the sugar industry
- Chaco Sagarbarria – current Governor of Negros Oriental
