= Philippine Nautical Highway System =

Highway system in the Philippines

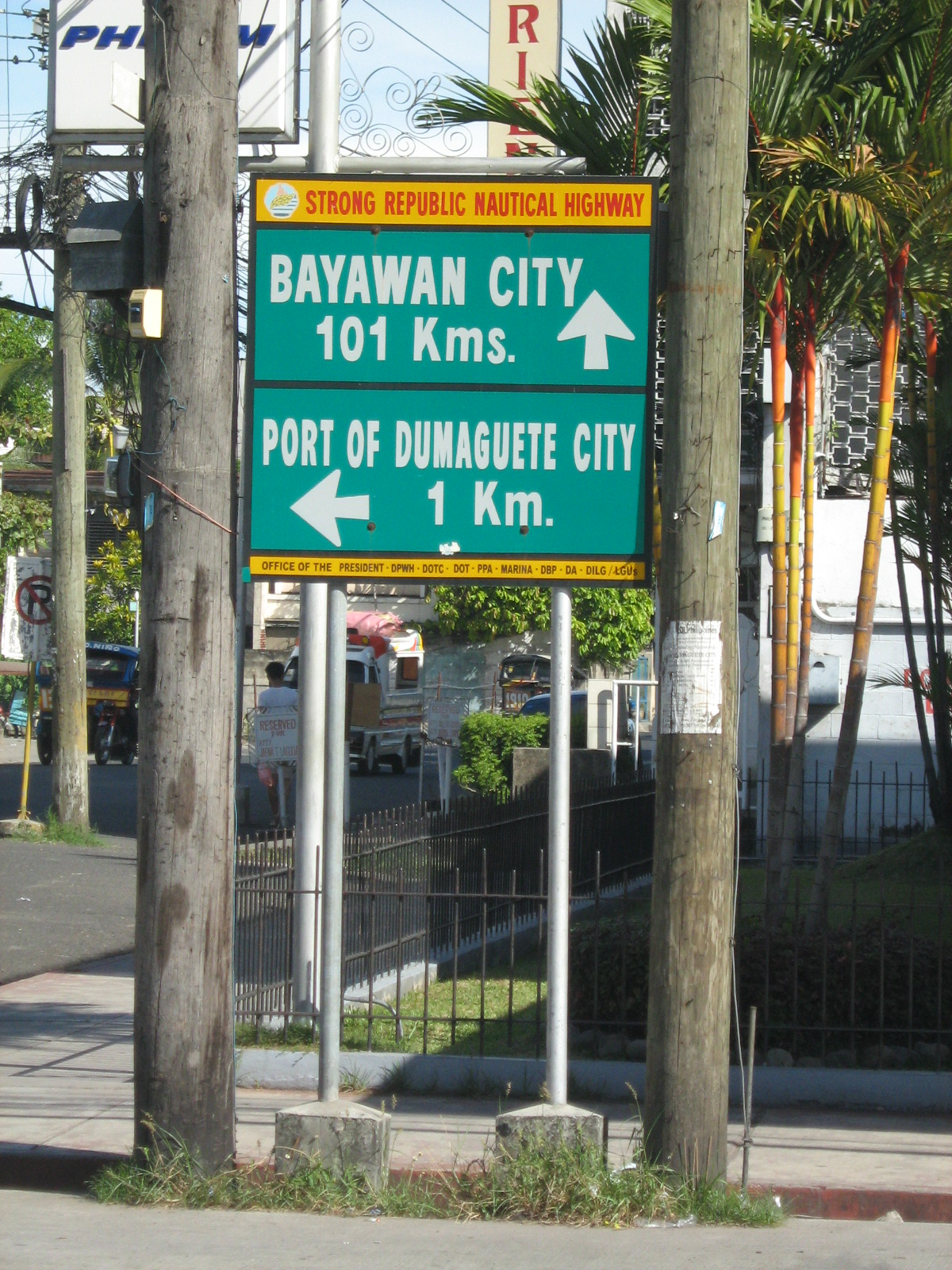
SRNH signage in Dumaguete, showing directions and distances to major cities and ports

The Philippine Nautical Highway System, also the Road Roll-on/Roll-off Terminal System (RRTS) or simply the RoRo System, is an integrated network of highway and vehicular ferry routes which forms the backbone of a nationwide vehicle transport system in the Philippines. It is a system of roads and ports developed by the Philippine government to connect the major islands of Luzon, the Visayas and Mindanao. The 919-kilometer (571 mi) nautical highway was opened to the public on April 12, 2003 as the Strong Republic Nautical Highway (SRNH).

== Detailed description and impact ==
Its route covers the provinces and cities of Tagaytay and Batangas City of Calabarzon, Marinduque, Romblon and Oriental Mindoro in Luzon; Aklan, Antique, Capiz, Iloilo, Guimaras, Negros Occidental and Negros Oriental, Siquijor, Cebu and Bohol in Visayas; and Misamis Occidental and Misamis Oriental, Lanao del Norte, and Dapitan of Zamboanga del Norte in Mindanao.

This system reduced the previous usual travel time by 17 hours to the different key cities, enhancing the accessibility of the prime tourist destinations, minimizing the handling expenses of goods all over the country.

Several bus companies operate routes using the nautical highway, including ALPS The Bus, Partas, RORO Bus Transport, Ceres Transport, Bachelor Express, Gasat/Valisno Express and Philtranco. Each operates multiple daily bus trips over the SRNH between Manila bus terminals sited in Cubao and Pasay and Iloilo City, with connections available in Iloilo for onwards transportation. The SRNH segment between Manila and Iloilo runs by road to Batangas City, by ferry to Calapan, by road to Roxas, Oriental Mindoro, by ferry to Caticlan (gateway to Boracay, located in Malay, Aklan) and onwards by road to Iloilo City. Private van transport is generally available for hire over individual SRNH road segments, and the ferry segments accept walk-aboard passengers as well as vehicles.

== Routes ==
Philippine Nautical Highway System

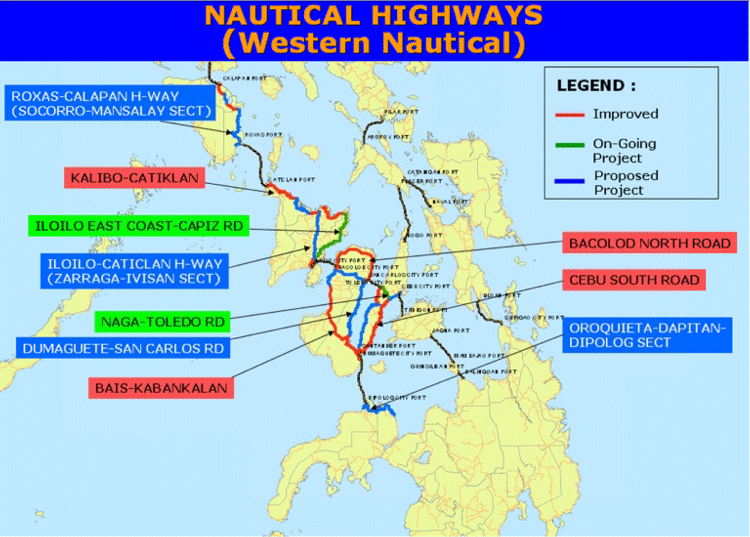
Western Nautical Highway - Batangas City, Oriental Mindoro, Western Visayas, Negros Island Region and Zamboanga Peninsula

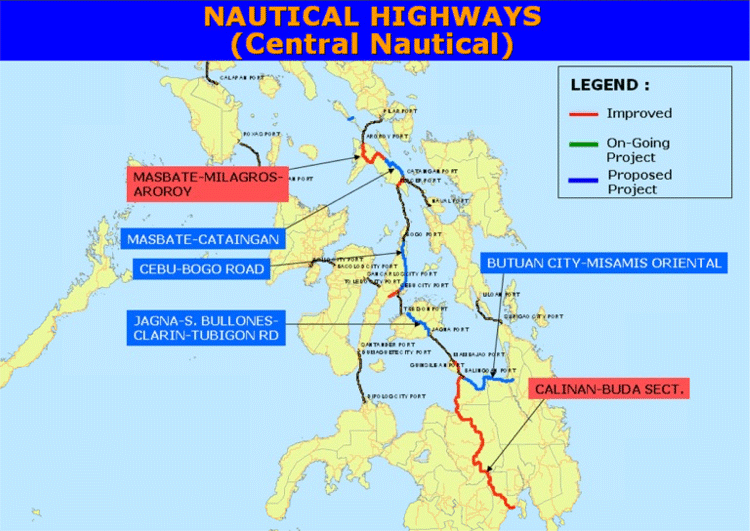
Central Nautical Highway - Sorsogon, Masbate, Central Visayas, Camiguin and Cagayan de Oro

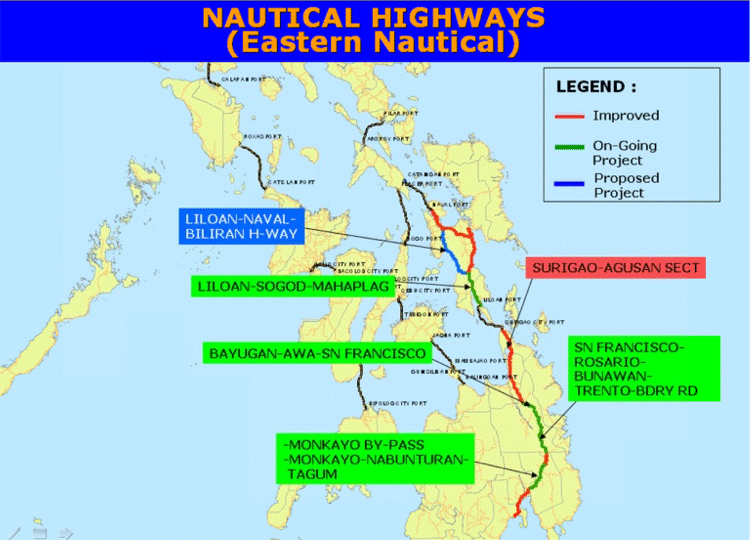
Eastern Nautical Highway - Masbate, Leyte and Southern Leyte, Dinagat Islands and Surigao del Norte

== See also ==
- Philippine highway network
- Transportation in the Philippines
- Department of Transportation
- Department of Public Works and Highways
