= Batasang Pambansa canvass for the 1986 Philippine presidential election =

The following is the official canvassing of votes by the Batasang Pambansa for the 1986 Philippine presidential election. The canvassing started on February 10, 1986 and ended on February 15, 1986.

== Members of the board of tellers ==
=== Members ===
Member	Party	District
Rodolfo Albano	KBL	Isabela
Manolito Asok	KBL	Siquijor
Salvador Britanico	KBL	Iloilo
Edmundo B. Cea	UNIDO	Camarines Sur
Concordio Diel	KBL	Misamis Oriental
Marcelo Fernan	UNIDO	Cebu City
Neptali Gonzales	UNIDO	San Juan–Mandaluyong
Aquilino Pimentel Jr.	PDP–Laban	Cagayan de Oro
Source: Batasang Pambansa

=== Alternates ===
Alternate	Party	District
Homobono Adaza	Mindanao Alliance	Misamis Oriental
Rene Cayetano	KBL	Taguig–Pateros–Muntinlupa
Antonio Cuenco	UNIDO	Cebu City
Hernando Perez	UNIDO	Batangas
Regalado Maambong	KBL	Cebu
Ramon Mitra	PDP–Laban	Palawan
Celso Palma	KBL	Tawi-Tawi
Alberto Veloso	KBL	Leyte
Source: Batasang Pambansa

== Presidential election ==
Candidate	Party	Votes	%
Ferdinand Marcos	Kilusang Bagong Lipunan	10,807,197	53.62
Corazon Aquino	United Nationalist Democratic Organization	9,291,716	46.10
Reuben Canoy	Social Democratic Party	34,041	0.17
Narciso Padilla	Movement for Truth, Order and Righteousness	23,652	0.12
Total		20,156,606	100.00
Valid votes		20,156,606	97.30
Invalid/blank votes		559,469	2.70
Total votes		20,716,075	100.00
Registered voters/turnout		26,278,744	78.83
Source: Annex XXXVIII of the report by the International Observer Delegation

Province/City	Marcos	Aquino	Canoy	Padilla
Abra	77,386	3,794	4	17
Agusan del Norte	45,587	32,928	209	10
Agusan del Sur	58,375	43,436	996	14
Aklan	63,078	64,473	10	24
Albay	75,354	159,210	28	92
Angeles City	19,898	49,923	9	300
Antique	65,225	71,694	23	15
Aurora	19,891	19,071	15	16
Bacolod City	52,591	65,321	13	52
Bago	22,400	13,195	0	0
Baguio	41,640	24,803	53	740
Bais	9,080	9,257	38	7
Basilan	26,664	30,651	11	16
Bataan	70,744	66,211	24	168
Batanes	2,808	2,994	2	7
Batangas	155,474	236,616	26	309
Batangas City	23,020	41,226	7	76
Benguet	41,756	51,826	73	1,644
Bohol	170,635	154,338	815	108
Bukidnon	115,176	113,224	2,506	46
Bulacan	219,432	275,738	127	819
Butuan	33,866	40,660	533	23
Cabanatuan	38,202	24,615	5	13
Cadiz	36,061	2,690	0	0
Cagayan	275,925	42,903	18	37
Cagayan de Oro	31,336	43,377	1,104	40
Calbayog	24,584	15,950	2	0
Caloocan	116,119	113,381	13	707
Camarines Norte	35,698	73,965	14	113
Camarines Sur	110,078	221,907	0	0
Camiguin	11,140	15,487	97	2
Canlaon	7,528	3,149	98	0
Capiz	78,130	64,078	19	8
Catanduanes	33,984	32,842	5	6
Cavite	198,574	139,574	47	769
Cavite City	30,221	15,193	5	152
Cebu	264,211	249,998	1,224	56
Cebu City	60,748	167,280	745	114
Cotabato	83,869	100,515	293	139
Cotabato City	8,803	18,931	13	12
Dagupan	22,022	23,795	10	44
Danao	57,225	342	3	1
Dapitan	12,485	9,559	210	5
Davao City	120,314	142,828	4,026	311
Davao del Norte	168,720	142,607	5,386	82
Davao del Sur	106,299	77,160	1,630	43
Davao Oriental	45,489	69,423	1,430	49
Dipolog	11,894	15,658	157	7
Dumaguete	9,963	21,808	55	35
Eastern Samar	43,680	53,764	4	3
General Santos	22,131	37,158	88	104
Gingoog	17,967	13,818	102	0
Ifugao	4,742	6,600	3	80
Iligan City	24,965	44,040	820	57
Ilocos Norte	189,897	718	2	6
Ilocos Sur	191,613	28,063	7	37
Iloilo	224,617	235,029	108	49
Iloilo City	55,282	63,708	7	12
Iriga City	9,250	17,758	0	8
Isabela	402,860	20,072	15	19
Kalinga-Apayao	77,429	10,624	49	92
La Carlota City	9,504	4,462	3	2
La Union	204,844	27,480	26	149
Laguna	180,409	220,924	83	904
Lanao del Norte	100,383	44,070	422	22
Lanao del Sur	191,755	28,676	14	1
Laoag City	43,189	888	2	4
Lapu-Lapu City	22,374	21,416	56	6
Legazpi City	16,547	26,900	4	29
Leyte	300,803	143,261	245	34
Lipa City	20,525	32,742	9	43
Lucena City	20,102	29,039	15	213
Maguindanao	182,320	57,864	108	56
Makati	110,274	91,452	68	657
Malabon–Navotas–Valenzuela	110,824	140,244	44	686
Mandaluyong–San Juan	72,118	89,145	44	1,001
Mandaue City	14,352	42,974	158	15
Manila	388,266	406,747	217	2,587
Marawi City	16,203	10,829	17	23
Marinduque	34,464	40,181	7	25
Masbate	72,154	100,128	167	18
Misamis Occidental	51,758	41,470	526	8
Misamis Oriental	81,962	60,889	1,595	49
Mountain Province	9,803	10,664	29	358
Naga City	10,874	30,080	7	28
Negros del Norte	85,721	49,703	14	9
Negros Occidental	156,595	97,292	90	51
Negros Oriental	113,402	110,187	656	30
Northern Samar	62,882	50,964	4	15
Nueva Ecija	222,095	131,814	18	116
Nueva Vizcaya	55,847	49,734	23	138
Occidental Mindoro	42,917	36,190	7	30
Olongapo City	48,339	33,710	13	97
Oriental Mindoro	71,960	87,142	7	28
Ormoc City	20,895	22,619	97	11
Oroquieta City	8,812	12,919	175	6
Ozamiz City	12,978	21,925	221	13
Pagadian City	14,009	17,219	259	2
Palawan	39,970	44,742	15	22
Palayan City	7,718	1,128	0	1
Pampanga	114,733	243,672	29	456
Pangasinan	398,138	240,565	76	400
Parañaque–Las Piñas	80,442	120,612	67	581
Pasay City	77,469	73,939	42	462
Pasig–Marikina	95,206	149,410	44	889
Puerto Princesa City	16,349	15,380	1	11
Quezon	136,312	225,672	40	378
Quezon City	272,968	342,963	197	2,750
Quirino	36,415	6,739	1	8
Rizal	130,335	160,661	36	651
Romblon	30,619	39,594	3	8
Roxas City	19,016	17,709	2	18
Samar	68,281	49,069	0	0
San Carlos City, Negros del Norte	14,454	14,069	95	4
San Carlos City, Pangasinan	19,537	19,281	0	0
San Jose City	21,017	11,966	2	10
San Pablo City	27,187	37,902	12	186
Silay City	19,448	13,889	2	0
Siquijor	20,667	23,449	21	0
Sorsogon	69,870	98,748	33	82
South Cotabato	88,091	115,629	489	141
Southern Leyte	73,934	57,258	113	134
Sultan Kudarat	53,949	41,405	114	48
Sulu	128,854	34,337	22	20
Surigao City	12,919	21,204	70	3
Surigao del Norte	58,496	77,994	364	43
Surigao del Sur	76,541	47,202	71	7
Tacloban City	32,809	18,399	10	16
Tagaytay City	5,060	3,132	1	10
Tagbilaran City	8,767	13,043	64	21
Taguig–Pateros–Muntinlupa	71,129	86,768	28	367
Tangub City	5,130	11,302	39	2
Tarlac	166,900	119,229	5	114
Tawi-Tawi	65,096	11,339	9	5
Toledo City	14,652	20,671	79	1
Trece Martires City	7,415	162	0	0
Zambales	82,782	50,151	11	174
Zamboanga City	48,943	70,136	24	305
Zamboanga del Norte	94,509	53,221	953	29
Zamboanga del Sur	138,116	123,075	2,041	116
Total	10,807,197	9,291,716	34,041	23,652
Province/City				
Province/City	Marcos	Aquino	Canoy	Padilla

== Vice presidential election ==
Candidate	Party	Votes	%
Arturo Tolentino	Kilusang Bagong Lipunan	10,134,130	50.66
Salvador Laurel	United Nationalist Democratic Organization	9,173,105	45.85
Eva Estrada Kalaw	Liberal Party (Kalaw wing) (Note: Kalaw ran under her own wing of the Liberal Party, while the rest of party supported Laurel's candidacy.)	662,185	3.31
Roger Arienda	Movement for Truth, Order and Righteousness	35,974	0.18
Total		20,005,394	100.00
Valid votes		20,005,394	96.57
Invalid/blank votes		710,681	3.43
Total votes		20,716,075	100.00
Registered voters/turnout		26,278,744	78.83
Source: Annex XXXVIII of the report by the International Observer Delegation

Province/City	Tolentino	Laurel	Kalaw	Arienda
Abra	76,233	4,441	159	33
Agusan del Norte	44,828	33,018	318	18
Agusan del Sur	56,988	43,944	340	55
Aklan	60,148	64,708	2,137	27
Albay	67,736	153,530	12,291	139
Angeles City	20,997	38,766	9,802	434
Antique	52,982	82,351	987	25
Aurora	18,739	19,565	509	29
Bacolod City	52,522	55,408	10,077	100
Bago	21,634	12,798	759	0
Baguio	40,937	22,363	3,137	763
Bais	9,200	9,035	18	4
Basilan	26,426	30,076	497	27
Bataan	68,268	62,553	5,674	347
Batanes	2,817	2,944	16	10
Batangas	31,711	359,547	2,143	547
Batangas City	5,841	58,023	441	96
Benguet	42,638	47,939	2,694	1,398
Bohol	173,802	151,177	1,514	112
Bukidnon	113,085	113,693	1,316	41
Bulacan	217,443	238,810	35,554	1,885
Butuan	34,339	39,223	990	23
Cabanatuan	36,915	24,073	1,582	62
Cadiz	29,002	4,820	39	0
Cagayan	271,381	43,823	1,305	77
Cagayan de Oro	33,941	40,372	1,032	58
Calbayog	24,228	15,255	907	4
Caloocan	115,221	98,300	13,587	1,294
Camarines Norte	33,679	75,093	596	121
Camarines Sur	90,832	239,889	1,415	82
Camiguin	10,600	15,299	674	3
Canlaon	7,416	3,136	31	0
Capiz	73,891	65,304	1,600	21
Catanduanes	33,530	32,090	875	11
Cavite	178,925	147,039	9,861	1,456
Cavite City	28,451	15,477	1,244	279
Cebu	261,461	248,213	1,532	43
Cebu City	71,266	154,221	2,493	128
Cotabato	81,789	97,645	2,956	409
Cotabato City	10,111	16,930	565	61
Dagupan	19,201	16,510	10,417	88
Danao	57,167	372	6	1
Dapitan	12,566	9,262	60	3
Davao City	128,435	127,955	7,579	514
Davao del Norte	162,444	147,857	2,454	167
Davao del Sur	103,820	77,337	1,383	129
Davao Oriental	43,188	70,938	1,145	73
Dipolog	12,623	14,651	205	12
Dumaguete	11,708	19,818	214	40
Eastern Samar	41,577	52,482	2,627	1
General Santos	21,796	31,208	5,798	284
Gingoog	17,447	13,926	77	2
Ifugao	4,334	6,281	589	92
Iligan City	29,890	38,756	579	114
Ilocos Norte	187,440	2,430	302	9
Ilocos Sur	184,184	32,937	785	48
Iloilo	195,815	238,083	22,409	52
Iloilo City	51,619	59,356	7,850	31
Iriga City	8,637	18,263	115	8
Isabela	394,085	21,016	1,008	151
Kalinga-Apayao	72,797	10,626	3,944	76
La Carlota City	9,043	4,643	168	2
La Union	197,273	31,834	2,479	205
Laguna	127,327	257,366	14,745	1,595
Lanao del Norte	94,619	46,890	297	37
Lanao del Sur	159,339	54,226	356	17
Laoag City	42,460	1,342	208	13
Lapu-Lapu City	22,596	20,887	122	4
Legazpi City	15,396	26,463	1,350	58
Leyte	296,341	142,647	2,089	42
Lipa City	7,620	41,588	4,153	60
Lucena City	14,517	33,571	933	281
Maguindanao	157,944	70,162	3,989	138
Makati	102,976	86,657	11,430	939
Malabon–Navotas–Valenzuela	113,273	120,308	15,456	1,217
Mandaluyong–San Juan	58,978	72,956	28,971	927
Mandaue City	15,905	40,989	380	23
Manila	405,086	322,773	65,249	3,904
Marawi City	14,456	12,255	114	32
Marinduque	26,997	46,621	585	54
Masbate	66,987	101,555	1,582	31
Misamis Occidental	50,573	41,842	346	11
Misamis Oriental	79,101	61,204	798	49
Mountain Province	9,407	10,340	410	260
Naga City	8,859	31,876	299	34
Negros del Norte	71,106	50,289	3,610	5
Negros Occidental	145,019	101,145	5,511	55
Negros Oriental	113,500	107,334	987	41
Northern Samar	55,675	52,448	4,675	19
Nueva Ecija	210,492	134,169	7,297	333
Nueva Vizcaya	51,352	52,080	1,161	201
Occidental Mindoro	38,336	39,730	723	69
Olongapo City	47,207	33,291	1,140	125
Oriental Mindoro	46,270	110,278	1,889	111
Ormoc City	20,616	22,277	218	16
Oroquieta City	8,782	12,843	84	5
Ozamiz City	10,161	24,571	176	18
Pagadian City	14,258	16,636	205	12
Palawan	36,056	47,742	223	48
Palayan City	6,960	1,740	113	0
Pampanga	115,287	209,700	31,419	975
Pangasinan	357,257	208,983	68,443	593
Parañaque–Las Piñas	82,288	109,043	9,592	830
Pasay City	73,926	68,968	8,106	681
Pasig–Marikina	101,009	122,873	19,946	1,341
Puerto Princesa City	15,776	15,554	250	31
Quezon	88,349	266,549	3,880	148
Quezon City	290,701	282,093	40,914	4,285
Quirino	29,114	13,768	88	13
Rizal	135,976	137,269	14,891	828
Romblon	27,372	41,803	285	31
Roxas City	18,134	17,228	1,138	29
Samar	63,110	43,484	10,051	0
San Carlos City, Negros del Norte	14,690	13,637	109	1
San Carlos City, Pangasinan	16,282	15,136	7,223	0
San Jose City	19,254	10,692	2,940	27
San Pablo City	15,706	47,457	1,689	298
Silay City	19,311	13,413	516	3
Siquijor	20,659	13,375	27	2
Sorsogon	63,305	95,577	7,131	161
South Cotabato	81,715	103,449	18,892	549
Southern Leyte	72,620	57,696	210	4
Sultan Kudarat	52,872	38,731	3,368	136
Sulu	125,083	36,651	179	17
Surigao City	13,107	20,198	735	8
Surigao del Norte	74,454	48,119	547	9
Surigao del Sur	58,064	76,957	389	99
Tacloban City	32,481	17,371	1,154	24
Tagaytay City	3,472	4,630	80	12
Tagbilaran City	10,782	10,957	150	17
Taguig–Pateros–Muntinlupa	68,405	82,191	6,512	591
Tangub City	5,122	11,250	18	0
Tarlac	161,970	113,906	7,709	346
Tawi-Tawi	59,875	12,175	552	4
Toledo City	14,970	20,051	97	2
Trece Martires City	6,159	1,202	0	1
Zambales	79,252	52,395	1,727	277
Zamboanga City	55,638	60,830	1,935	371
Zamboanga del Norte	91,862	54,177	393	45
Zamboanga del Sur	133,126	125,044	1,166	77
Total	10,134,130	9,173,105	662,185	35,974
Province/City				
Province/City	Tolentino	Laurel	Kalaw	Arienda
