= 1986 Philippine presidential election =

11th election of Philippine president

- February 7, 1986
- Turnout: 78.8% (▼2.1pp)
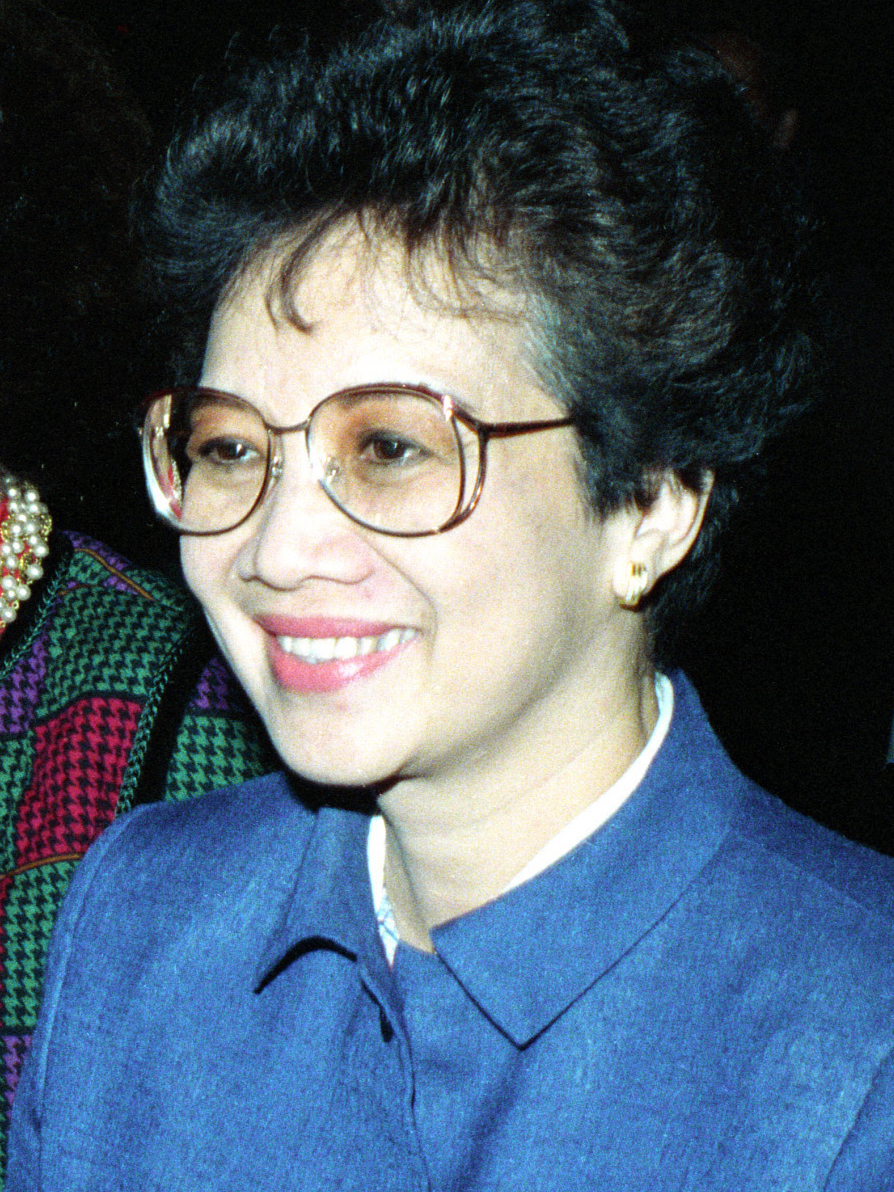

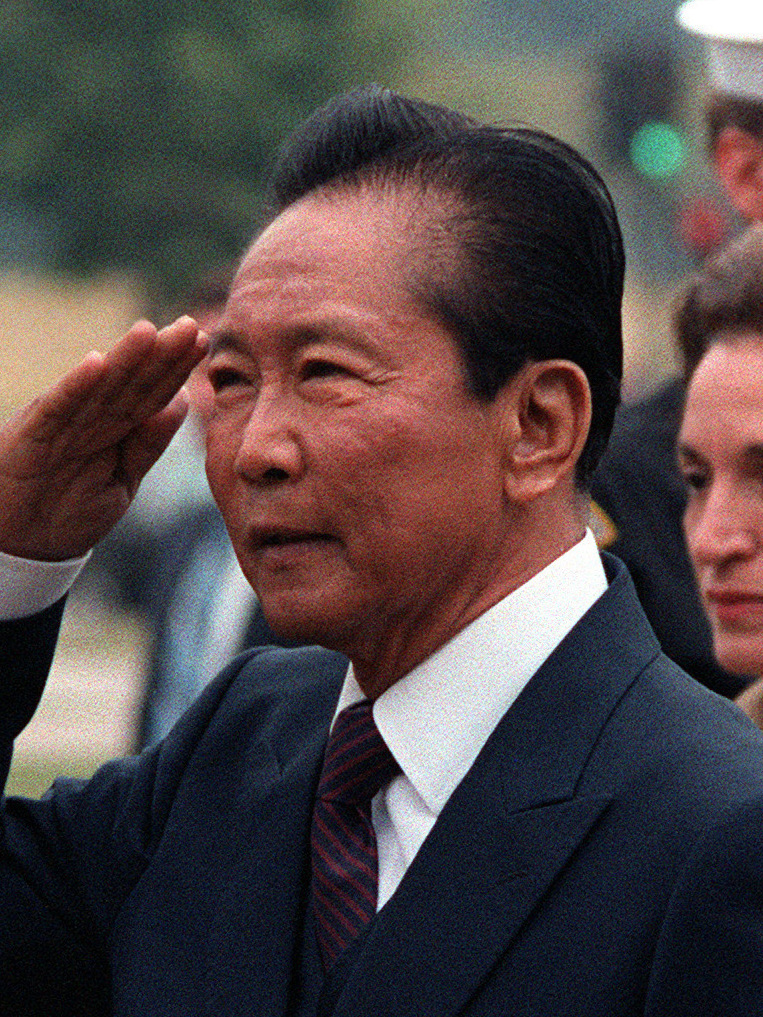
Candidate	Corazon Aquino	Ferdinand Marcos
Party	UNIDO	KBL
Running mate	Salvador Laurel	Arturo Tolentino
Popular vote	7,909,320 (NAMFREL); 9,291,716 (COMELEC)	7,376,599 (NAMFREL); 10,807,197 (COMELEC)
Percentage	51.74% (NAMFREL); 46.10% (COMELEC)	48.26% (NAMFREL); 53.62% (COMELEC)
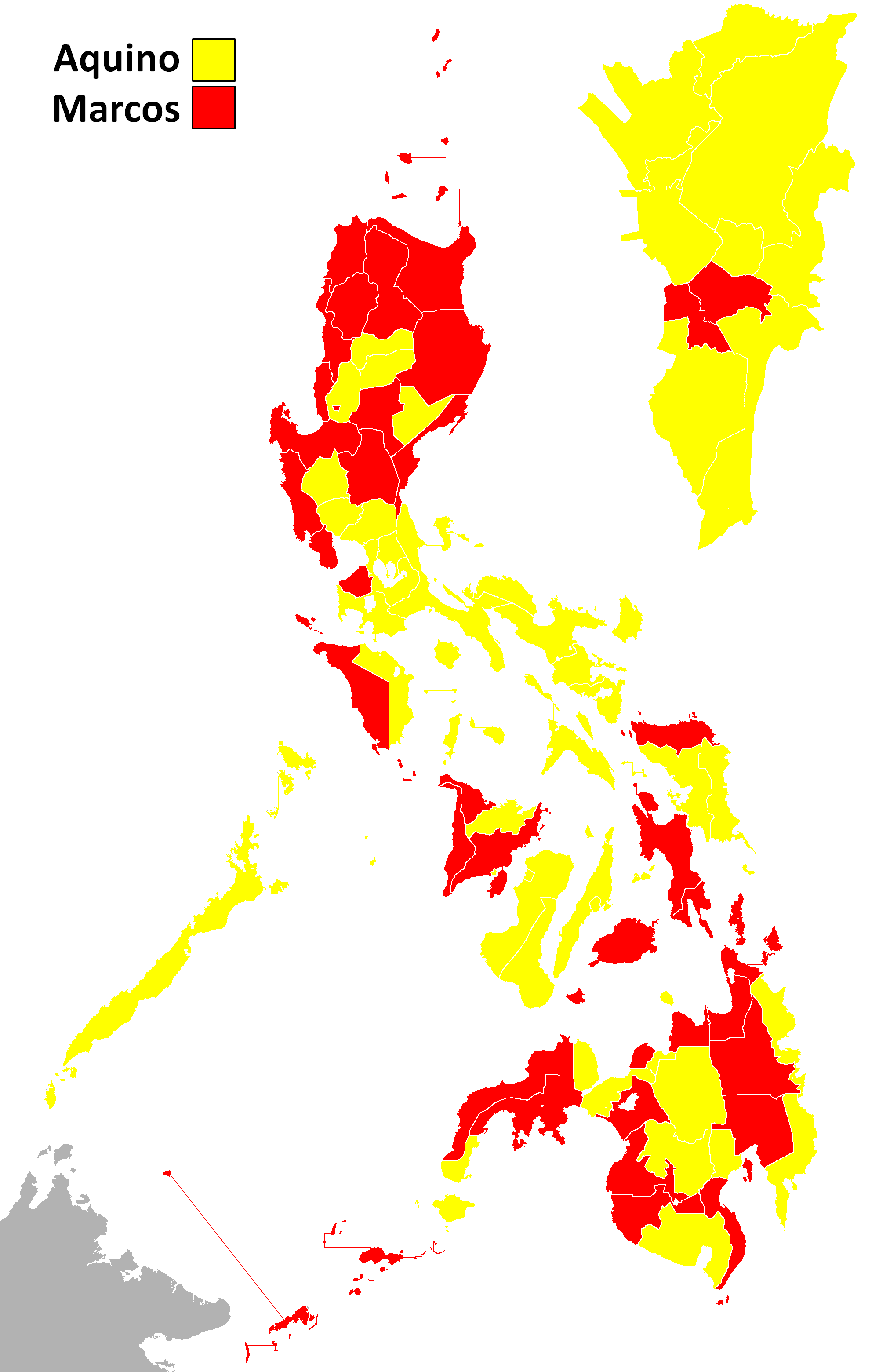
- Election results per province/city
President before election
Ferdinand Marcos
KBL
Elected President
Corazon Aquino
UNIDO
- 1986 Philippine vice presidential election
- February 7, 1986
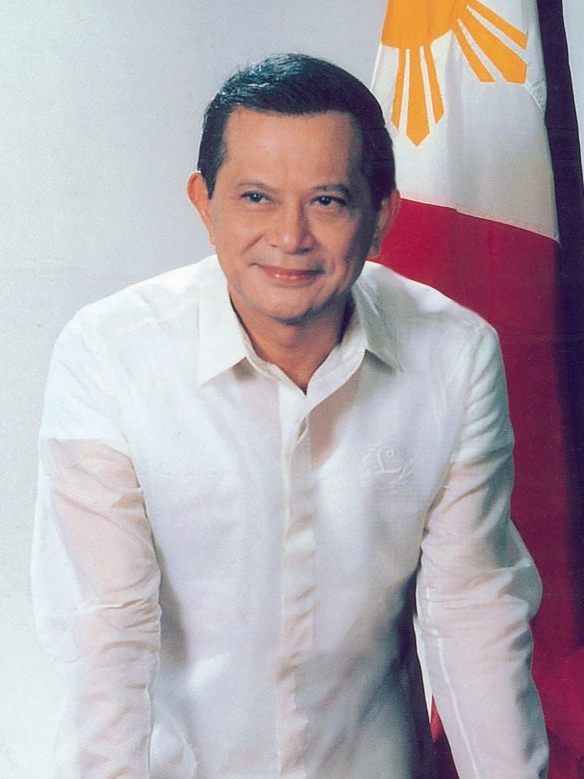

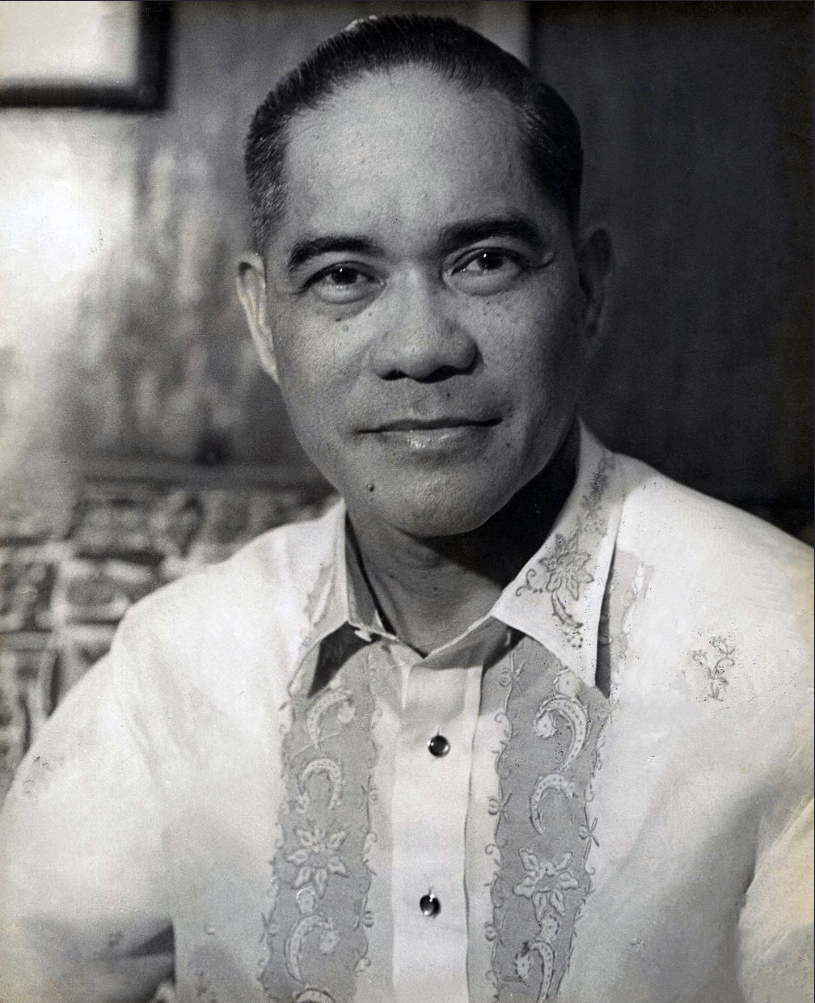
Candidate	Salvador Laurel	Arturo Tolentino
Party	UNIDO	KBL
Popular vote	7,648,570 (NAMFREL); 9,173,105 (COMELEC)	6,978,702 (NAMFREL); 10,134,130 (COMELEC)
Percentage	50.07% (NAMFREL); 45.85% (COMELEC)	45.69% (NAMFREL); 50.66% (COMELEC)
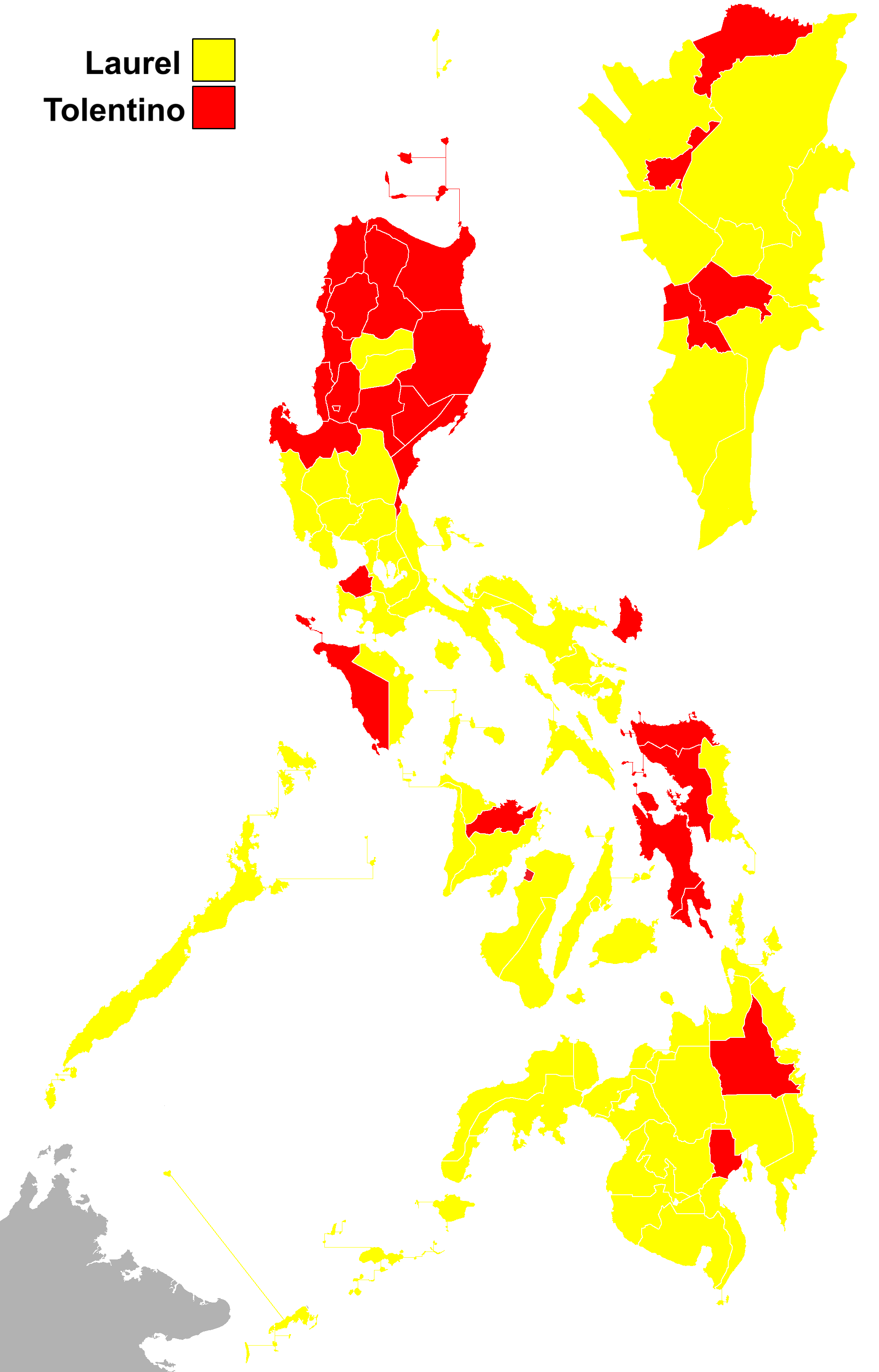
- Map showing the official results taken from provincial and city certificates of canvass. The inset shows Metro Manila.
Elected Vice President
Salvador Laurel
UNIDO

Presidential elections, commonly referred to as the 1986 snap election, were held in the Philippines on February 7, 1986. Incumbent president Ferdinand Marcos, facing pressure from the public, media, and international allies, agreed to call an election in November 1985. He was challenged by Corazon Aquino, the widow of assassinated opposition leader Ninoy Aquino.

Marcos called for the snap elections in an attempt to reassert legitimacy for his regime, which had ruled the Philippines for two decades, including a period of martial law from 1972 to 1981. However, Marcos was terminally ill and faced a series of challenges to his rule, beginning in 1983 with the Ninoy Aquino assassination, a period of rapid economic decline and civic discontent, and widespread public reporting on corruption and Marcos's misrepresentation of his military record.

The election itself was marred by substantial irregularities, political repression, and voting fraud. After the certified government results found Marcos had won, Aquino and the National Citizens' Movement for Free Elections (NAMFREL) challenged the legitimacy of the results through a campaign of mass demonstrations and civil disobedience, culminating in Marcos's deposition and exile. Aquino was inaugurated as the 11th president of the Philippines on February 25, and the Fifth Philippine Republic was established. Marcos later died in exile in Honolulu.

== Background ==
Ferdinand Marcos was elected president of the Philippines in 1965 and re-elected in 1969. Despite his 1940 conviction for murdering his father's political rival, which was overturned on appeal, Marcos built a popular public image on his service record in World War II, when he was held as a prisoner of war by the Imperial Japanese Army, and his support for public spending on infrastructure projects. Throughout his political career, Marcos often exaggerated or misrepresented his military record, including claiming during his 1962 campaign for the Senate that he was "the most decorated war hero of the Philippines."

As president, Marcos received support from the Philippine armed forces and the United States, where he supported presidents Lyndon B. Johnson and Richard Nixon in the Vietnam War. Following a period of social unrest, political violence, and a balance of payments crisis, and facing a two-term constitutional limit, Marcos declared martial law in September 1972, establishing himself as dictator through a 1973 constitutional plebiscite. He cited threats by radical communists and Muslim separatists, as well as the failed 1971 constitutional convention, to support his rule; critics accused him of exaggerating these threats to silence opposition. Martial law was lifted in January 1981.

=== Assassination of Ninoy Aquino ===
During the period of martial law, Marcos marginalized and suppressed opposition politicians. Among the leaders of the opposition was Ninoy Aquino, who had been sentenced to death by a military commission but whom Marcos permitted to travel to the United States in 1980 for emergency triple bypass surgery. Aquino remained in the United States for three years, working at Harvard University, writing, lecturing, and becoming an iconic symbol of Philippine democracy and resistance to military rule.

In 1983, Aquino returned to the Philippines, as stipulated in the conditions for his release from prison. At the time, Marcos was seriously ill, and Aquino believed he could persuade Marcos to restore democracy before his death. However, Aquino was shot and killed aboard China Airlines Flight 811 while taxing at Manila International Airport. Sixteen military officers were later convicted for their involvement in the murder; while the Aquino family believed that Marcos had ordered it, no definitive proof has ever surfaced.

The assassination revived the domestic opposition, including in the press, and elevated Aquino's wife, Corazon, to the role of a central opposition figure. In the 1984 parliamentary elections, the opposition re-established its political power by winning thirty-five seats in the National Assembly under the banner of the United Nationalist Democratic Organization (UNIDO).

=== Influence of international media ===
The end of military rule and the Aquino assassination led to increased scrutiny of the Marcos regime by the domestic and international press, beginning with a December 1982 article by Eduardo Lachica in The Wall Street Journal Asia, investigating the Marcos family's landholdings in New York City. The story was picked up in January 1985 by the San Jose Mercury News as part of a story on capital flight in the Philippines involving the Marcoses and their allies. Investigative reporters at the Mercury News revealed extensive holdings by members of the Philippine elite in New York, Chicago, and the San Francisco Bay Area. The series was reprinted in several Philippine local sources, leading to mass protests and an attempt to begin impeachment proceedings against Marcos. Marcos acceded to a brief independent inquiry into his conduct.

Additional reporting in the Mercury News, The Washington Post, The Wall Street Journal, and The New York Times further painted the Marcos regime as a kleptocracy which extracted money from the United States, including money intended for humanitarian or other aid, and the Philippine public for personal gain. Although Marcos denied the allegations, they severely damaged his support in the United States and the Philippines.

=== Declaration of election ===
On November 4, 1985, Sam Donaldson and George Will interviewed Marcos on the American Broadcasting Company political affairs program This Week with David Brinkley. Marcos was being asked about his policies and public support when, without warning, he announced that he would hold a snap election on February 7, 1986, a year earlier than the supposed 1987 election. Marcos said that in the snap election, the vice president would also be determined, but that the final decision regarding the election would be determined by the National Assembly. Despite initial concerns that the National Assembly, which was controlled by Marcos's New Society Movement, would not hold the elections, they passed a law on December 3, 1985, setting the date of the election on February 7, 1986.

== Candidates and nominations ==
The opposition was divided between Corazon Aquino, the widow of their assassinated leader, and Salvador Laurel, the son of former president Jose P. Laurel. Archbishop of Manila Jaime Sin talked to both candidates. Aquino was hesitant to run but said she would be willing to run if a petition campaign with at least a million signatures supported her. Doy was earnest to run, since he believed his family background, training, and experience had prepared him for the presidency.

== Campaign ==
The campaign period lasted 45 days from December 19, 1985, to February 5, 1986.

As the election campaign continued, Marcos was able to campaign in selected key cities while Aquino was able to campaign intensively and extensively, even going to remote places from the north of the Philippines to the south of the Philippines. The Aquino campaign concluded a rally in Rizal Park and Roxas Boulevard that is believed to have 800,000 participants, forming a "sea of yellow".

On February 4, Marcos declared February 6 and 7 as nationwide public holidays to "give all registered voters fullest opportunity to exercise their right of suffrage."

== Election related violence ==
Election related violence was prevalent throughout the campaign period - escalating until the day of the election and persisting even after the polls closed while the votes were being counted. Supporters, candidates, and organizers were assassinated in both planned assassinations and spontaneous disputes. Precincts were attacked by armed men and poll watchers were attacked, often while conveying the ballot boxes. Among the prominent killings were those of activists Amanteflor Torres in Cagayan, Michael Sumilang in Quezon Province, opposition organizers Jeremias de Jesus in Tarlac and Evelio Javier in Antique province and poll watchers Rodrigo Ponce in Capiz, Salvador Leaño in Romblon, and Francisco Laurella, Fernando Pastor Sr., and Fernando Pastor Jr. in Quirino Province.

== Results ==
About 85,000 precincts opened at seven o'clock in the morning of Election Day. Each precinct was administered by a Board of Election Inspectors (BEI), which was tasked to oversee voting. The BEI did not continuously abide by the stipulated voting procedure, which raised the impression of fraud.

The voting period was also scheduled to close at three o'clock in the afternoon but was extended to give way for people who were in line. Counting of the ballots followed and in most precincts was able to finish by six o'clock in the evening.

Results showed that a huge percentage of eligible voters did not vote. Out of the 26 million registered voters, only 20 million ballots were cast. This showed a decreased percentage of voters from the 1984 election, which had 89% of registered voters cast their ballots, to around 76% during the snap election.

Number of voters in the 1986 election
Number of registered voters	26,181,829
Actual number of votes canvassed by the Batasan	20,150,160
Percentage of actual to registered voters	76.96%

A number of disenfranchised voters were evident during the snap election.

Estimated number of disenfranchised voters
1984 percentage of actual to registered voters	89%
1986 number of voters based on the 1984 percentage	23,422,264
Actual number of votes canvassed by the Batasan	20,150,160
Estimated number of disenfranchised voters	3,272,104

=== COMELEC tally for president ===
Candidate	Party	Votes	%
Ferdinand Marcos (incumbent)	Kilusang Bagong Lipunan	10,807,197	53.62
Corazon Aquino	United Nationalist Democratic Organization	9,291,716	46.10
Reuben Canoy	Social Democratic Party	34,041	0.17
Narciso Padilla	Movement for Truth, Order and Righteousness	23,652	0.12
Total		20,156,606	100.00
Valid votes		20,156,606	97.30
Invalid/blank votes		559,469	2.70
Total votes		20,716,075	100.00
Registered voters/turnout		26,278,744	78.83
Source: Annex XXXVIII of the report by the International Observer Delegation

Popular vote
Marcos	53.62%
Aquino	46.10%
Others	0.28%

The COMELEC proclaimed Marcos as the winner, receiving more than 1.5 million votes more than Aquino. In the COMELEC's tally, a total of 10,807,197 votes was for Marcos alone. Conversely, NAMFREL's partial tally had Aquino leading with more than half a million votes.

==== By region ====
Region	Marcos		Aquino		Canoy		Padilla	
Region	Votes	%	Votes	%	Votes	%	Votes	%
Metro Manila	1,394,815	46.17	1,614,622	53.45	794	0.03	10,687	0.35
I	1,239,825	74.00	431,877	25.78	282	0.02	3,399	0.20
II	856,026	85.93	139,666	14.02	111	0.01	381	0.04
III	1,011,860	50.03	1,008,157	49.85	243	0.01	2,268	0.11
IV	1,190,804	45.45	1,425,143	54.39	336	0.01	3,831	0.15
V	433,809	36.27	761,538	63.67	258	0.02	376	0.03
VI	902,682	53.71	777,312	46.25	386	0.02	244	0.01
VII	773,604	48.17	827,912	51.55	4,012	0.25	394	0.02
VIII	627,868	60.38	411,284	39.55	475	0.05	213	0.02
IX	540,570	59.41	365,195	40.13	3,686	0.41	505	0.06
X	563,547	51.61	519,841	47.61	8,244	0.76	223	0.02
XI	609,540	47.38	662,799	51.52	13,413	1.04	773	0.06
XII	662,247	65.52	346,330	34.27	1,801	0.18	358	0.04
Total	10,807,197	53.62	9,291,716	46.10	34,041	0.17	23,652	0.12
Source: Batasang Pambansa

==== By province and city ====
Province/City	Marcos		Aquino		Canoy		Padilla	
Province/City	Votes	%	Votes	%	Votes	%	Votes	%
Abra	77,386	95.30	3,794	4.67	4	0.00	17	0.02
Agusan del Norte	45,587	57.90	32,928	41.82	209	0.27	10	0.01
Agusan del Sur	58,375	56.77	43,436	42.24	996	0.97	14	0.01
Aklan	63,078	49.44	64,473	50.53	10	0.01	24	0.02
Albay	75,354	32.11	159,210	67.84	28	0.01	92	0.04
Angeles City	19,898	28.37	49,923	71.19	9	0.01	300	0.43
Antique	65,225	47.62	71,694	52.35	23	0.02	15	0.01
Aurora	19,891	51.01	19,071	48.91	15	0.04	16	0.04
Bacolod	52,591	44.58	65,321	55.37	13	0.01	52	0.04
Bago	22,400	62.93	13,195	37.07	0	0.00	0	0.00
Baguio	41,640	61.93	24,803	36.89	53	0.08	740	1.10
Bais	9,080	49.40	9,257	50.36	38	0.21	7	0.04
Basilan	26,664	46.50	30,651	53.45	11	0.02	16	0.03
Bataan	70,744	51.58	66,211	48.28	24	0.02	168	0.12
Batanes	2,808	48.32	2,994	51.52	2	0.03	7	0.12
Batangas	155,474	39.62	236,616	60.30	26	0.01	309	0.08
Batangas City	23,020	35.78	41,226	64.09	7	0.01	76	0.12
Benguet	41,756	43.82	51,826	54.38	73	0.08	1,644	1.73
Bohol	170,635	52.36	154,338	47.36	815	0.25	108	0.03
Bukidnon	115,176	49.87	113,224	49.02	2,506	1.09	46	0.02
Bulacan	219,432	44.23	275,738	55.58	127	0.03	819	0.17
Butuan	33,866	45.11	40,660	54.15	533	0.71	23	0.03
Cabanatuan	38,202	60.80	24,615	39.17	5	0.01	13	0.02
Cadiz	36,061	93.06	2,690	6.94	0	0.00	0	0.00
Cagayan	275,925	86.53	42,903	13.45	18	0.01	37	0.01
Cagayan de Oro	31,336	41.31	43,377	57.18	1,104	1.46	40	0.05
Calbayog	24,584	60.65	15,950	39.35	2	0.00	0	0.00
Caloocan	116,119	50.44	113,381	49.25	13	0.01	707	0.31
Camarines Norte	35,698	32.51	73,965	67.37	14	0.01	113	0.10
Camarines Sur	110,078	33.16	221,907	66.84	0	0.00	0	0.00
Camiguin	11,140	41.68	15,487	57.95	97	0.36	2	0.01
Canlaon	7,528	69.87	3,149	29.23	98	0.91	0	0.00
Capiz	78,130	54.93	64,078	45.05	19	0.01	8	0.01
Catanduanes	33,984	50.85	32,842	49.14	5	0.01	6	0.01
Cavite	198,574	58.58	139,574	41.18	47	0.01	769	0.23
Cavite City	30,221	66.32	15,193	33.34	5	0.01	152	0.33
Cebu	264,211	51.25	249,998	48.50	1,224	0.24	56	0.01
Cebu City	60,748	26.54	167,280	73.08	745	0.33	114	0.05
Cotabato	83,869	45.38	100,515	54.39	293	0.16	139	0.08
Cotabato City	8,803	31.71	18,931	68.20	13	0.05	12	0.04
Dagupan	22,022	48.01	23,795	51.87	10	0.02	44	0.10
Danao	57,225	99.40	342	0.59	3	0.01	1	0.00
Dapitan	12,485	56.09	9,559	42.94	210	0.94	5	0.02
Davao City	120,314	44.98	142,828	53.40	4,026	1.51	311	0.12
Davao del Norte	168,720	53.26	142,607	45.02	5,386	1.70	82	0.03
Davao del Sur	106,299	57.42	77,160	41.68	1,630	0.88	43	0.02
Davao Oriental	45,489	39.08	69,423	59.65	1,430	1.23	49	0.04
Dipolog	11,894	42.91	15,658	56.49	157	0.57	7	0.03
Dumaguete	9,963	31.27	21,808	68.45	55	0.17	35	0.11
Eastern Samar	43,680	44.82	53,764	55.17	4	0.00	3	0.00
General Santos	22,131	37.21	37,158	62.47	88	0.15	104	0.17
Gingoog	17,967	56.35	13,818	43.33	102	0.32	0	0.00
Ifugao	4,742	41.51	6,600	57.77	3	0.03	80	0.70
Iligan	24,965	35.72	44,040	63.02	820	1.17	57	0.08
Ilocos Norte	189,897	99.62	718	0.38	2	0.00	6	0.00
Ilocos Sur	191,613	87.21	28,063	12.77	7	0.00	37	0.02
Iloilo	224,617	48.85	235,029	51.12	108	0.02	49	0.01
Iloilo City	55,282	46.45	63,708	53.53	7	0.01	12	0.01
Iriga City	9,250	34.24	17,758	65.73	0	0.00	8	0.03
Isabela	402,860	95.25	20,072	4.75	15	0.00	19	0.00
Kalinga-Apayao	77,429	87.79	10,624	12.05	49	0.06	92	0.10
La Carlota	9,504	68.03	4,462	31.94	3	0.02	2	0.01
La Union	204,844	88.11	27,480	11.82	26	0.01	149	0.06
Laguna	180,409	44.84	220,924	54.91	83	0.02	904	0.22
Lanao del Norte	100,383	69.28	44,070	30.41	422	0.29	22	0.02
Lanao del Sur	191,755	86.99	28,676	13.01	14	0.01	1	0.00
Laoag	43,189	97.97	888	2.01	2	0.00	4	0.01
Lapu-Lapu City	22,374	51.02	21,416	48.84	56	0.13	6	0.01
Legazpi City	16,547	38.06	26,900	61.87	4	0.01	29	0.07
Leyte	300,803	67.70	143,261	32.24	245	0.06	34	0.01
Lipa	20,525	38.49	32,742	61.41	9	0.02	43	0.08
Lucena	20,102	40.72	29,039	58.82	15	0.03	213	0.43
Maguindanao	182,320	75.86	57,864	24.08	108	0.04	56	0.02
Makati	110,274	54.47	91,452	45.17	68	0.03	657	0.32
Malabon–Navotas–Valenzuela	110,824	44.01	140,244	55.70	44	0.02	686	0.27
Mandaluyong–San Juan	72,118	44.43	89,145	54.92	44	0.03	1,001	0.62
Mandaue	14,352	24.96	42,974	74.74	158	0.27	15	0.03
Manila	388,266	48.67	406,747	50.98	217	0.03	2,587	0.32
Marawi	16,203	59.85	10,829	40.00	17	0.06	23	0.08
Marinduque	34,464	46.15	40,181	53.81	7	0.01	25	0.03
Masbate	72,154	41.84	100,128	58.06	167	0.10	18	0.01
Misamis Occidental	51,758	55.20	41,470	44.23	526	0.56	8	0.01
Misamis Oriental	81,962	56.72	60,889	42.14	1,595	1.10	49	0.03
Mountain Province	9,803	47.01	10,664	51.14	29	0.14	358	1.72
Naga	10,874	26.53	30,080	73.39	7	0.02	28	0.07
Negros del Norte	85,721	63.29	49,703	36.70	14	0.01	9	0.01
Negros Occidental	156,595	61.64	97,292	38.30	90	0.04	51	0.02
Negros Oriental	113,402	50.56	110,187	49.13	656	0.29	30	0.01
Northern Samar	62,882	55.23	50,964	44.76	4	0.00	15	0.01
Nueva Ecija	222,095	62.73	131,814	37.23	18	0.01	116	0.03
Nueva Vizcaya	55,847	52.81	49,734	47.03	23	0.02	138	0.13
Occidental Mindoro	42,917	54.23	36,190	45.73	7	0.01	30	0.04
Olongapo	48,339	58.84	33,710	41.03	13	0.02	97	0.12
Oriental Mindoro	71,960	45.22	87,142	54.76	7	0.00	28	0.02
Ormoc	20,895	47.90	22,619	51.85	97	0.22	11	0.03
Oroquieta	8,812	40.22	12,919	58.96	175	0.80	6	0.03
Ozamiz	12,978	36.94	21,925	62.40	221	0.63	13	0.04
Pagadian	14,009	44.49	17,219	54.68	259	0.82	2	0.01
Palawan	39,970	47.16	44,742	52.79	15	0.02	22	0.03
Palayan	7,718	87.24	1,128	12.75	0	0.00	1	0.01
Pampanga	114,733	31.97	243,672	67.90	29	0.01	456	0.13
Pangasinan	398,138	62.29	240,565	37.64	76	0.01	400	0.06
Parañaque–Las Piñas	80,442	39.88	120,612	59.80	67	0.03	581	0.29
Pasay	77,469	51.00	73,939	48.67	42	0.03	462	0.30
Pasig–Marikina	95,206	38.77	149,410	60.85	44	0.02	889	0.36
Puerto Princesa City	16,349	51.51	15,380	48.45	1	0.00	11	0.03
Quezon	136,312	37.61	225,672	62.27	40	0.01	378	0.10
Quezon City	272,968	44.11	342,963	55.42	197	0.03	2,750	0.44
Quirino	36,415	84.37	6,739	15.61	1	0.00	8	0.02
Rizal	130,335	44.68	160,661	55.08	36	0.01	651	0.22
Romblon	30,619	43.60	39,594	56.38	3	0.00	8	0.01
Roxas City	19,016	51.75	17,709	48.19	2	0.01	18	0.05
Samar	68,281	58.19	49,069	41.81	0	0.00	0	0.00
San Carlos, Negros del Norte	14,454	50.50	14,069	49.15	95	0.33	4	0.01
San Carlos, Pangasinan	19,537	50.33	19,281	49.67	0	0.00	0	0.00
San Jose	21,017	63.70	11,966	36.27	2	0.01	10	0.03
San Pablo	27,187	41.64	37,902	58.05	12	0.02	186	0.28
Silay City	19,448	58.33	13,889	41.66	2	0.01	0	0.00
Siquijor	20,667	46.82	23,449	53.13	21	0.05	0	0.00
Sorsogon	69,870	41.41	98,748	58.52	33	0.02	82	0.05
South Cotabato	88,091	43.11	115,629	56.58	489	0.24	141	0.07
Southern Leyte	73,934	56.25	57,258	43.56	113	0.09	134	0.10
Sultan Kudarat	53,949	56.48	41,405	43.35	114	0.12	48	0.05
Sulu	128,854	78.94	34,337	21.04	22	0.01	20	0.01
Surigao City	12,919	37.78	21,204	62.01	70	0.20	3	0.01
Surigao del Norte	58,496	42.73	77,994	56.97	364	0.27	43	0.03
Surigao del Sur	76,541	61.82	47,202	38.12	71	0.06	7	0.01
Tacloban	32,809	64.04	18,399	35.91	10	0.02	16	0.03
Tagaytay	5,060	61.68	3,132	38.18	1	0.01	10	0.12
Tagbilaran	8,767	40.04	13,043	59.57	64	0.29	21	0.10
Taguig–Pateros–Muntinlupa	71,129	44.94	86,768	54.82	28	0.02	367	0.23
Tangub	5,130	31.14	11,302	68.61	39	0.24	2	0.01
Tarlac	166,900	58.31	119,229	41.65	5	0.00	114	0.04
Tawi-Tawi	65,096	85.15	11,339	14.83	9	0.01	5	0.01
Toledo	14,652	41.39	20,671	58.39	79	0.22	1	0.00
Trece Martires	7,415	97.86	162	2.14	0	0.00	0	0.00
Zambales	82,782	62.19	50,151	37.67	11	0.01	174	0.13
Zamboanga City	48,943	40.99	70,136	58.74	24	0.02	305	0.26
Zamboanga del Norte	94,509	63.55	53,221	35.79	953	0.64	29	0.02
Zamboanga del Sur	138,116	52.45	123,075	46.73	2,041	0.78	116	0.04
Total	10,807,197	53.62	9,291,716	46.10	34,041	0.17	23,652	0.12
Source: Batasang Pambansa

=== COMELEC tally for vice president ===
Candidate	Party	Votes	%
Arturo Tolentino	Kilusang Bagong Lipunan	10,134,130	50.66
Salvador Laurel	United Nationalist Democratic Organization	9,173,105	45.85
Eva Estrada Kalaw	Liberal Party (Kalaw wing) (Note: Kalaw ran under her own wing of the Liberal Party, while the rest of party supported Laurel's candidacy.)	662,185	3.31
Roger Arienda	Movement for Truth, Order and Righteousness	35,974	0.18
Total		20,005,394	100.00
Valid votes		20,005,394	96.57
Invalid/blank votes		710,681	3.43
Total votes		20,716,075	100.00
Registered voters/turnout		26,278,744	78.83
Source: Annex XXXVIII of the report by the International Observer Delegation

Popular vote
Tolentino	50.66%
Laurel	45.85%
Others	3.49%

==== By region ====
Region	Tolentino		Laurel		Kalaw		Arienda	
Region	Votes	%	Votes	%	Votes	%	Votes	%
Metro Manila	1,411,863	47.32	1,336,162	44.78	219,763	7.37	16,009	0.54
I	1,173,312	70.37	394,255	23.65	96,257	5.77	3,410	0.20
II	825,886	83.83	150,538	15.28	8,111	0.82	620	0.06
III	984,045	48.86	920,095	45.69	104,957	5.21	4,811	0.24
IV	853,600	32.72	1,691,011	64.81	58,524	2.24	5,974	0.23
V	388,961	32.70	774,336	65.09	25,654	2.16	645	0.05
VI	814,916	49.23	783,183	47.31	56,910	3.44	351	0.02
VII	790,432	49.46	799,565	50.04	7,571	0.47	417	0.03
VIII	606,648	58.76	403,660	39.10	21,931	2.12	110	0.01
IX	531,457	59.27	359,502	40.09	5,192	0.58	568	0.06
X	552,528	51.17	519,502	48.11	7,451	0.69	300	0.03
XI	599,462	47.03	635,701	49.87	37,640	2.95	1,815	0.14
XII	601,020	60.72	375,595	37.95	12,224	1.24	944	0.10
Total	10,134,130	50.66	9,173,105	45.85	662,185	3.31	35,974	0.18
Source: Batasang Pambansa

==== By province and city ====
Province/City	Tolentino		Laurel		Kalaw		Arienda	
Province/City	Votes	%	Votes	%	Votes	%	Votes	%
Abra	76,233	94.27	4,441	5.49	159	0.20	33	0.04
Agusan del Norte	44,828	57.34	33,018	42.23	318	0.41	18	0.02
Agusan del Sur	56,988	56.24	43,944	43.37	340	0.34	55	0.05
Aklan	60,148	47.35	64,708	50.94	2,137	1.68	27	0.02
Albay	67,736	28.98	153,530	65.70	12,291	5.26	139	0.06
Angeles City	20,997	30.00	38,766	55.38	9,802	14.00	434	0.62
Antique	52,982	38.86	82,351	60.40	987	0.72	25	0.02
Aurora	18,739	48.24	19,565	50.37	509	1.31	29	0.07
Bacolod	52,522	44.47	55,408	46.91	10,077	8.53	100	0.08
Bago	21,634	61.48	12,798	36.37	759	2.16	0	0.00
Baguio	40,937	60.92	22,363	33.28	3,137	4.67	763	1.14
Bais	9,200	50.39	9,035	49.49	18	0.10	4	0.02
Basilan	26,426	46.34	30,076	52.74	497	0.87	27	0.05
Bataan	68,268	49.89	62,553	45.71	5,674	4.15	347	0.25
Batanes	2,817	48.68	2,944	50.87	16	0.28	10	0.17
Batangas	31,711	8.05	359,547	91.27	2,143	0.54	547	0.14
Batangas City	5,841	9.07	58,023	90.10	441	0.68	96	0.15
Benguet	42,638	45.04	47,939	50.64	2,694	2.85	1,398	1.48
Bohol	173,802	53.21	151,177	46.29	1,514	0.46	112	0.03
Bukidnon	113,085	49.57	113,693	49.84	1,316	0.58	41	0.02
Bulacan	217,443	44.04	238,810	48.37	35,554	7.20	1,885	0.38
Butuan	34,339	46.05	39,223	52.60	990	1.33	23	0.03
Cabanatuan	36,915	58.94	24,073	38.44	1,582	2.53	62	0.10
Cadiz	29,002	85.65	4,820	14.23	39	0.12	0	0.00
Cagayan	271,381	85.72	43,823	13.84	1,305	0.41	77	0.02
Cagayan de Oro	33,941	45.01	40,372	53.54	1,032	1.37	58	0.08
Calbayog	24,228	59.98	15,255	37.77	907	2.25	4	0.01
Caloocan	115,221	50.45	98,300	43.04	13,587	5.95	1,294	0.57
Camarines Norte	33,679	30.76	75,093	68.58	596	0.54	121	0.11
Camarines Sur	90,832	27.34	239,889	72.21	1,415	0.43	82	0.02
Camiguin	10,600	39.89	15,299	57.57	674	2.54	3	0.01
Canlaon	7,416	70.07	3,136	29.63	31	0.29	0	0.00
Capiz	73,891	52.47	65,304	46.38	1,600	1.14	21	0.01
Catanduanes	33,530	50.42	32,090	48.25	875	1.32	11	0.02
Cavite	178,925	53.05	147,039	43.60	9,861	2.92	1,456	0.43
Cavite City	28,451	62.60	15,477	34.05	1,244	2.74	279	0.61
Cebu	261,461	51.14	248,213	48.55	1,532	0.30	43	0.01
Cebu City	71,266	31.24	154,221	67.61	2,493	1.09	128	0.06
Cotabato	81,789	44.74	97,645	53.42	2,956	1.62	409	0.22
Cotabato City	10,111	36.55	16,930	61.19	565	2.04	61	0.22
Dagupan	19,201	41.55	16,510	35.72	10,417	22.54	88	0.19
Danao	57,167	99.34	372	0.65	6	0.01	1	0.00
Dapitan	12,566	57.40	9,262	42.31	60	0.27	3	0.01
Davao City	128,435	48.56	127,955	48.38	7,579	2.87	514	0.19
Davao del Norte	162,444	51.91	147,857	47.25	2,454	0.78	167	0.05
Davao del Sur	103,820	56.84	77,337	42.34	1,383	0.76	129	0.07
Davao Oriental	43,188	37.44	70,938	61.50	1,145	0.99	73	0.06
Dipolog	12,623	45.92	14,651	53.29	205	0.75	12	0.04
Dumaguete	11,708	36.84	19,818	62.36	214	0.67	40	0.13
Eastern Samar	41,577	43.00	52,482	54.28	2,627	2.72	1	0.00
General Santos	21,796	36.89	31,208	52.82	5,798	9.81	284	0.48
Gingoog	17,447	55.47	13,926	44.28	77	0.24	2	0.01
Ifugao	4,334	38.37	6,281	55.60	589	5.21	92	0.81
Iligan	29,890	43.11	38,756	55.89	579	0.84	114	0.16
Ilocos Norte	187,440	98.56	2,430	1.28	302	0.16	9	0.00
Ilocos Sur	184,184	84.51	32,937	15.11	785	0.36	48	0.02
Iloilo	195,815	42.91	238,083	52.17	22,409	4.91	52	0.01
Iloilo City	51,619	43.43	59,356	49.94	7,850	6.60	31	0.03
Iriga	8,637	31.96	18,263	67.58	115	0.43	8	0.03
Isabela	394,085	94.67	21,016	5.05	1,008	0.24	151	0.04
Kalinga-Apayao	72,797	83.25	10,626	12.15	3,944	4.51	76	0.09
La Carlota	9,043	65.26	4,643	33.51	168	1.21	2	0.01
La Union	197,273	85.11	31,834	13.73	2,479	1.07	205	0.09
Laguna	127,327	31.75	257,366	64.18	14,745	3.68	1,595	0.40
Lanao del Norte	94,619	66.71	46,890	33.06	297	0.21	37	0.03
Lanao del Sur	159,339	74.48	54,226	25.35	356	0.17	17	0.01
Laoag	42,460	96.45	1,342	3.05	208	0.47	13	0.03
Lapu-Lapu City	22,596	51.81	20,887	47.90	122	0.28	4	0.01
Legazpi	15,396	35.58	26,463	61.16	1,350	3.12	58	0.13
Leyte	296,341	67.18	142,647	32.34	2,089	0.47	42	0.01
Lipa	7,620	14.26	41,588	77.85	4,153	7.77	60	0.11
Lucena	14,517	29.45	33,571	68.09	933	1.89	281	0.57
Maguindanao	157,944	68.01	70,162	30.21	3,989	1.72	138	0.06
Makati	102,976	50.98	86,657	42.90	11,430	5.66	939	0.46
Malabon–Navotas–Valenzuela	113,273	45.26	120,308	48.07	15,456	6.18	1,217	0.49
Mandaluyong–San Juan	58,978	36.44	72,956	45.08	28,971	17.90	927	0.57
Mandaue	15,905	27.76	40,989	71.54	380	0.66	23	0.04
Manila	405,086	50.83	322,773	40.50	65,249	8.19	3,904	0.49
Marawi	14,456	53.83	12,255	45.63	114	0.42	32	0.12
Marinduque	26,997	36.36	46,621	62.78	585	0.79	54	0.07
Masbate	66,987	39.37	101,555	59.68	1,582	0.93	31	0.02
Misamis Occidental	50,573	54.51	41,842	45.10	346	0.37	11	0.01
Misamis Oriental	79,101	56.04	61,204	43.36	798	0.57	49	0.03
Mountain Province	9,407	46.07	10,340	50.64	410	2.01	260	1.27
Naga	8,859	21.57	31,876	77.62	299	0.73	34	0.08
Negros del Norte	71,106	56.88	50,289	40.23	3,610	2.89	5	0.00
Negros Occidental	145,019	57.61	101,145	40.18	5,511	2.19	55	0.02
Negros Oriental	113,500	51.16	107,334	48.38	987	0.44	41	0.02
Northern Samar	55,675	49.35	52,448	46.49	4,675	4.14	19	0.02
Nueva Ecija	210,492	59.75	134,169	38.08	7,297	2.07	333	0.09
Nueva Vizcaya	51,352	49.00	52,080	49.70	1,161	1.11	201	0.19
Occidental Mindoro	38,336	48.61	39,730	50.38	723	0.92	69	0.09
Olongapo	47,207	57.74	33,291	40.72	1,140	1.39	125	0.15
Oriental Mindoro	46,270	29.18	110,278	69.55	1,889	1.19	111	0.07
Ormoc	20,616	47.80	22,277	51.65	218	0.51	16	0.04
Oroquieta	8,782	40.44	12,843	59.15	84	0.39	5	0.02
Ozamiz	10,161	29.09	24,571	70.35	176	0.50	18	0.05
Pagadian	14,258	45.83	16,636	53.47	205	0.66	12	0.04
Palawan	36,056	42.89	47,742	56.79	223	0.27	48	0.06
Palayan	6,960	78.97	1,740	19.74	113	1.28	0	0.00
Pampanga	115,287	32.26	209,700	58.68	31,419	8.79	975	0.27
Pangasinan	357,257	56.24	208,983	32.90	68,443	10.77	593	0.09
Parañaque–Las Piñas	82,288	40.79	109,043	54.05	9,592	4.75	830	0.41
Pasay	73,926	48.74	68,968	45.47	8,106	5.34	681	0.45
Pasig–Marikina	101,009	41.20	122,873	50.12	19,946	8.14	1,341	0.55
Puerto Princesa City	15,776	49.91	15,554	49.20	250	0.79	31	0.10
Quezon	88,349	24.61	266,549	74.26	3,880	1.08	148	0.04
Quezon City	290,701	47.04	282,093	45.65	40,914	6.62	4,285	0.69
Quirino	29,114	67.73	13,768	32.03	88	0.20	13	0.03
Rizal	135,976	47.06	137,269	47.50	14,891	5.15	828	0.29
Romblon	27,372	39.39	41,803	60.16	285	0.41	31	0.04
Roxas City	18,134	49.64	17,228	47.16	1,138	3.12	29	0.08
Samar	63,110	54.10	43,484	37.28	10,051	8.62	0	0.00
San Carlos, Negros del Norte	14,690	51.66	13,637	47.96	109	0.38	1	0.00
San Carlos, Pangasinan	16,282	42.14	15,136	39.17	7,223	18.69	0	0.00
San Jose	19,254	58.50	10,692	32.49	2,940	8.93	27	0.08
San Pablo	15,706	24.11	47,457	72.84	1,689	2.59	298	0.46
Silay City	19,311	58.09	13,413	40.35	516	1.55	3	0.01
Siquijor	20,659	60.65	13,375	39.27	27	0.08	2	0.01
Sorsogon	63,305	38.10	95,577	57.52	7,131	4.29	161	0.10
South Cotabato	81,715	39.94	103,449	50.56	18,892	9.23	549	0.27
Southern Leyte	72,620	55.63	57,696	44.20	210	0.16	4	0.00
Sultan Kudarat	52,872	55.59	38,731	40.72	3,368	3.54	136	0.14
Sulu	125,083	77.25	36,651	22.63	179	0.11	17	0.01
Surigao City	13,107	38.50	20,198	59.32	735	2.16	8	0.02
Surigao del Norte	74,454	60.47	48,119	39.08	547	0.44	9	0.01
Surigao del Sur	58,064	42.85	76,957	56.79	389	0.29	99	0.07
Tacloban	32,481	63.65	17,371	34.04	1,154	2.26	24	0.05
Tagaytay	3,472	42.37	4,630	56.50	80	0.98	12	0.15
Tagbilaran	10,782	49.22	10,957	50.02	150	0.68	17	0.08
Taguig–Pateros–Muntinlupa	68,405	43.38	82,191	52.12	6,512	4.13	591	0.37
Tangub	5,122	31.25	11,250	68.64	18	0.11	0	0.00
Tarlac	161,970	57.05	113,906	40.12	7,709	2.72	346	0.12
Tawi-Tawi	59,875	82.47	12,175	16.77	552	0.76	4	0.01
Toledo	14,970	42.63	20,051	57.09	97	0.28	2	0.01
Trece Martires	6,159	83.66	1,202	16.33	0	0.00	1	0.01
Zambales	79,252	59.30	52,395	39.20	1,727	1.29	277	0.21
Zamboanga City	55,638	46.84	60,830	51.21	1,935	1.63	371	0.31
Zamboanga del Norte	91,862	62.71	54,177	36.99	393	0.27	45	0.03
Zamboanga del Sur	133,126	51.32	125,044	48.20	1,166	0.45	77	0.03
Total	10,134,130	50.66	9,173,105	45.85	662,185	3.31	35,974	0.18
Source: Batasang Pambansa

=== NAMFREL tally for president ===
73.78% reporting
Candidate	Party	Votes	%
Corazon Aquino	United Nationalist Democratic Organization	7,909,320	51.74
Ferdinand Marcos (incumbent)	Kilusang Bagong Lipunan	7,376,599	48.26
Total		15,285,919	100.00
Source: United States Senate Committee on Foreign Relations

Popular vote
Aquino	51.74%
Marcos	48.26%

==== By region ====
Region	Aquino		Marcos	
Region	Votes	%	Votes	%
Metro Manila	1,541,725	53.99	1,313,750	46.01
I	346,715	32.57	717,958	67.43
II	106,727	34.49	202,713	65.51
III	858,249	54.40	719,355	45.60
IV	1,157,493	55.08	944,107	44.92
V	652,837	63.88	369,134	36.12
VI	576,809	49.84	580,514	50.16
VII	729,244	56.13	569,900	43.87
VIII	331,951	41.58	466,372	58.42
IX	274,897	50.82	266,076	49.18
X	480,737	50.32	474,623	49.68
XI	609,804	53.55	529,056	46.45
XII	242,132	52.05	223,041	47.95
Total	7,909,320	51.74	7,376,599	48.26
Source: United States Senate Committee on Foreign Relations

==== By province and city ====
Province/City	Aquino		Marcos	
Province/City	Votes	%	Votes	%
Abra	3,065	10.32	26,623	89.68
Agusan del Norte	29,953	42.33	40,816	57.67
Agusan del Sur	29,090	44.96	35,619	55.04
Aklan	36,313	52.86	32,385	47.14
Albay	149,854	69.21	66,674	30.79
Angeles City	50,124	71.50	19,976	28.50
Antique	61,119	55.14	49,717	44.86
Aurora	13,534	47.77	14,797	52.23
Bacolod	66,079	55.26	53,501	44.74
Bago	10,157	39.18	15,769	60.82
Baguio	20,684	37.04	35,151	62.96
Bais	9,118	50.76	8,845	49.24
Basilan	13,231	60.32	8,702	39.68
Bataan	59,944	49.58	60,959	50.42
Batanes	2,141	46.36	2,477	53.64
Batangas	183,946	61.11	117,044	38.89
Batangas City	37,853	64.98	20,403	35.02
Benguet	37,699	53.35	32,970	46.65
Bohol	127,084	48.32	135,901	51.68
Bukidnon	97,044	50.78	94,047	49.22
Bulacan	251,265	56.15	196,191	43.85
Butuan	37,546	54.86	30,892	45.14
Cabanatuan	18,649	41.33	26,478	58.67
Cadiz	563	59.01	391	40.99
Cagayan	17,397	19.84	70,290	80.16
Cagayan de Oro	61,223	56.99	46,198	43.01
Calbayog	8,778	40.48	12,905	59.52
Caloocan	106,866	50.08	106,511	49.92
Camarines Norte	66,266	67.10	32,489	32.90
Camarines Sur	163,744	66.19	83,657	33.81
Camiguin	15,477	58.15	11,140	41.85
Canlaon	3,074	29.55	7,328	70.45
Capiz	29,939	47.82	32,672	52.18
Catanduanes	29,359	50.23	29,092	49.77
Cavite	122,055	43.23	160,297	56.77
Cavite City	12,632	34.06	24,453	65.94
Cebu	205,826	53.20	181,098	46.80
Cebu City	156,383	73.41	56,642	26.59
Cotabato	86,464	55.10	70,468	44.90
Cotabato City	19,021	68.51	8,743	31.49
Dagupan	22,447	52.87	20,011	47.13
Danao	—	—	—	—
Dapitan	9,474	43.43	12,339	56.57
Davao City	139,190	55.98	109,465	44.02
Davao del Norte	124,883	47.11	140,187	52.89
Davao del Sur	62,734	43.59	81,198	56.41
Davao Oriental	63,948	61.14	40,651	38.86
Dipolog	15,638	56.21	12,182	43.79
Dumaguete	21,191	68.70	9,656	31.30
Eastern Samar	49,253	55.20	39,977	44.80
General Santos	35,726	63.83	20,243	36.17
Gingoog	13,176	43.61	17,038	56.39
Ifugao	7,135	55.01	5,835	44.99
Iligan	42,322	64.66	23,127	35.34
Ilocos Norte	271	1.22	21,934	98.78
Ilocos Sur	21,474	14.59	125,686	85.41
Iloilo	189,670	53.09	167,585	46.91
Iloilo City	63,261	53.39	55,237	46.61
Iriga	17,314	66.04	8,904	33.96
Isabela	24,899	31.92	53,116	68.08
Kalinga-Apayao	9,136	38.24	14,758	61.76
La Carlota	5,896	29.74	13,931	70.26
La Union	14,085	13.01	94,190	86.99
Laguna	176,045	54.44	147,359	45.56
Lanao del Norte	29,564	52.90	26,325	47.10
Lanao del Sur	5,338	35.39	9,745	64.61
Laoag	803	3.73	20,707	96.27
Lapu-Lapu City	21,018	50.01	21,011	49.99
Las Piñas	45,531	56.79	34,644	43.21
Legazpi	24,432	60.70	15,819	39.30
Leyte	108,170	33.43	215,433	66.57
Lipa	30,239	60.82	19,479	39.18
Lucena	27,654	59.89	18,521	40.11
Maguindanao	25,588	36.39	44,726	63.61
Makati	53,928	46.15	62,927	53.85
Malabon	52,131	55.10	42,489	44.90
Mandaluyong	54,868	58.22	39,370	41.78
Mandaue	42,946	74.15	14,968	25.85
Manila	389,723	51.04	373,828	48.96
Marawi	7,721	40.05	11,555	59.95
Marikina	70,679	62.66	42,118	37.34
Marinduque	34,152	53.35	29,861	46.65
Masbate	79,769	58.16	57,382	41.84
Misamis Occidental	35,425	46.30	41,094	53.70
Misamis Oriental	53,074	42.19	72,727	57.81
Mountain Province	6,657	58.29	4,763	41.71
Muntinlupa	25,430	59.44	17,355	40.56
Naga	29,363	73.38	10,652	26.62
Navotas	27,506	53.32	24,077	46.68
Negros del Norte	19,097	57.85	13,912	42.15
Negros Occidental	86,202	39.50	132,013	60.50
Negros Oriental	104,017	50.38	102,449	49.62
Northern Samar	43,796	45.46	52,544	54.54
Nueva Ecija	89,192	42.13	122,515	57.87
Nueva Vizcaya	40,917	46.30	47,449	53.70
Occidental Mindoro	26,940	44.30	33,879	55.70
Olongapo	28,737	41.83	39,969	58.17
Oriental Mindoro	65,909	56.54	50,657	43.46
Ormoc	19,883	53.67	17,164	46.33
Oroquieta	12,903	59.82	8,667	40.18
Ozamiz	21,508	64.16	12,016	35.84
Pagadian	16,883	55.77	13,389	44.23
Palawan	21,225	55.91	16,738	44.09
Palayan	799	23.82	2,555	76.18
Pampanga	244,646	68.45	112,737	31.55
Pangasinan	203,492	38.84	320,472	61.16
Parañaque	72,985	61.89	44,950	38.11
Pasay	72,956	48.97	76,037	51.03
Pasig	77,742	59.82	52,223	40.18
Pateros	7,852	59.05	5,446	40.95
Puerto Princesa	12,410	47.75	13,582	52.25
Quezon	183,054	62.93	107,851	37.07
Quezon City	343,780	55.01	281,125	44.99
Quirino	710	51.98	656	48.02
Rizal	152,632	55.61	121,841	44.39
Romblon	18,852	52.27	17,217	47.73
Roxas City	—	—	—	—
Samar	38,367	43.69	49,440	56.31
San Carlos, Negros del Norte	—	—	—	—
San Carlos, Pangasinan	16,038	50.93	15,451	49.07
San Jose	8,586	36.88	14,697	63.12
San Juan	35,662	53.01	31,609	46.99
San Pablo	35,229	58.43	25,068	41.57
Silay	8,513	39.21	13,201	60.79
Siquijor	5,841	36.67	10,086	63.33
Sorsogon	93,775	59.25	64,485	40.75
South Cotabato	110,893	56.97	83,745	43.03
Southern Leyte	45,609	49.27	46,964	50.73
Sultan Kudarat	26,114	47.95	28,352	52.05
Sulu	—	—	—	—
Surigao City	20,583	62.19	12,515	37.81
Surigao del Norte	42,433	47.59	46,724	52.41
Surigao del Sur	72,430	57.49	53,567	42.51
Tacloban	18,095	36.16	31,945	63.84
Tagaytay	3,132	38.23	5,060	61.77
Tagbilaran	13,047	59.81	8,768	40.19
Taguig	40,063	54.42	33,556	45.58
Tangub	11,302	68.78	5,130	31.22
Tarlac	18,430	42.07	25,383	57.93
Tarlac City	41,954	63.34	24,287	36.66
Tawi-Tawi	3,731	34.10	7,209	65.90
Toledo	19,719	60.00	13,148	40.00
Trece Martires	—	—	—	—
Tuguegarao	4,392	35.07	8,132	64.93
Valenzuela	64,023	58.46	45,485	41.54
Zambales	45,923	38.42	73,608	61.58
Zamboanga City	66,112	59.67	44,684	40.33
Zamboanga del Norte	32,982	41.49	46,505	58.51
Zamboanga del Sur	116,776	49.10	121,066	50.90
Total	7,909,320	51.74	7,376,599	48.26
Source: United States Senate Committee on Foreign Relations

=== NAMFREL tally for vice president ===
73.78% reporting
Candidate	Party	Votes	%
Salvador Laurel	United Nationalist Democratic Organization	7,648,570	50.07
Arturo Tolentino	Kilusang Bagong Lipunan	6,978,702	45.69
Eva Estrada Kalaw	Liberal Party (Kalaw wing)	648,097	4.24
Total		15,275,369	100.00
Source: United States Senate Committee on Foreign Relations

Popular vote
Laurel	50.07%
Tolentino	45.69%
Kalaw	4.24%

==== By region ====
Region	Laurel		Tolentino		Kalaw	
Region	Votes	%	Votes	%	Votes	%
Metro Manila	1,297,451	45.31	1,333,817	46.58	232,346	8.11
I	309,654	29.21	668,336	63.05	82,004	7.74
II	110,052	35.82	191,051	62.18	6,143	2.00
III	773,142	49.09	706,737	44.87	95,136	6.04
IV	1,355,665	64.71	681,882	32.55	57,437	2.74
V	659,744	64.36	335,856	32.76	29,499	2.88
VI	565,662	48.86	534,441	46.16	57,674	4.98
VII	700,357	54.03	586,721	45.26	9,194	0.71
VIII	324,602	40.29	461,080	57.23	19,929	2.47
IX	264,449	49.12	269,211	50.00	4,735	0.88
X	477,209	49.85	470,552	49.15	9,619	1.00
XI	579,535	50.99	520,959	45.84	36,025	3.17
XII	231,048	50.51	218,059	47.67	8,356	1.83
Total	7,648,570	50.07	6,978,702	45.69	648,097	4.24
Source: United States Senate Committee on Foreign Relations

==== By province and city ====
Province/City	Laurel		Tolentino		Kalaw	
Province/City	Votes	%	Votes	%	Votes	%
Abra	3,433	11.58	26,084	87.97	133	0.45
Agusan del Norte	29,995	41.69	41,638	57.88	308	0.43
Agusan del Sur	29,988	47.48	32,888	52.07	285	0.45
Aklan	36,014	52.83	30,731	45.08	1,426	2.09
Albay	145,024	65.52	61,450	27.76	14,871	6.72
Angeles City	38,750	55.52	21,001	30.09	10,040	14.39
Antique	68,826	62.30	40,748	36.89	895	0.81
Aurora	13,797	48.98	13,992	49.67	379	1.35
Bacolod	56,155	46.79	52,970	44.14	10,892	9.08
Bago	9,579	37.69	15,227	59.91	611	2.40
Baguio	18,791	33.63	34,454	61.67	2,625	4.70
Bais	9,030	50.16	8,953	49.73	20	0.11
Basilan	12,512	56.31	9,110	41.00	599	2.70
Bataan	56,635	47.09	58,375	48.53	5,266	4.38
Batanes	2,223	47.15	2,475	52.49	17	0.36
Batangas	276,567	91.66	22,867	7.58	2,311	0.77
Batangas City	50,596	90.05	5,171	9.20	421	0.75
Benguet	34,475	49.08	33,984	48.38	1,784	2.54
Bohol	124,013	47.24	137,229	52.27	1,289	0.49
Bukidnon	97,120	50.23	94,180	48.71	2,058	1.06
Bulacan	217,656	48.76	195,782	43.86	32,941	7.38
Butuan	35,030	52.19	31,112	46.35	978	1.46
Cabanatuan	19,033	41.59	25,449	55.61	1,281	2.80
Cadiz	522	55.53	378	40.21	40	4.26
Cagayan	17,805	20.40	69,075	79.13	415	0.48
Cagayan de Oro	57,075	52.72	49,726	45.93	1,464	1.35
Calbayog	8,480	39.36	12,651	58.72	415	1.93
Caloocan	91,746	43.14	107,804	50.69	13,105	6.16
Camarines Norte	67,147	68.26	30,688	31.20	536	0.54
Camarines Sur	173,896	70.50	70,540	28.60	2,217	0.90
Camiguin	15,305	57.59	10,600	39.88	673	2.53
Canlaon	3,084	29.80	7,238	69.93	28	0.27
Capiz	30,896	50.22	30,063	48.87	563	0.92
Catanduanes	28,165	48.95	28,786	50.03	590	1.03
Cavite	128,648	45.86	142,987	50.97	8,883	3.17
Cavite City	12,536	34.46	22,845	62.79	1,000	2.75
Cebu	203,473	52.94	179,150	46.61	1,757	0.46
Cebu City	143,923	67.54	66,647	31.27	2,532	1.19
Cotabato	83,221	54.00	68,085	44.18	2,819	1.83
Cotabato City	16,929	61.33	10,111	36.63	561	2.03
Dagupan	15,544	36.59	17,010	40.04	9,929	23.37
Danao	—	—	—	—	—	—
Dapitan	9,204	42.56	12,363	57.16	60	0.28
Davao City	124,386	49.79	118,482	47.43	6,956	2.78
Davao del Norte	129,206	48.52	134,986	50.69	2,085	0.78
Davao del Sur	62,679	43.81	78,662	54.98	1,737	1.21
Davao Oriental	65,177	62.32	38,685	36.99	726	0.69
Dipolog	14,647	52.98	12,810	46.33	191	0.69
Dumaguete	19,173	60.83	12,027	38.16	319	1.01
Eastern Samar	48,026	54.16	38,052	42.91	2,598	2.93
General Santos	29,964	53.93	19,875	35.77	5,720	10.30
Gingoog	13,279	43.11	16,766	54.43	758	2.46
Ifugao	6,899	56.67	4,687	38.50	588	4.83
Iligan	37,197	56.96	27,552	42.19	558	0.85
Ilocos Norte	467	2.11	21,597	97.60	64	0.29
Ilocos Sur	25,379	17.29	120,795	82.27	651	0.44
Iloilo	183,689	52.82	145,577	41.86	18,487	5.32
Iloilo City	59,153	49.94	51,629	43.59	7,664	6.47
Iriga	17,653	67.68	8,316	31.88	114	0.44
Isabela	26,579	34.41	50,310	65.14	344	0.45
Kalinga-Apayao	8,034	33.87	12,708	53.58	2,978	12.55
La Carlota	6,110	30.48	13,299	66.35	636	3.17
La Union	16,233	15.04	90,462	83.81	1,236	1.15
Laguna	204,033	63.33	105,133	32.63	13,011	4.04
Lanao del Norte	29,056	52.46	26,094	47.12	232	0.42
Lanao del Sur	5,181	35.20	9,520	64.69	16	0.11
Laoag	1,082	4.99	20,126	92.77	487	2.24
Lapu-Lapu City	20,257	48.30	21,305	50.80	378	0.90
Las Piñas	41,252	51.68	34,920	43.75	3,646	4.57
Legazpi	24,373	60.00	14,780	36.39	1,468	3.61
Leyte	107,413	33.00	215,712	66.27	2,381	0.73
Lipa	38,773	77.63	7,321	14.66	3,854	7.72
Lucena	31,567	68.58	13,551	29.44	911	1.98
Maguindanao	26,802	38.95	40,334	58.62	1,672	2.43
Makati	49,314	42.27	61,243	52.49	6,118	5.24
Malabon	44,931	47.81	42,985	45.74	6,069	6.46
Mandaluyong	48,341	51.28	37,356	39.62	8,578	9.10
Mandaue	39,916	71.13	15,672	27.93	529	0.94
Manila	308,381	40.54	387,823	50.99	64,456	8.47
Marawi	8,683	46.04	10,097	53.53	81	0.43
Marikina	55,645	49.40	46,323	41.12	10,684	9.48
Marinduque	39,681	62.21	23,560	36.93	548	0.86
Masbate	79,715	58.77	53,899	39.73	2,033	1.50
Misamis Occidental	35,881	46.64	40,404	52.52	642	0.83
Misamis Oriental	53,608	42.52	71,700	56.87	761	0.60
Mountain Province	6,406	56.68	4,654	41.18	242	2.14
Muntinlupa	24,196	56.58	16,902	39.52	1,670	3.90
Naga	32,027	78.27	8,600	21.02	291	0.71
Navotas	23,272	45.11	24,147	46.81	4,165	8.07
Negros del Norte	17,435	46.63	18,605	49.75	1,354	3.62
Negros Occidental	89,078	39.45	122,154	54.10	14,570	6.45
Negros Oriental	101,565	48.89	104,088	50.10	2,090	1.01
Northern Samar	44,828	46.66	47,302	49.24	3,943	4.10
Nueva Ecija	89,042	42.27	116,791	55.45	4,795	2.28
Nueva Vizcaya	43,483	49.65	42,620	48.66	1,480	1.69
Occidental Mindoro	29,048	48.09	30,751	50.91	604	1.00
Olongapo	28,441	40.87	40,225	57.80	923	1.33
Oriental Mindoro	80,791	69.10	33,859	28.96	2,273	1.94
Ormoc	19,698	44.54	24,142	54.58	390	0.88
Oroquieta	12,826	59.55	8,627	40.05	85	0.39
Ozamiz	23,336	70.30	9,676	29.15	185	0.56
Pagadian	16,337	53.75	13,650	44.91	407	1.34
Palawan	22,227	59.02	15,323	40.69	111	0.29
Palayan	999	29.84	2,318	69.24	31	0.93
Pampanga	209,712	59.02	113,793	32.02	31,824	8.96
Pangasinan	175,357	33.68	286,278	54.99	58,955	11.32
Parañaque	65,784	55.83	46,337	39.33	5,708	4.84
Pasay	69,634	40.86	74,403	43.65	26,398	15.49
Pasig	66,309	51.30	54,064	41.82	8,890	6.88
Pateros	7,064	53.24	5,606	42.25	598	4.51
Puerto Princesa	12,621	48.82	12,998	50.28	234	0.91
Quezon	216,755	74.35	70,570	24.21	4,199	1.44
Quezon City	283,973	45.94	292,797	47.36	41,419	6.70
Quirino	789	57.97	561	41.22	11	0.81
Rizal	129,090	47.24	127,456	46.64	16,737	6.12
Romblon	20,588	57.37	15,192	42.34	105	0.29
Roxas City	—	—	—	—	—	—
Samar	33,030	37.92	45,347	52.06	8,730	10.02
San Carlos, Negros del Norte	—	—	—	—	—	—
San Carlos, Pangasinan	12,487	39.92	12,892	41.22	5,898	18.86
San Jose	7,716	33.15	13,563	58.27	1,997	8.58
San Juan	25,357	37.75	20,852	31.04	20,963	31.21
San Pablo	43,717	72.47	14,838	24.60	1,771	2.94
Silay	8,205	37.64	13,060	59.91	536	2.46
Siquijor	5,832	36.58	10,105	63.38	6	0.04
Sorsogon	91,744	58.10	58,797	37.23	7,379	4.67
South Cotabato	96,970	50.43	76,977	40.03	18,352	9.54
Southern Leyte	46,025	49.72	46,230	49.94	311	0.34
Sultan Kudarat	23,979	44.69	27,266	50.81	2,417	4.50
Sulu	—	—	—	—	—	—
Surigao City	19,540	59.31	12,785	38.81	618	1.88
Surigao del Norte	42,976	48.29	45,228	50.82	784	0.88
Surigao del Sur	71,153	56.97	53,292	42.67	449	0.36
Tacloban	17,102	34.29	31,614	63.38	1,161	2.33
Tagaytay	4,630	56.58	3,468	42.38	85	1.04
Tagbilaran	10,960	50.00	10,813	49.33	148	0.68
Taguig	37,190	50.69	32,711	44.58	3,470	4.73
Tangub	11,250	68.21	5,222	31.66	20	0.12
Tarlac	17,565	40.22	24,282	55.60	1,826	4.18
Tarlac City	39,390	59.57	23,987	36.28	2,745	4.15
Tawi-Tawi	3,860	35.52	6,936	63.82	72	0.66
Toledo	19,131	58.46	13,494	41.24	98	0.30
Trece Martires	—	—	—	—	—	—
Tuguegarao	4,240	32.21	8,615	65.44	310	2.35
Valenzuela	55,062	50.51	47,544	43.61	6,410	5.88
Zambales	48,203	39.86	71,271	58.93	1,467	1.21
Zamboanga City	57,002	51.19	52,537	47.18	1,825	1.64
Zamboanga del Norte	32,961	42.03	45,256	57.71	202	0.26
Zamboanga del Sur	117,926	50.00	116,549	49.42	1,379	0.58
Total	7,648,570	50.07	6,978,702	45.69	648,097	4.24
Source: United States Senate Committee on Foreign Relations

== Aftermath and legacy ==
The conduct of the election led to popular belief that the polls were tampered with and the results were fraudulent. The following days consisted of debates and actions as a sign of aversion to the conduct of the election. But in the end, international observers declared that the "election of February 7 was not conducted in a free and fair manner" due to the influence and power of the Marcos administration. The International Observer Delegation stated that Marcos's proclamation of victory was invalid because the Batasan "ignored explicit provisions of the Philippine Electoral Code requiring that the tampered or altered election returns be set aside during the final counting process, despite protests by representatives of the opposition party." After further investigation, a multinational team of observers cited cases of vote-buying, intimidation, snatching of ballot boxes, tampered election returns and the disenfranchisement of thousands of voters.

On February 9, thirty-five computer programmers walked out of the COMELEC's electronic quick count at the Philippine International Convention Center, some fearing for their safety and seeking sanctuary in Baclaran Church. The technicians—whose protest was broadcast live on national television—claimed that the Marcos camp had manipulated the election results.

Cardinal Ricardo Vidal, president of the Catholic Bishops' Conference of the Philippines, declared, "If a government does not of itself freely correct the evil it has inflicted on the people, then it is our serious moral obligation as a people to make it do so." The declaration called on "every loyal member of the Church, every community of the faithful, to form their judgment about the February 7 polls," and "[n]ow is the time to speak up. Now is the time to repair the wrong. The wrong was systematically organized. So must its correction be. But as in the election itself, that depends fully on the people; on what they are willing and ready to do." The United States Senate passed a resolution stating the same. Opposition from the Church and the United States eventually led to the resignation of defense minister Juan Ponce Enrile and Armed Forces vice chief of staff Fidel V. Ramos, who secluded themselves in the military and police headquarters of Camp Aguinaldo and Camp Crame, respectively. In response, the People Power Revolution was held from February 22 to 25, 1986, which toppled the Marcos dictatorship.

Aquino was praised in the American press:

The courage and the essential goodness of Corazón Aquino was so impressive in her battle against enormous odds. And the bravery of her followers— many of whom were killed as they pursued their belief in a true democracy... And then there was this: the role of the press, print and electronic. Through television cameras and newspapers, the whole world was watching. President Marcos could lie and cheat, but in the end he could not hide.

— Tom Brokaw, NBC Nightly News

Although Marcos died in exile in 1989, many of his supporters remained powerful in government and society. Fidel Ramos was elected to succeed Aquino as president in 1992. The Marcos family have gone to great lengths to reestablish his reputation in the Philippines, including through a campaign of historical revision. As of 2026, his son Bongbong Marcos is president of the Philippines, having won the 2022 presidential election in a landslide.

=== Monument of Heroes ===
A number of individuals who were killed in an effort to protect the integrity of the 1986 Philippine presidential election have been formally honored as "heroes" at the Philippines' Bantayog ng mga Bayani (lit. 'Monument of Heroes'). These include Jeremias de Jesus, Evelio Javier, Francisco Laurella, Salvador Leaño, Fernando Pastor Sr., and Michael Sumilang.

=== In media ===
The snap elections and their aftermath are dramatized in the 1988 film A Dangerous Life.

== See also ==
- Commission on Elections
- Politics of the Philippines
- Philippine elections
- President of the Philippines
- 2024 Venezuelan presidential election
