= Military career of Ferdinand Marcos =

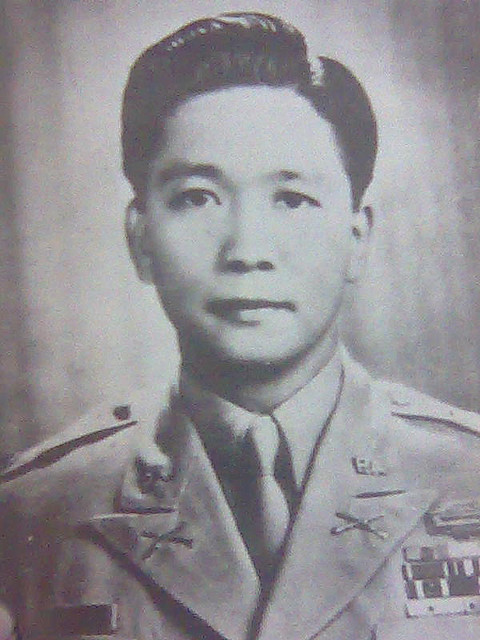
Post-war photo of Ferdinand E. Marcos

The military career of Ferdinand Marcos during World War II remains the subject of controversy. Marcos received ROTC training while studying at the University of the Philippines. He was activated for service in the US Armed Forces in the Philippines after the attack on Pearl Harbor. He served as a 3rd lieutenant during the mobilization in the summer and fall of 1941, continuing until April 1942, when he was taken prisoner. Marcos claimed that he was released from prison on August 4, 1942. US military records show that he rejoined USAFIP forces in December 1944. Marcos's military service formally ended with his discharge as a major in the 14th Infantry in May 1945.

Controversies regarding Marcos's military service revolve around: the reason for his release from the Japanese POW camp; his actions between his release and return to service; his final rank; and his claims to numerous military decorations.

Documents uncovered in 1986 suggested that Marcos's release in August 1942 was because his father, former congressman and provincial governor Mariano Marcos, "cooperated with the Japanese military authorities" as publicist.

Marcos claims that he spent much of the period between his release and 1944 return leading a guerilla organization called Ang Manga Mahárlika (Tagalog, "The Freeman") in Northern Luzon. According to Marcos, this force had a strength of 9,000 men. His account was cast into doubt by a United States military investigation exposed many of his claims as false/inaccurate.

Another controversy arose in 1947, when Marcos began signing communications as a lieutenant colonel, instead of major. US officials noted that Marcos was "a major in the roster of the 14th Infantry USAFIP, NL as of 12 December 1944 to his date of discharge".

The biggest controversy, however, concerned his claims during the 1962 Senatorial Campaign that he was the "most decorated war hero of the Philippines." He claimed to have received 33 war medals/decorations, including the Distinguished Service Cross and the Medal of Honor. However, researchers later reported that stories about his wartime exploits were mostly false of inaccurate. Only two of the claimed awards - the Gold Cross and the Distinguished Service Star - were given during the war, and both had been contested by Marcos's superiors.

== Training and mobilization ==
Before World War II, Marcos was already a Reserve Officers' Training Corps graduate during his time studying law. Hours after the attack on Pearl Harbor on December 8, 1941, the Japanese simultaneously bombed many places in the Philippines, including Clark Field. The 14th Army began its invasion with a landing on Batan Island (not to be confused with Bataan Peninsula), 120 miles (190 km) off the north coast of Luzon on the same day, by selected naval infantry units. Landings on Camiguin Island and at Vigan, Aparri, and Gonzaga in northern Luzon followed two days later.

Marcos was one of those who were called into the army as a 3rd lieutenant during the mobilization in the summer and fall of 1941. The U.S. Army has confirmed that Ferdinand Marcos fought on the U.S. side after the December 1941 Japanese invasion of the Philippines until April 1942, after which he was taken prisoner.

== Battle of Bataan ==
Records show that Ferdinand Marcos was assigned to the G-2 (Intelligence) of Gen. Mateo Capinpin's 21st Infantry Division in Bataan. Being assigned to the HQ Company, the claim for his accounts in single-handedly stopping the advance of the Japanese on April 2 is under question. Records and reports made during the battle on April 2 have no mention of 3Lt. Marcos holding back the Japanese assault. No record also exist of 3Lt. Marcos being given command of a front line units, and this was also corroborated by officers of the 21st Division.

Marcos's direct commanding officer in G-2 of the 21st Division, Maj. Romulo Manriquez, denied any knowledge of Marcos's exploits. Controversially, in 1982, Marcos would gift Manriquez gold-plated his and hers Cartier watch.

While Marcos appears at the end of the war wearing a DSC and two Silver Stars, his name does not appear in the two lists of 120 American and Filipinos who were awarded the DSCs as radioed by Gen. Jonathan Wainwright to Washington before his surrender. Marcos also does not appear in "List of Recipients of Awards and Decorations Issued Between Dec. 7, 1941 through June 30, 1945" as compiled by the staff of Gen. Douglas MacArthur in Tokyo.

Louis Morton who authored the official Army Records "Fall of the Philippines" also relied on the publication of "A Brief History of the 21st Division," which forms the account of Gen. Mateo M. Capinpin's command. Marcos was mentioned in the dispatches, and tells of one incident where Marcos was instructed to bring a wounded officer to the rear. The 21st Infantry Division's historical account also list officers and enlisted men who received awards, but there was no mention of Marcos receiving the DSC and Silver Stars. It was also noted that the 21st Infantry Division, despite their critical role in the Guagua-Porac Line and in Bataan did not receive sufficient recognition for their deeds.

== Bataan Death March and release from Japanese prison ==
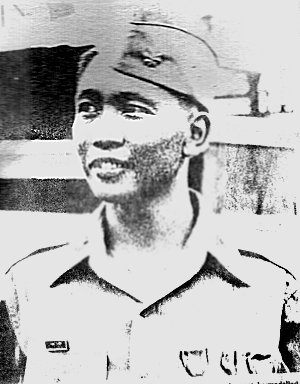
Ferdinand Marcos during WW2

Marcos was allegedly one of the 78,000 Filipino and American troops who surrendered at Bataan on April 9, 1942, four months after the Japanese initiated their invasion of the Philippines. He survived the Bataan Death March that followed the surrender.

According to Marcos's account, he was freed from the Japanese POW camp on August 4, 1942.

This later became controversial when the Japanese government confirmed that Philippine prisoners released at the time were either those who had "severe health problems", or those "whose families have cooperated with the Japanese military authorities." Lists of ailing prisoners released by the Manila press in the summer of 1942 did not include Ferdinand Marcos's name, and journalists later discovered documents stating that Ferdinand's father Mariano Marcos had been a propagandist working for the Japanese during the war, and had been "executed by anti-Japanese guerrillas" in 1945.

John Sharkey of The Washington Post found records that Marcos was in the list of those that were released due to either "having severe health problems and those whose families have cooperated with the Japanese military authorities." Since Marcos's name did not appear in the 1942 Manila Tribune list of ailing prisoners that were released by the Japanese, Sharkey believed that Marcos may have been freed due to his connections with his father.

== Claims of guerrilla force leadership ==
After the fall of Bataan, Marcos claimed to have led a guerrilla force called Ang Mahárlika (Tagalog, "The Freeman") in northern Luzon during World War II. According to Marcos's claim, this force had a strength of 9,000 men.

His account of events was later cast into doubt after a United States military investigation exposed many of his claims as either false or inaccurate. Meanwhile, Marcos claimed that he was able to get the United States Adjutant General to recognize 3,500 individual claims of soldiers then under his command. Initial investigations by the US Army, and subsequent ones in 1948 after Marcos requested for reparations and backpay has been concluded by investigators as fraudulent and a malicious criminal act. These records have been declassified by the Philippine Veterans Affairs Office and the US National Archives and Records Administration.

According to Marcos publicist-turned critic Primitivo Mijares in his book The Conjugal Dictatorship, Marcos also filed a fake multimillion-dollar war reparations claim that he had supplied starving American and Filipino soldiers with several thousand head of cattle.

Further research uncovered from US military records that Marcos and his family collaborated with the Japanese authorities. The younger Marcos then was recorded by a Japanese official as one of their propagandists. The father, Mariano Marcos, was later executed by Filipino guerillas in their own province through quartering by tying him to four water buffalos who ran in opposite directions. What was left of him was hung from a tree. American guerilla Robert Lapham recounted that Mariano Marcos "was unquestionably a collaborator with the Japanese, for which bad judgment he paid a ghastly price." The guerillas who carried out the execution of Mariano Marcos were friends and relatives of the Julio Nalundasan, the former's political enemy who was murdered by Ferdinand Marcos in 1935 after losing twice against the latter during the local elections.

== Return to USAFIP and discharge from service ==
According to US Military records, Marcos rejoined USAFIP forces in December 1944. Marcos's Military service then formally ended with his discharge as a Major in the 14th Infantry, US Armed Forces in the Philippines Northern Luzon, in May 1945.

In communications starting around the end of 1947, Marcos began signing communications with the rank of Lt. Col., instead of Major. This prompted US officials to note that Marcos "is recognized as a major in the roster of the 14th Infantry USAFIP, NL as of 12 December 1944 to his date of discharge."

== Medals controversy ==
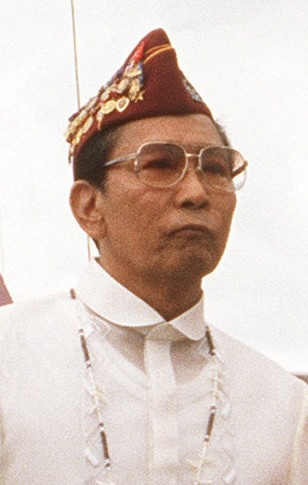
Marcos displaying controversial medal haul on his veteran garrison cap

In 1962, Marcos would claim to be the "most decorated war hero of the Philippines" by garnering almost every medal and decoration that the Filipino and American governments could give to a soldier. Among his supposed 27 war medals and decorations were the Distinguished Service Cross (allegedly pinned by General Douglas MacArthur) and the Medal of Honor (allegedly pinned by General Jonathan M. Wainwright).

These following claims have been discredited:

- Marcos was listed in General Douglas MacArthur's "List of Recipients of Awards and Decorations" issued from December 7, 1941, to June 30, 1945, that was compiled in Tokyo, and General Jonathan Wainwright's list of 120 Americans and Filipinos who were awarded during the Bataan campaign by the War Department shortly before his surrender.
- Colonel Manriquez and Adjutant Captain Rivera who were the commanders of the 14th Infantry, whom Marcos claimed to have served under, attested that Marcos was not a soldier, but was a non-combatant and a Civil Affairs officer. Marcos only received campaign ribbons given to all combatant and non-combatant participants "in the defense of Bataan and in the resistance."
- Marcos's claim of having received the Order of the Purple Heart has also been shown to have been false. His name does not appear on the official roster of recipients.

Researchers later found that stories about the wartime exploits of Marcos were mostly propaganda, being inaccurate or untrue.

In 1986, research by historian Alfred W. McCoy into United States Army records showed most of Marcos's medals to be fraudulent. According to Dr. Ricardo T. Jose, former chairman of the Department of History of the University of the Philippines, Marcos's claims in his self-commissioned autobiography Marcos of the Philippines that Gen. Douglas MacArthur pinned on him the Distinguished Service Cross medal for delaying Japanese at Bataan for 3 months was highly improbable.

== See also ==
- Ferdinand Marcos
- First term of Ferdinand Marcos as President of the Philippines
