= Arturo Tolentino =

Filipino politician (1910–2004)

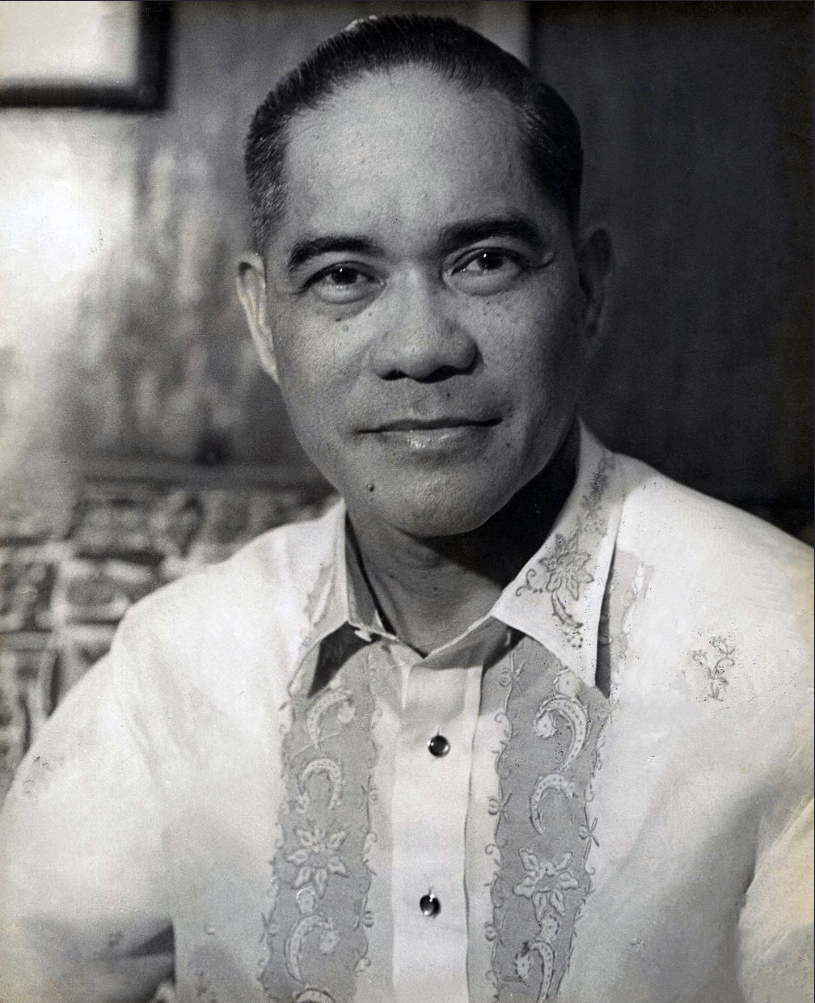

12th President of the Senate of the Philippines
- In office January 17, 1966 – January 26, 1967
- Preceded by: Ferdinand Marcos
- Succeeded by: Gil Puyat

Minister of Foreign Affairs
- In office June 30, 1984 – March 4, 1985
- President: Ferdinand Marcos
- Prime Minister: Cesar Virata
- Preceded by: Manuel Collantes (acting)
- Succeeded by: Pacifico Castro (acting)

Senate Majority Leader
- In office January 26, 1970 – September 23, 1972
- Preceded by: Rodolfo Ganzon
- Succeeded by: Position abolished (Next held by Orly Mercado)
- In office January 22, 1962 – January 17, 1966
- Preceded by: Cipriano Primicias Sr.
- Succeeded by: Jose Roy

Senator of the Philippines
- In office June 30, 1992 – June 30, 1995
- In office December 30, 1957 – September 23, 1972

House Majority Leader
- In office January 25, 1954 – December 30, 1957
- Preceded by: Raul Leuterio
- Succeeded by: Jose Aldeguer

Member of the Regular Batasang Pambansa
- In office June 30, 1984 – February 16, 1986
- Constituency: Manila

Member of the Interim Batasang Pambansa
- In office June 12, 1978 – June 5, 1984
- Constituency: Region IV

Member of the House of Representatives from Manila's 3rd district
- In office December 30, 1949 – December 30, 1957
- Preceded by: District established
- Succeeded by: Ramon Bagatsing

Personal details
- Born: Arturo Modesto Tolentino; September 19, 1910 Tondo, Manila, Philippine Islands
- Died: August 2, 2004 (aged 93) Quezon City, Philippines
- Resting place: Libingan ng mga Bayani, Taguig, Philippines
- Party: NPC (1992–2004)
- Other political affiliations: KBL (1978–1992); Nacionalista (1949–1978); Young Philippines (until 1949)
- Spouses: Consuelo David; Pilar Adorable; Constancia Conde
- Children: 7
- Education: University of the Philippines Manila (AA, BPhil); University of the Philippines Diliman (LL.B); University of Santo Tomas (LL.M, DCL)

Arturo "Ka Turing" Modesto Tolentino (September 19, 1910 – August 2, 2004) was a Filipino politician, lawyer, and diplomat who served as the Senate president and the Secretary of Foreign Affairs. He was the vice-presidential running mate of Ferdinand Marcos in the 1986 Philippine election, which led to the ouster of Marcos in the People Power Revolution.

Tolentino helped write the Civil Code of the Philippines from 1948 to 1949 and authored the Anti-Graft and Corrupt Practices Act of 1960.

== Early career ==
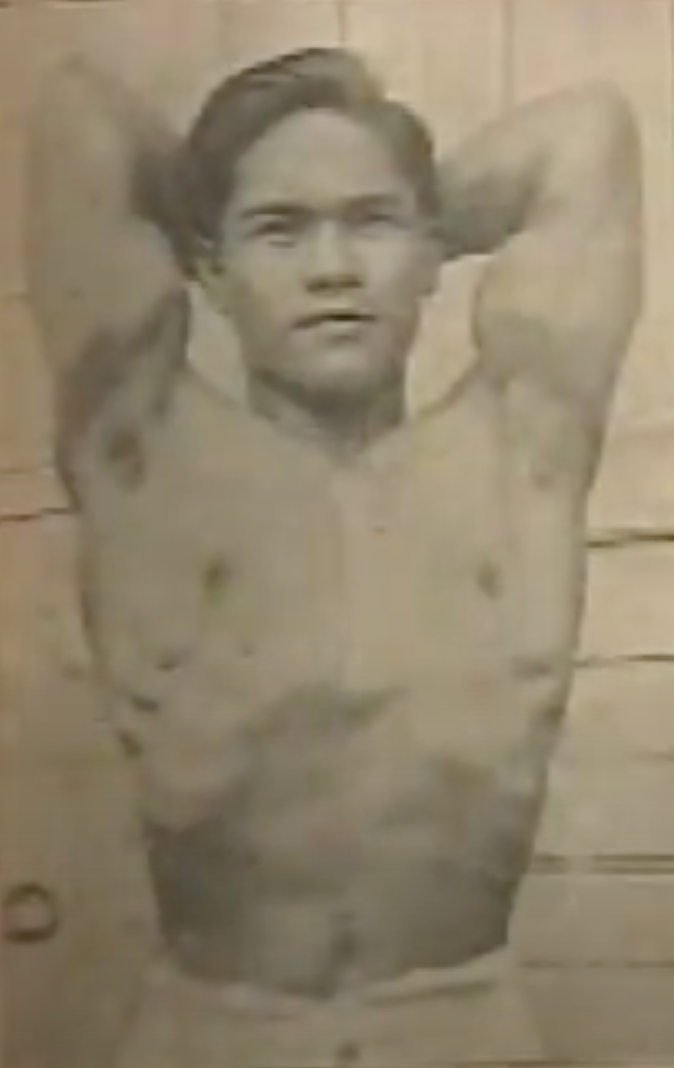
Tolentino during his time as a wrestler in 1934

Arturo Modesto Tolentino was born in Manila. At UP Manila, he obtained an Associate in Arts as well as the Bachelor of Philosophy. He won a gold medal award as valedictorian at UP in 1938, and was valedictorian of the UP College of Law (1934). He later continued his studies and received the degrees of Master of Law and Doctor of Civil Law from the University of Santo Tomas. He was also a short story writer for the Philippines Free Press, and was a wrestler and bodybuilder.

As a debater and orator, he won seven gold medals (including the Quezon Medal) and two silver cups. He won the title of "Inter-Collegiate Oratorical Champion of the Philippines" in 1934. He successfully debated with American students from the University of Oregon in 1933 and from the University of Washington in 1934. In 1934, Tolentino was also the consort to the Miss Manila winner at the Manila Carnival. In UP, he was editor-in-chief of the Philippine Collegian and a fellow of the Upsilon Sigma Phi fraternity. Tolentino began practicing law after passing the bar in 1934.

== Early political career ==
=== House of Representatives (1949–1957) ===
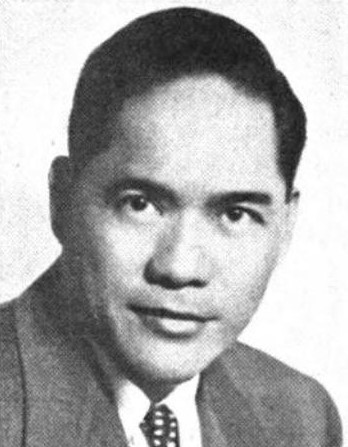
Tolentino official portrait during the 3rd Congress.

Tolentino was already a noted scholar and trial lawyer when he was selected in 1948 by President Manuel Roxas to be the youngest member of the Code Committee that would draft the first and only Civil Code of the Philippines, which was completed in late 1949 and took effect in 1950. Tolentino was first elected as representative for Manila's 3rd district in 1949; he was the first representative of the district following its establishment that year through the revised Manila city charter. He was re-elected in 1953. Shortly after his re-election, Tolentino was given the position of majority floor leader, which he held until his entry to the Senate four years later and one which, though less glamorous than that of speaker, he preferred and enjoyed.

=== Senate (1957–1972) ===
Tolentino was elected in the Senate in the 1957 election. He was re-elected in 1963 and in 1969. In 1966, shortly after Ferdinand Marcos was elected president, Tolentino was elected Senate president. A year later, however, he was ousted from his position.

== Vice presidential candidate (1986) ==
Tolentino, a vocal critic of President Marcos within the Kilusang Bagong Lipunan (KBL), was chosen by Marcos in late 1985 to be his vice-presidential running mate for the 1986 snap election. They were against the united opposition of Corazon Aquino and Salvador Laurel. Many KBL members were not pleased with Tolentino being chosen as Marcos' running mate, but ultimately backed Marcos' decision out of loyalty. In response to criticism of his perceived "new stance", Tolentino claimed that he would remain a critic of the Marcos administration when elected, intending to provide criticisms that will be more "constructive".

According to the National Movement for Free Elections (NAMFREL) final tally, Aquino and Laurel were consistently in the lead. The final tally showed Laurel winning by over 800,000 votes—roughly the same margin by which it showed Aquino defeating Marcos. However, according to the official COMELEC tally, Tolentino won over Laurel with a margin of approximately one million votes. He was ceremonially sworn in as Vice President of the Philippines on February 16, 1986, but functionally never took office. The disputed outcome would eventually lead to the People Power Revolution which ousted Marcos and installed Aquino as a revolutionary president. In 2013, the National Historical Commission of the Philippines in its Resolution No. 2, series of 2013, officially stated that Tolentino was not elected as vice-president, consequently excluding him from the official roster of vice-presidents of the Philippines.

== 1986 coup attempt ==
After the People Power Revolution, Tolentino launched a failed coup attempt on July 6, 1986. He claimed that, since Marcos was in exile, he was constitutionally the acting president of the Philippines. Marcos allies and about 100 soldiers marched to the luxurious Manila Hotel, occupied it, and established a government. He expected massive support, but only several thousand of Marcos loyalists supported his cause, which dwindled to several hundred. On July 8, he agreed to surrender.

== Later life ==
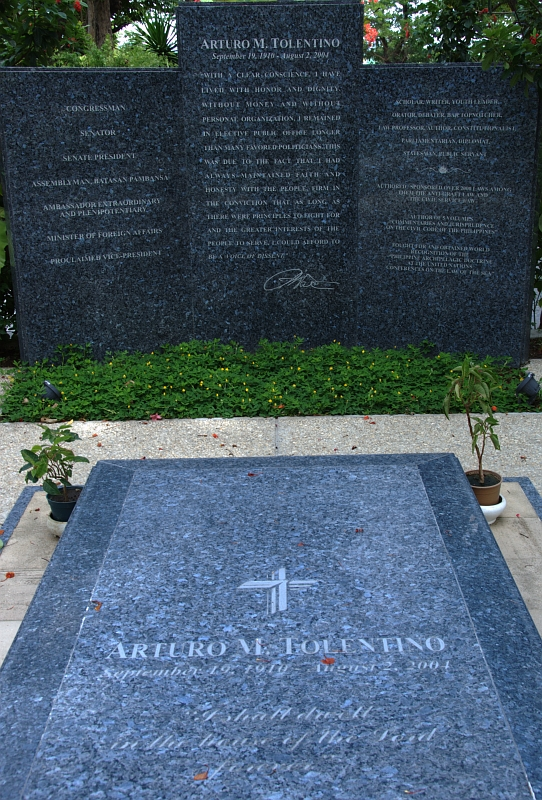
Tolentino's tomb at the Libingan ng mga Bayani.

=== Return to the Senate (1992–1995) ===
In 1992, Tolentino successfully ran for the Senate, placing 18th as part of the Nationalist People's Coalition. However, his bid for re-election in 1995 was not successful, and he retired from politics. During this time he still took part in notable landmark cases including Tolentino v. Sec. of Finance.

=== Death and legacy ===
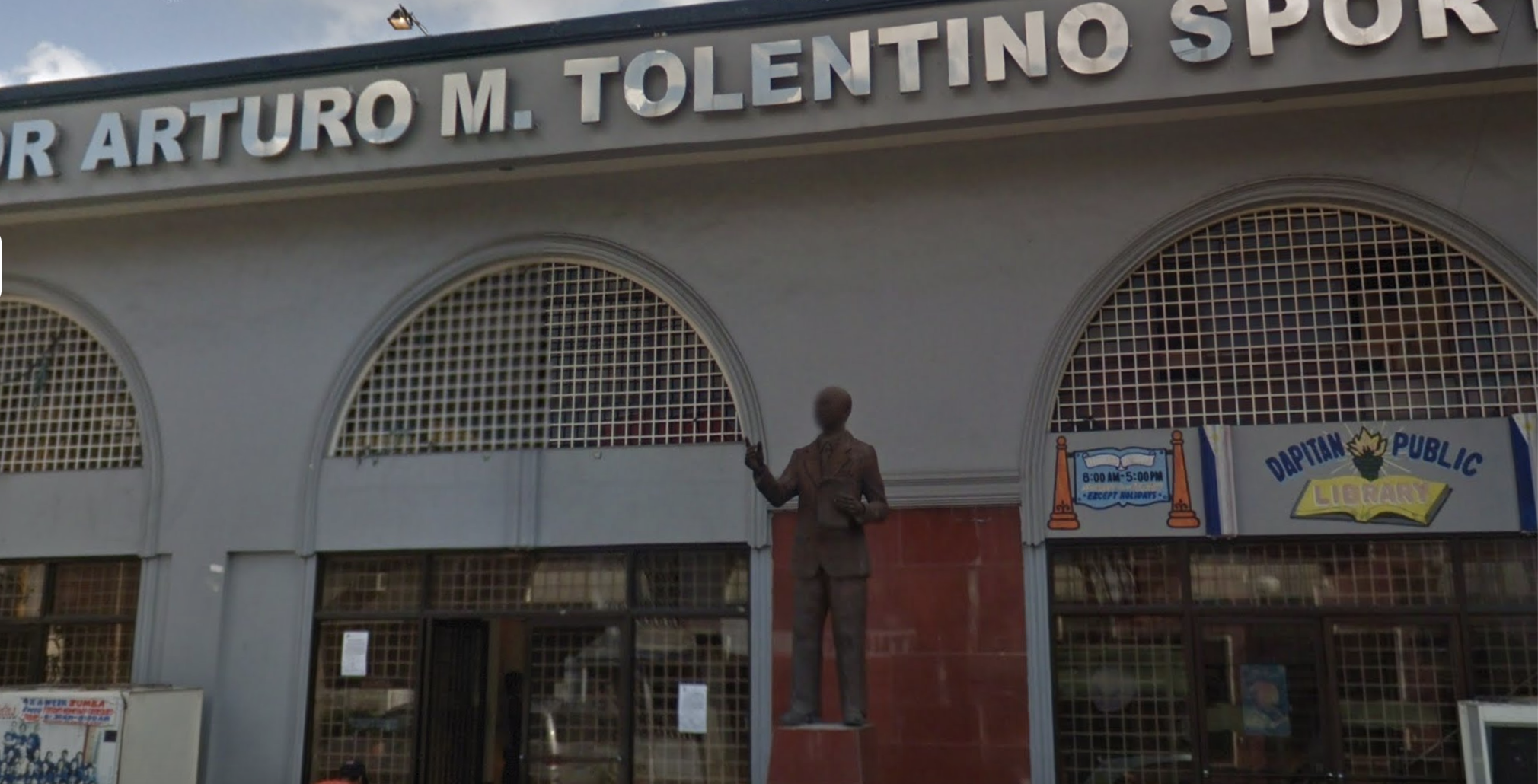
Statue of Tolentino and the sports center named in his honor in Sampaloc, Manila.

Tolentino died of a heart attack on the night of August 2, 2004, at the age of 93. He is buried at the Libingan ng mga Bayani.

Tolentino was once the foremost expert in civil law and persons throughout the 1960s to 1980s. The civil law volumes mainly used in the UP College of Law and other law universities are still Tolentino's Commentaries and Jurisprudence on the Civil Code of the Philippines, which were published beginning circa 1960.

Sampaloc, Manila has a sports center named after the late senator and has a public monument of Tolentino along Instruccion Street.

== Personal life ==
Tolentino first married his childhood sweetheart, Consuelo David. Tolentino and David had three children, Arturo Jr., Evelyn, and Annabella. However, their marriage ended in divorce during the Japanese occupation. He then married Pilar Adorable, who was tragically killed during the American bombings of Intramuros. Tolentino later took socialite Constancia Conde as his last wife. Tolentino and Conde had three children, Bernadette, Salvador, and Victorio. Tolentino also had a non-marital child, Ma. Elenita, with Rosita Robles.

== Electoral history ==
Electoral history of Arturo Tolentino
| Year | Office | Party | Votes received | | | | Result |
| Year | Office | Party | Total | % | P. | Swing | Result |
|---|---|---|---|---|---|---|---|
| 1949 | Representative (Manila–3rd) | Nacionalista | —N/a | —N/a | 1st | —N/a | Won |
| 1953 | Representative (Manila–3rd) | Nacionalista | 44,294 | 72.44% | 1st | —N/a | Won |
| 1957 | Senator of the Philippines | Nacionalista | 1,982,708 | 38.81% | 2nd | —N/a | Won |
| 1963 | Senator of the Philippines | Nacionalista | 3,570,619 | 46.30% | 2nd | +7.49 | Won |
| 1969 | Senator of the Philippines | Nacionalista | 4,826,809 | 58.84% | 1st | +12.54 | Won |
| 1992 | Senator of the Philippines | NPC | 4,929,625 | 20.32% | 18th | −38.52 | Won |
| 1995 | Senator of the Philippines | NPC | 7,726,006 | 30.02% | 17th | +9.70 | Lost |
| 1978 | Assemblyman (Region IV) | KBL | 1,757,636 | 3.17% | 3rd | —N/a | Won |
| 1984 | Assemblyman (Manila) | KBL | 422,986 | 8.98% | 4th | —N/a | Won |
| 1986 | Vice President of the Philippines | KBL | 6,978,702 | 45.69% | 2nd | —N/a | Lost |

House of Representatives of the Philippines
| New district | Representative, 3rd District of Manila; 1949–1957 | Succeeded by Ramon Bagatsing |
Senate of the Philippines
| Preceded by Cipriano Primicias Sr. | Senate Majority Floor Leader; 1962–1965 | Succeeded by Jose Roy |
| Preceded by Ferdinand Marcos | President of the Senate of the Philippines; 1966–1967 | Succeeded by Gil Puyat |
| Preceded by Rodolfo Ganzon | Senate Majority Floor Leader; 1970–1972 | Vacant Senate shut down Title next held by Orlando S. Mercado |
Political offices
| Preceded by Manuel Collantes; Acting | Minister of Foreign Affairs; 1984–1985 | Succeeded by Pacifico Castro; Acting |
Party political offices
| First | KBL nominee for Vice President of the Philippines; 1986 | Succeeded by Vicente Magsaysay |
