= Negros del Norte =

Former province of the Philippines

Province of Negros del Norte
- Former province of the Philippines
- 1986
- Location of the short-lived province of Negros del Norte
- Capital: Cadiz
- Area
  - Coordinates: 10°57′N 123°18′E
  - 1980: 2,866.33 km^{2} (1,106.70 sq mi)
- Population
  - 1980: 738,273
- Government
- Governor
  - January 3, 1986-April 4, 1986: Armando Gustilo
  - April 5, 1986-August 18, 1986: Jose Puey, Jr.
- History
  - Established: 3 January 1986
  - Disestablished: 18 August 1986
Preceded by	Succeeded by
Negros Occidental	Negros Occidental
- Today part of: Negros Occidental

Negros del Norte was a province of the Philippines, located within the Western Visayas region. It existed in 1986 and was abolished later the same year. The law establishing the province was nullified by the Supreme Court of the Philippines on August 19, 1986.

== History ==
Negros del Norte was established under Batas Pambansa Blg. 885 which provided for the creation of the new province comprising the cities of Cadiz (the capital), San Carlos and Silay, and the municipalities of Calatrava, Enrique B. Magalona (Saravia), Escalante, Manapla, Sagay, Salvador Benedicto, Toboso and Victorias. The creation of the new province was ratified on January 3, 1986, via a plebiscite. The results are:

1986 Negros del Norte creation plebiscite
Choice	Votes	%
For	164,734	84.42
Against	30,400	15.58
Total	195,134	100.00
Source: Proclamation No. 2473

President Ferdinand Marcos declared the creation of Negros del Norte on January 7, 1986.

The creation of this new province was, however, opposed by the Negros Anti-Partition Movement and, on July 11, 1986, the Supreme Court declared the creation of the province of Negros del Norte unconstitutional. The ruling stated that the enabling law was unconstitutional for, among other things, not including the rest of Negros Occidental in the plebiscite, and the proposed province not meeting the 3,500 square kilometre land area requirement of the 1983 Local Government Code.

It has been proposed that other municipalities should join the proposed province to fulfill the needed 3,500 square kilometre land area requirement before a plebiscite can take place.

== Administrative divisions ==
Negros del Norte was composed of eight municipalities and three cities:

=== Cities ===
- Cadiz (capital)
- San Carlos
- Silay

=== Municipalities ===
- Calatrava
- Enrique B. Magalona (Saravia)
- Escalante
- Manapla
- Sagay
- Salvador Benedicto
- Toboso
- Victorias

== See also ==
- Negros Occidental
