= N1 highway (Philippines) =

Highway in the Philippines

Route 1

Route information
- Part of AH26
- Maintained by the Department of Public Works and Highways
- Length: 3,858 km (2,397 mi) Excluding 19 km (12 mi) gap in Metro Manila
- Existed: 2014–present

Luzon (Laoag–Pasay)
- Length: 1,410 km (880 mi)
- North end: N2 / N100 in Laoag
- Major intersections: N101 / N119 in Lal-lo; N51 / N106 in Tuguegarao; N53 in Cauayan; N51 in Santiago; N56 in San Jose; N58 in Santa Rosa; N3 in Gapan; AH 26 (E1) / E1 in Santa Rita, Guiguinto; E1 / N2 in Tabang, Guiguinto; E5 in Karuhatan, Valenzuela; N150 / AH 26 (N120) in Caloocan; N160 / AH 26 (E1) in Quezon City; N59 / N180 in Quezon City; N60 / N184 in Quezon City and Mandaluyong; N145 / AH 26 (E2) in Makati
- South end: AH 26 (N120) / N61 in Pasay

Luzon (Muntinlupa–Matnog)
- Length: 784 km (487 mi)
- North end: N411 / N142 in Alabang, Muntinlupa
- Major intersections: N65 in Biñan; N66 in Calamba; AH 26 (E2) / E2 in Calamba; E2 in Santo Tomas; N4 / N421-2 in Santo Tomas; N67 in San Pablo; N68 in Santa Elena; N68 in Sipocot
- South end: Port of Matnog

Eastern Visayas
- Length: 397 km (247 mi)
- North end: N670 in Allen
- Major intersections: AH 26 (N70) in Palo; N70 in Mahaplag
- South end: N691 in Liloan

Mindanao
- Length: 1,074.5 km (667.7 mi)
- North end: Port of Lipata in Surigao City
- Major intersections: N9 in Butuan; N73 in Trento; N74 / N909 in Tagum; AH 26 (N916-5) in Davao City; AH 26 (N10) in Davao City; N75 in Digos; N76 in Isulan; N75 in Sultan Kudarat; N77 in Malabang; N78 in Labangan; N79 in Ipil
- South end: N966 / N970 / N971 in Zamboanga City

Location
- Country: Philippines
- Provinces: Ilocos Norte, Cagayan, Isabela, Nueva Vizcaya, Nueva Ecija, Bulacan, Laguna, Batangas, Quezon, Camarines Norte, Camarines Sur, Albay, Sorsogon, Northern Samar, Samar, Eastern Samar, Leyte, Southern Leyte, Surigao del Norte, Agusan del Norte, Agusan del Sur, Davao de Oro, Davao del Norte, Davao del Sur, Sarangani, South Cotabato, Maguindanao del Sur, Maguindanao del Norte, Lanao del Sur, Lanao del Norte, Zamboanga del Sur, Zamboanga Sibugay

Highway system
- Roads in the Philippines; Highways; Expressways; List
← AH 26 (26)	→ N2

National Route 1 (N1) is a primary national route that forms part of the Philippine highway network, running from Luzon to Mindanao. Except for a 19-kilometer (12 mi) gap in Metro Manila and ferry connections, the highway is generally continuous. Most sections of N1 forms the Pan-Philippine Highway except for sections bypassed by expressways.

== Route description ==
N1 follows a route that runs from Laoag in Ilocos Norte to Zamboanga City via Bicol Region, Eastern Visayas and eastern and southern parts of Mindanao. The highway connects most major regional centers on its route and runs through different landscapes. The highway is mostly named Maharlika Highway or National Highway, but other sections use different names, including alternative names assumed within some poblacions (city or town proper).

=== Ilocos Region ===
N1 begins at the intersection with N2 (Manila North Road) and N100 (Laoag Airport Road) in Laoag as Manila North Road (MaNor). It then crosses Padsan River via Gilbert Bridge and enters the city proper of Laoag, where it splits before turning to the east in front of Ilocos Norte Provincial Capitol, where the Pan-Philippine Highway commences. It then briefly follows J.P. Rizal Avenue before turning to General Segundo Avenue; both are principal city streets passing through the city proper and through its outskirts. Approaching Bacarra, it becomes a rural highway. At Bacarra, it bypasses the town center to the north and runs through a rural area, and then enters Pasuquin, where it serves as a major municipal street. Between Bacarra and Burgos, it becomes a rural two-lane highway and passes through interspersed barangays along the South China Sea coastline. It soon climbs the mountains upon approach to Burgos, where the highway directly serves the town. The highway zigzags through the rough terrain and overlooks the beach where Bangui Wind Farm lies. It then passes through Bangui, where it runs as a major street on the town center, crosses Bulu River, and enters Pagudpud, where it bypasses the town proper. N1 runs through the foothills that mark the edge of the Cordillera Central mountain range and runs close to the coastline of Babuyan Channel, where the highway zigzags through the cliffs through the Patapat Viaduct, a 630-meter (0.39 mi) viaduct that is required for the highway to pass the steep cliffs marking the northern edge of the Cordillera Range.

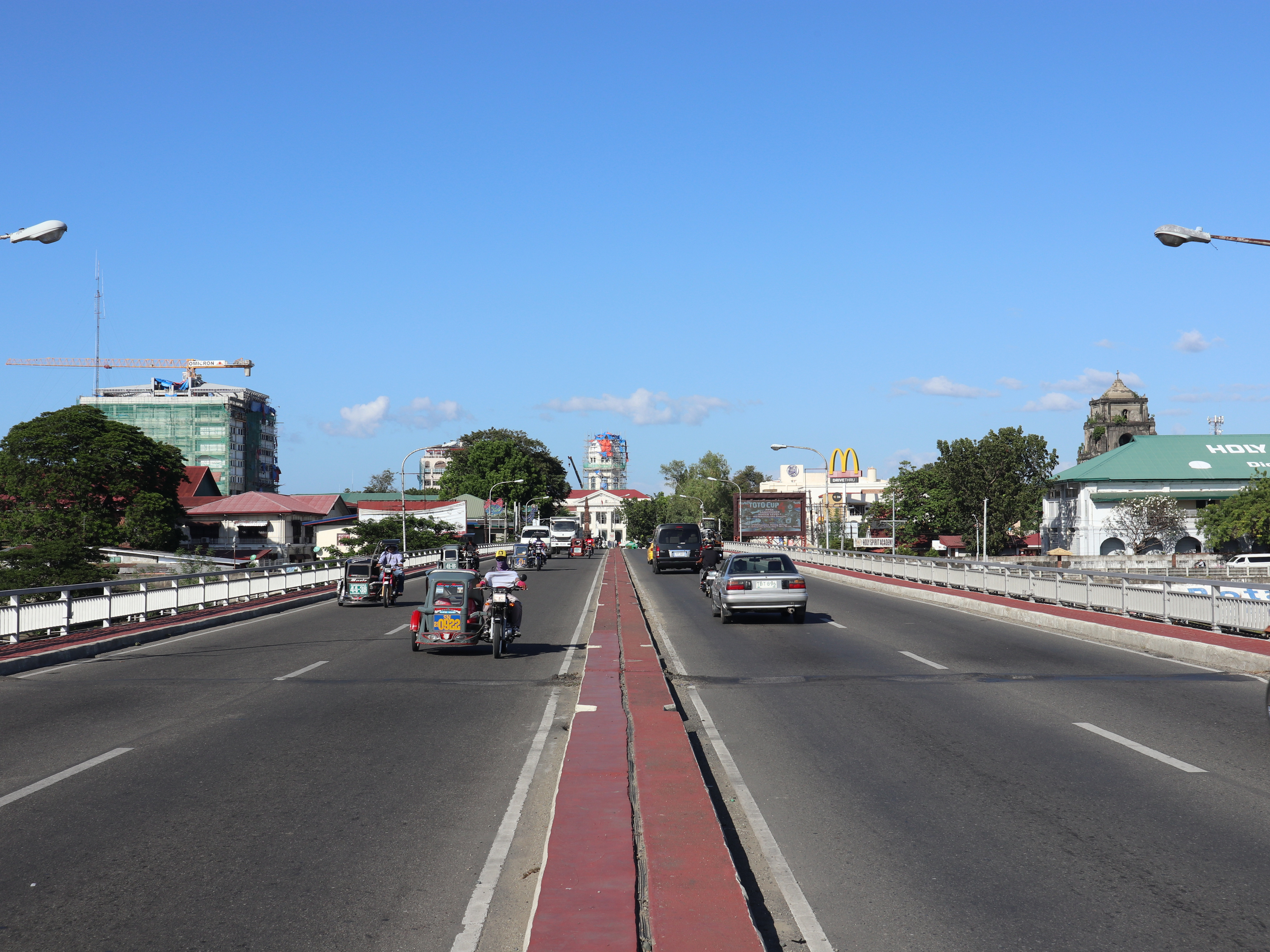
Gilbert Bridge, which carries N1 over the Padsan River in Laoag

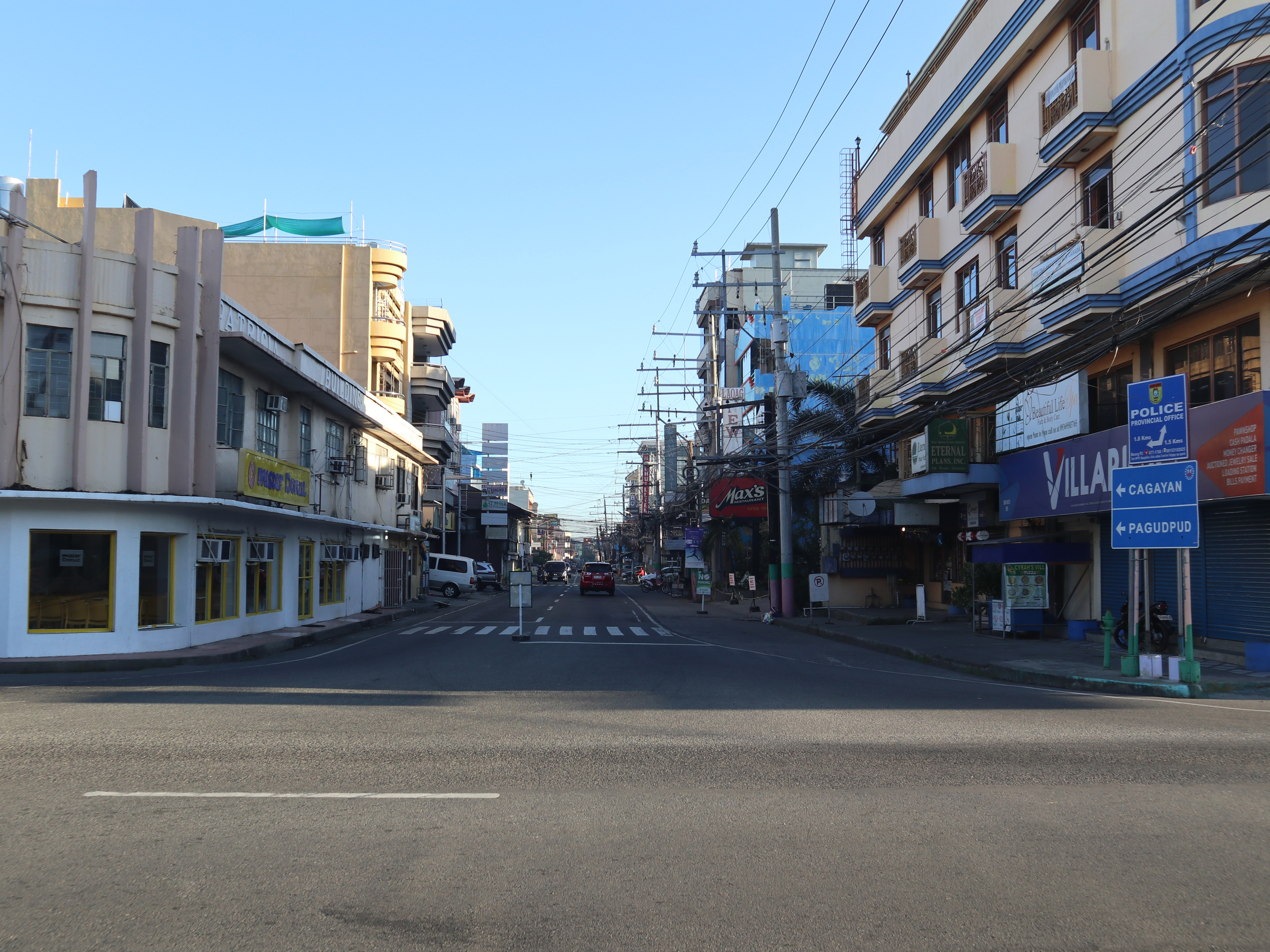
N1 turning point at the southern terminus of General Segundo Avenue in Laoag

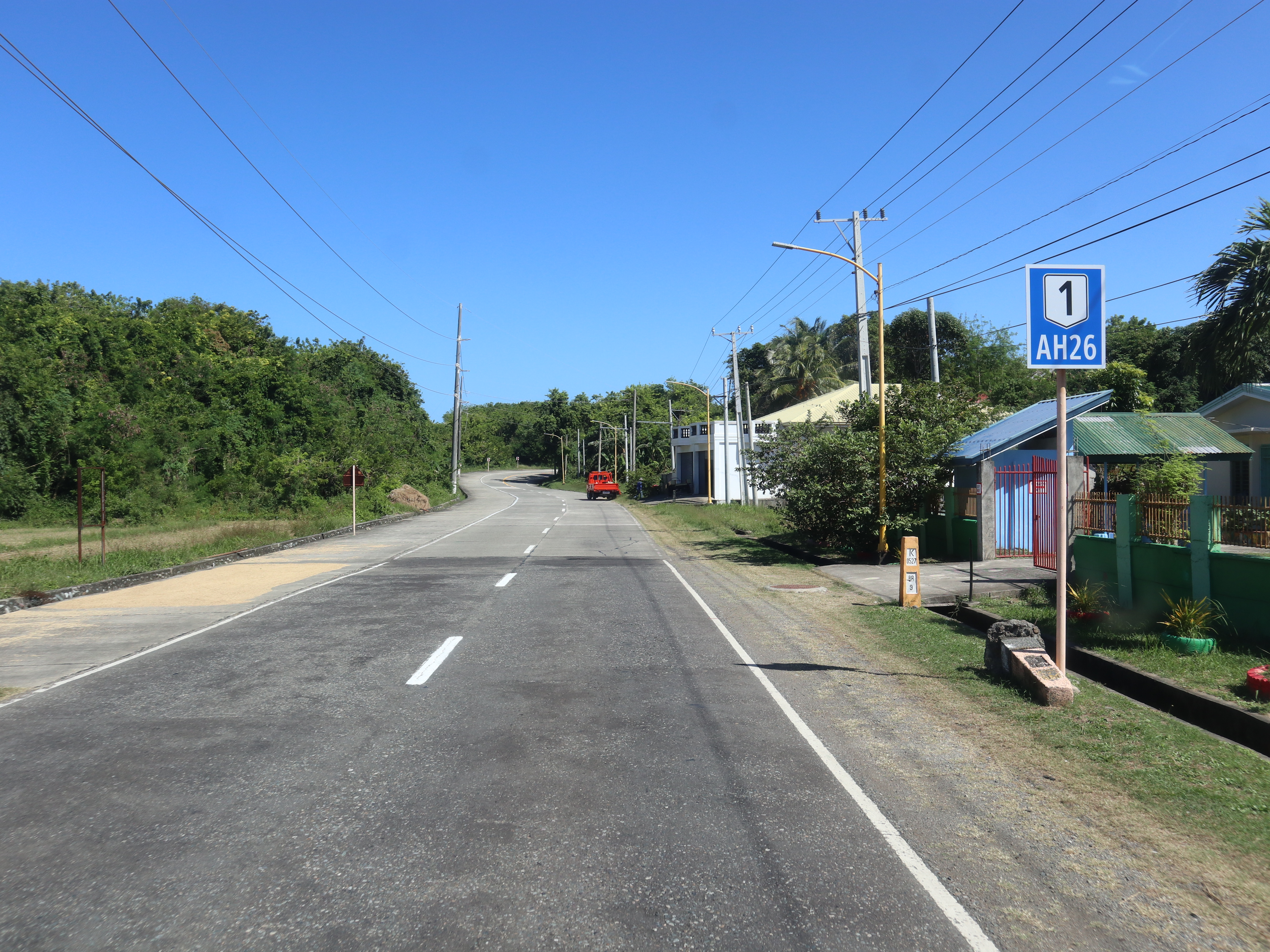
N1 in Burgos, Ilocos Norte

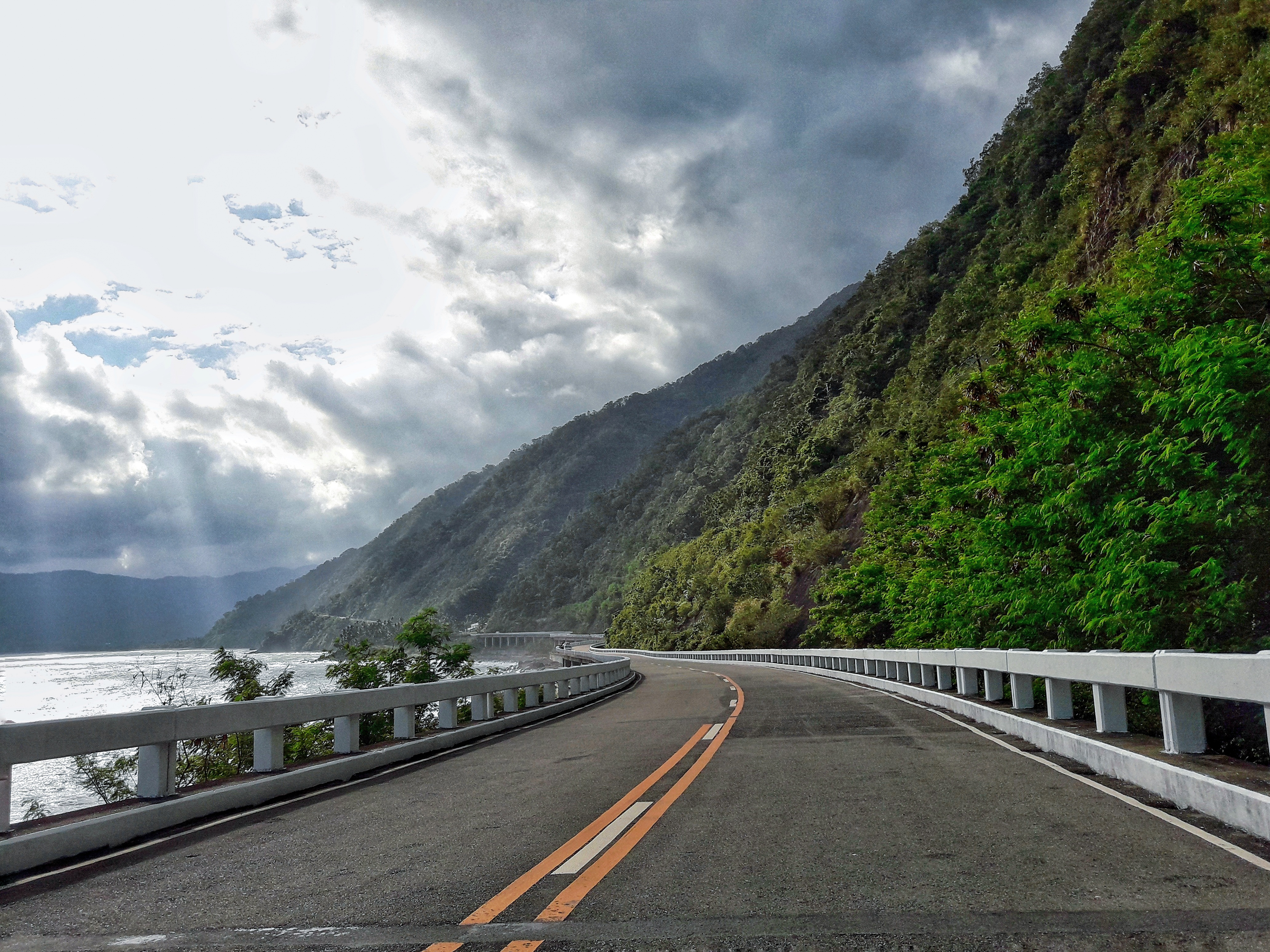
N1 at Patapat Viaduct in Pagudpud

=== Cagayan Valley ===
Bangag-Magapit Road
- Location: Aparri – Lal-lo, Cagayan
- Length: 28.84 km (17.92 mi)

Entering the Cagayan Valley region, N1 follows Manila North Road up to barangay Bangag, Aparri. From there, it turns south and becomes Bangag-Magapit Road up to the Magapit Interchange in Lal-lo. Within Lal-lo, N1 is also known as Logac–Magapit Road between namesake barangays Logac and Magapit. The segment includes the Magapit Suspension Bridge, which spans over the Cagayan River before meeting the Magapit Interchange.

At the interchange, it turns southeast and becomes Cagayan Valley Road from Magapit, Lal-lo to Tuguegarao, running parallel to the Cagayan River. In Tuguegarao, N1 turns east at the roundabout intersection with N106 (Tuguegarao Diversion Road) and N51 (Santiago–Tuguegarao Road) to bypass the city proper towards Peñablanca and run parallel to the Cagayan River up to Reina Mercedes, Isabela. It then enters the province of Isabela and Nueva Vizcaya as Maharlika Highway, although it is alternatively called Cagayan Valley Road up to Guiguinto, Bulacan. It serves as the main artery of Isabela alongside N51. In Santiago, Isabela, it turns southwest at the Mabini Rotonda, its intersection with N51, and becomes a one-way northbound route. Southbound traffic is redirected via R.C. Miranda Road and Boulevard to bypass this one-way section.

At Nueva Vizcaya, N1 runs parallel to and crosses the Magat River. In Solano, it navigates through the poblacion locally as J. Manzano Street, cutting through as J.P. Rizal Avenue, and finally exiting as Aquino Avenue towards its segment bypassing Bayombong poblacion. Further in Santa Fe, it then reaches the Dalton Pass, where Sierra Madre and Caraballo Sur meet.

Although Cagayan Valley Road is limited to Cagayan, its name also alternatively extends up to N1's section in Bulacan.

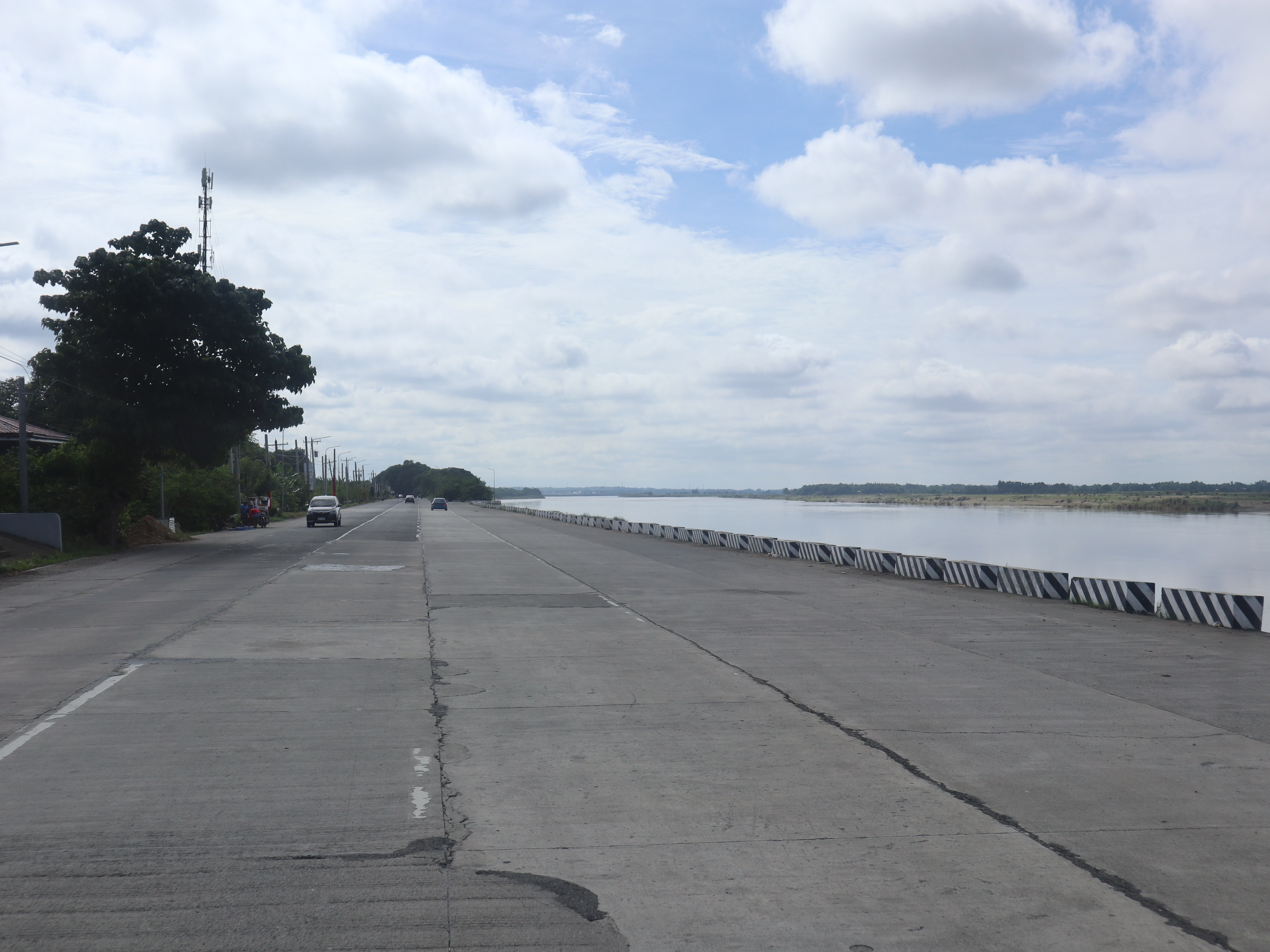
N1 along the Cagayan River in Tuguegarao, Cagayan

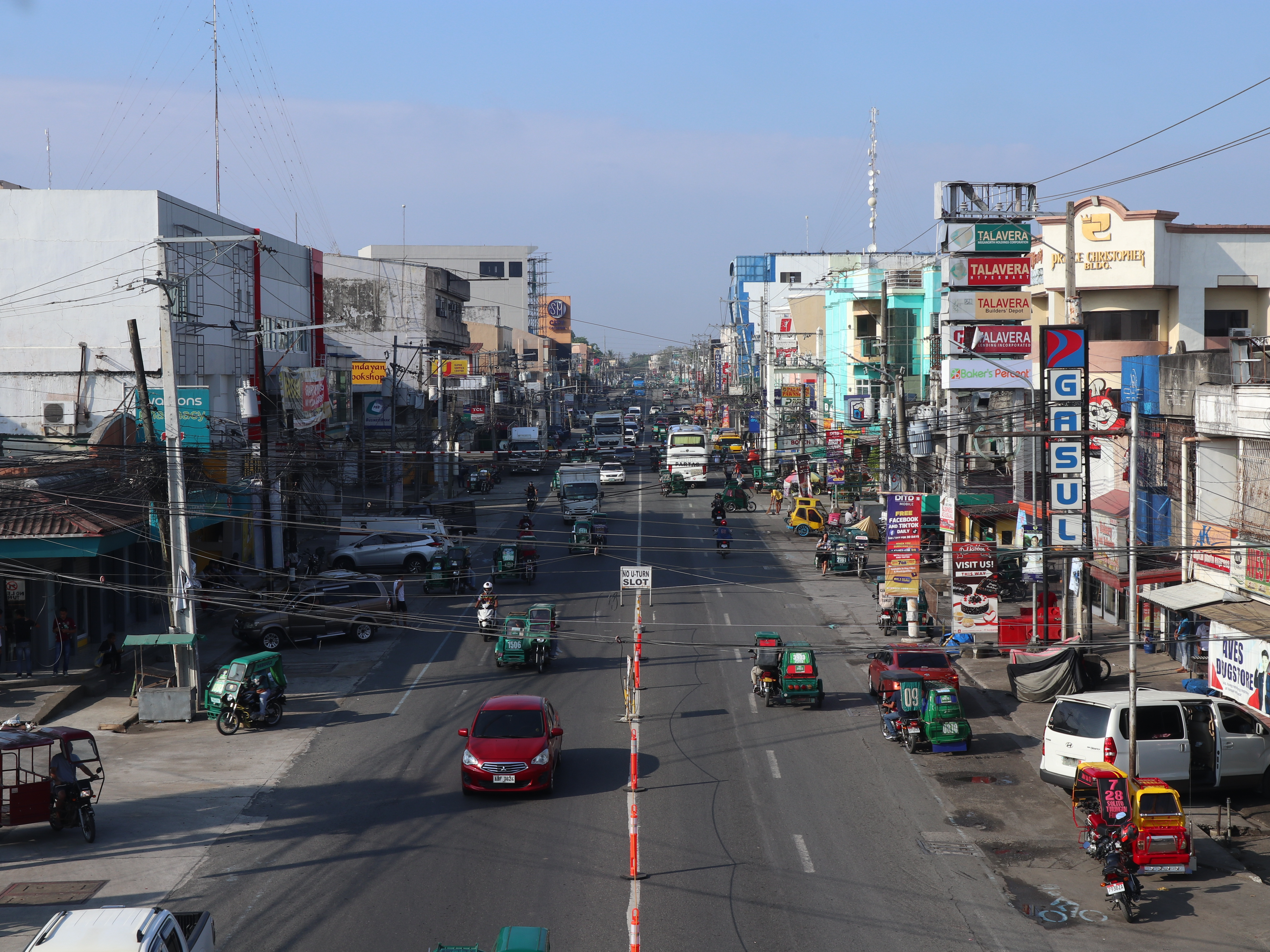
N1 through the city proper of Cauayan, Isabela

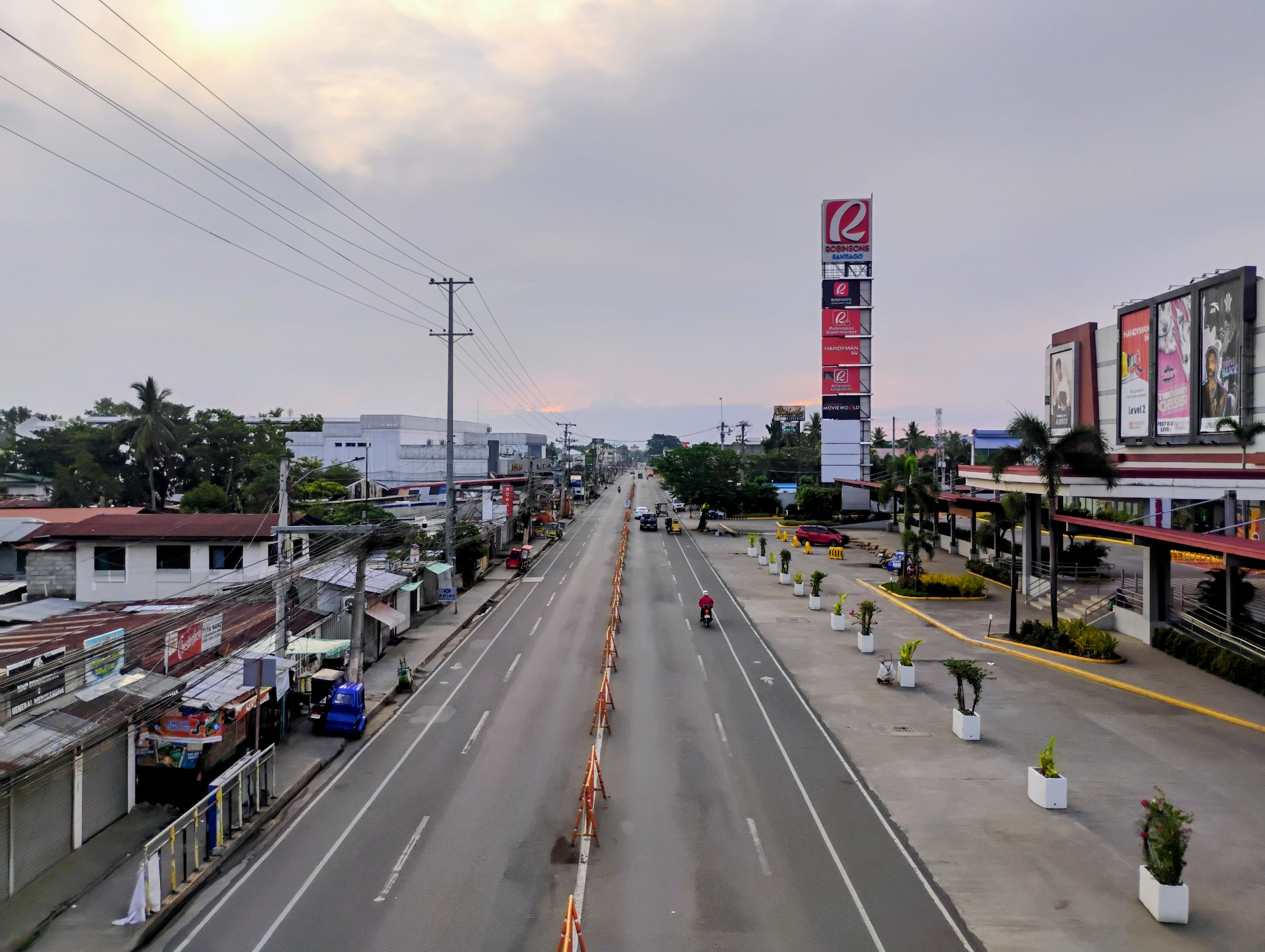
N1 in Santiago, Isabela

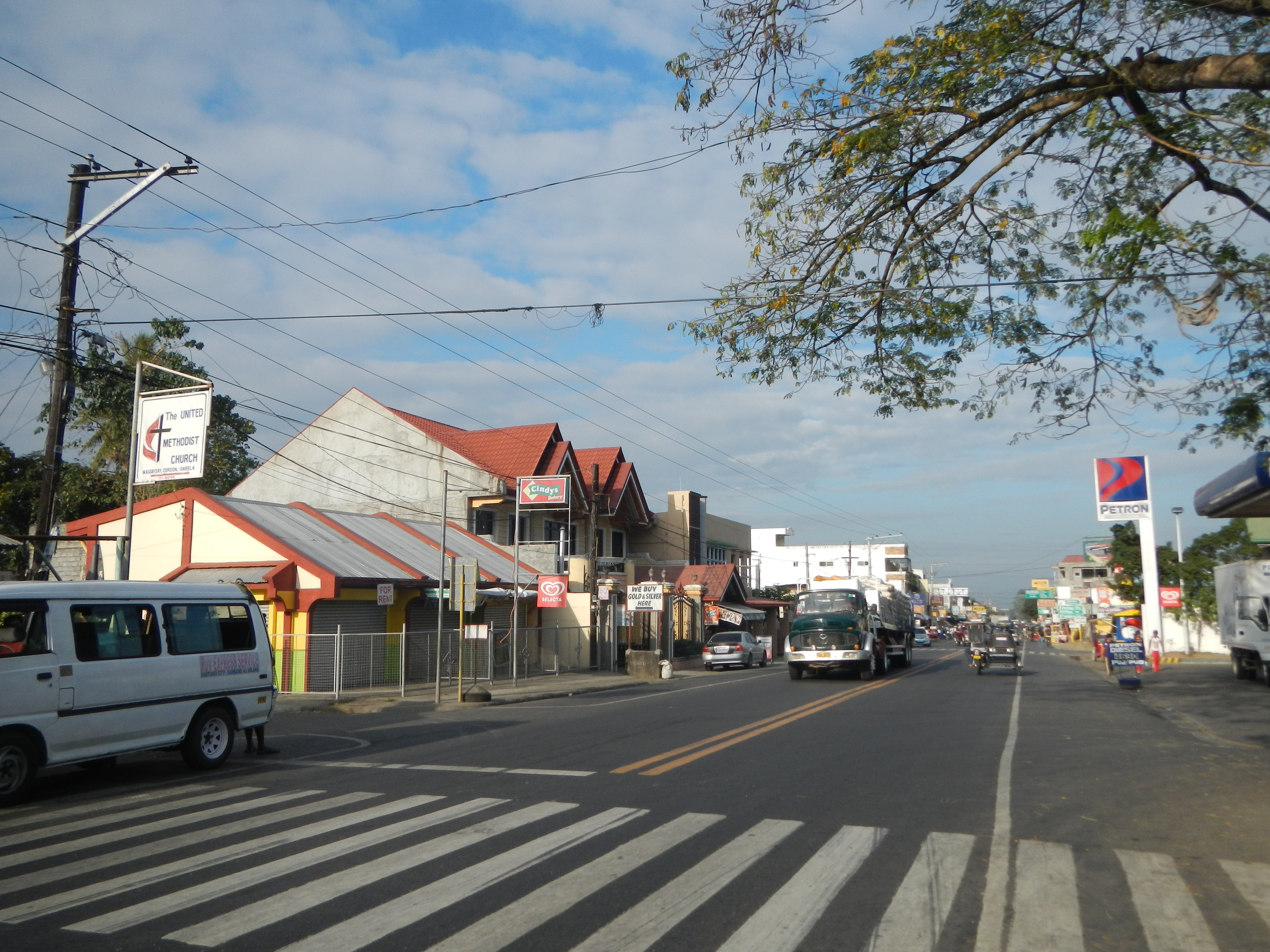
N1 in Cordon, Isabela

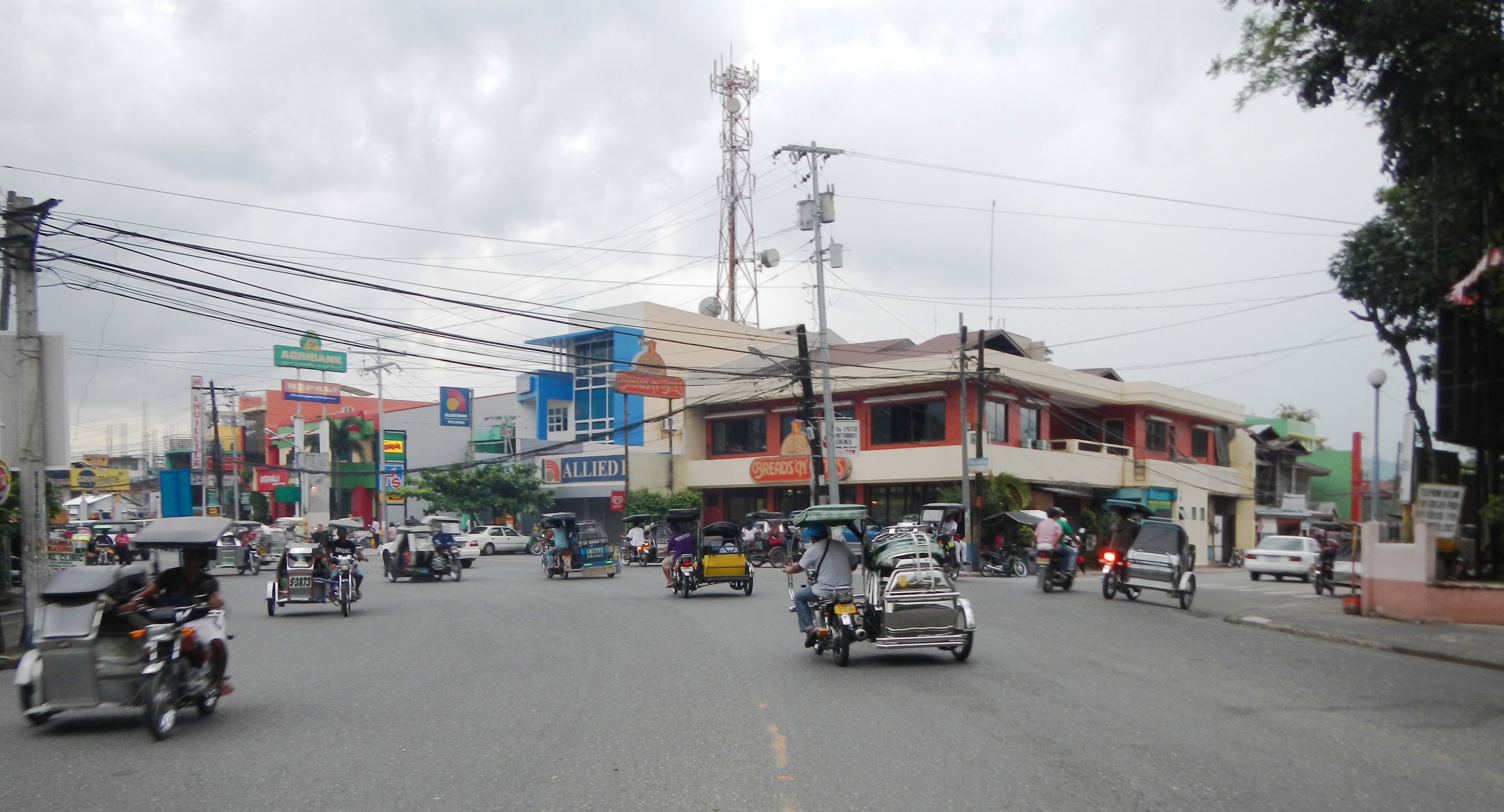
N1 as Aquino Avenue in Solano, Nueva Vizcaya

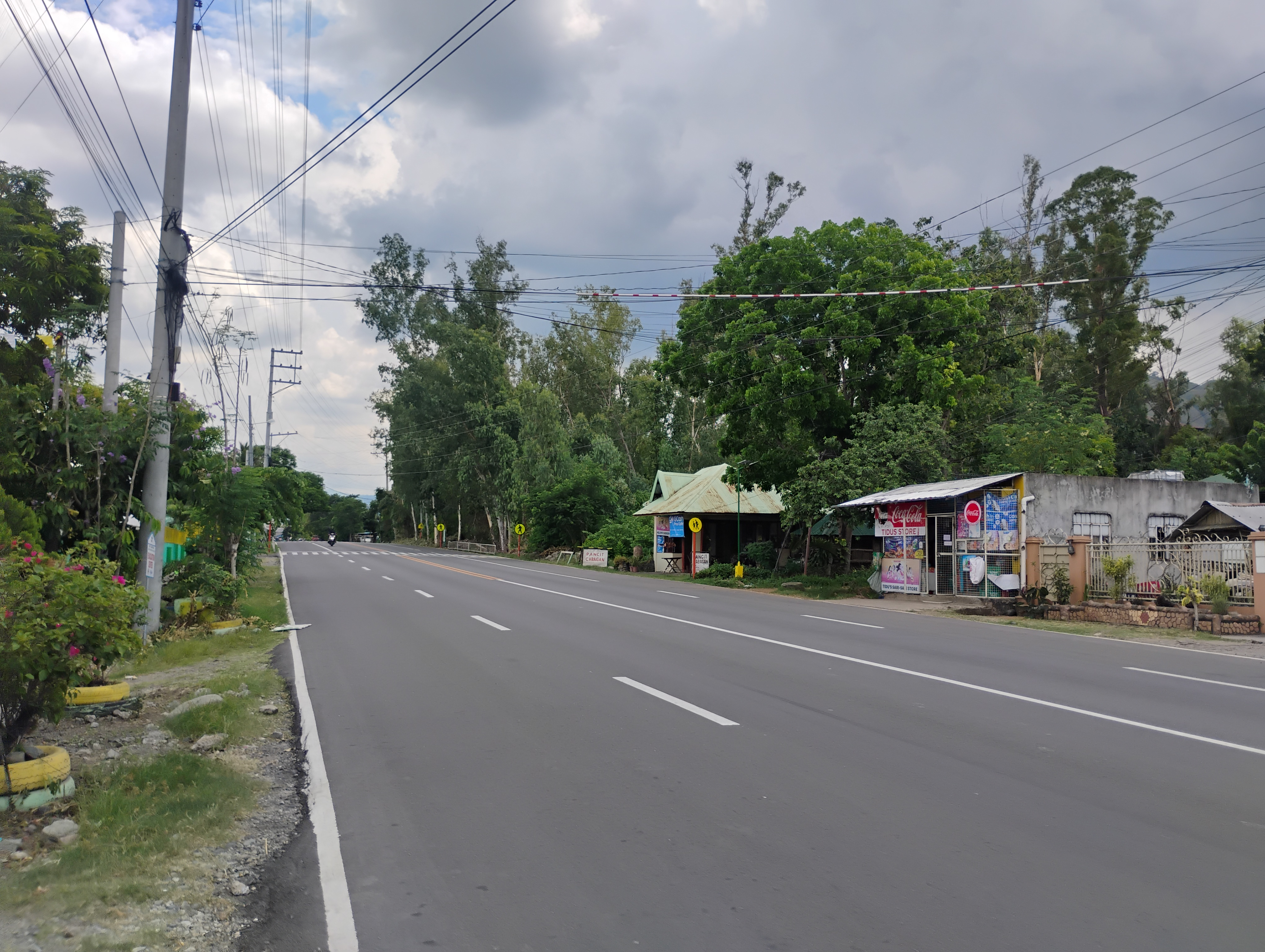
N1 in Aritao, Nueva Vizcaya

=== Central Luzon ===
==== Nueva Ecija ====
The highway soon enters Nueva Ecija at Carranglan. It then descends to the plain terrain in San Jose as it approaches the poblacion. It then cuts through Muñoz and Talavera before turning east by its junction with N114 (Nueva Ecija–Pangasinan Road) in Santo Domingo. It then cuts through Talavera (once again, this time with the poblacion), Cabanatuan, Santa Rosa, San Leonardo and Gapan.

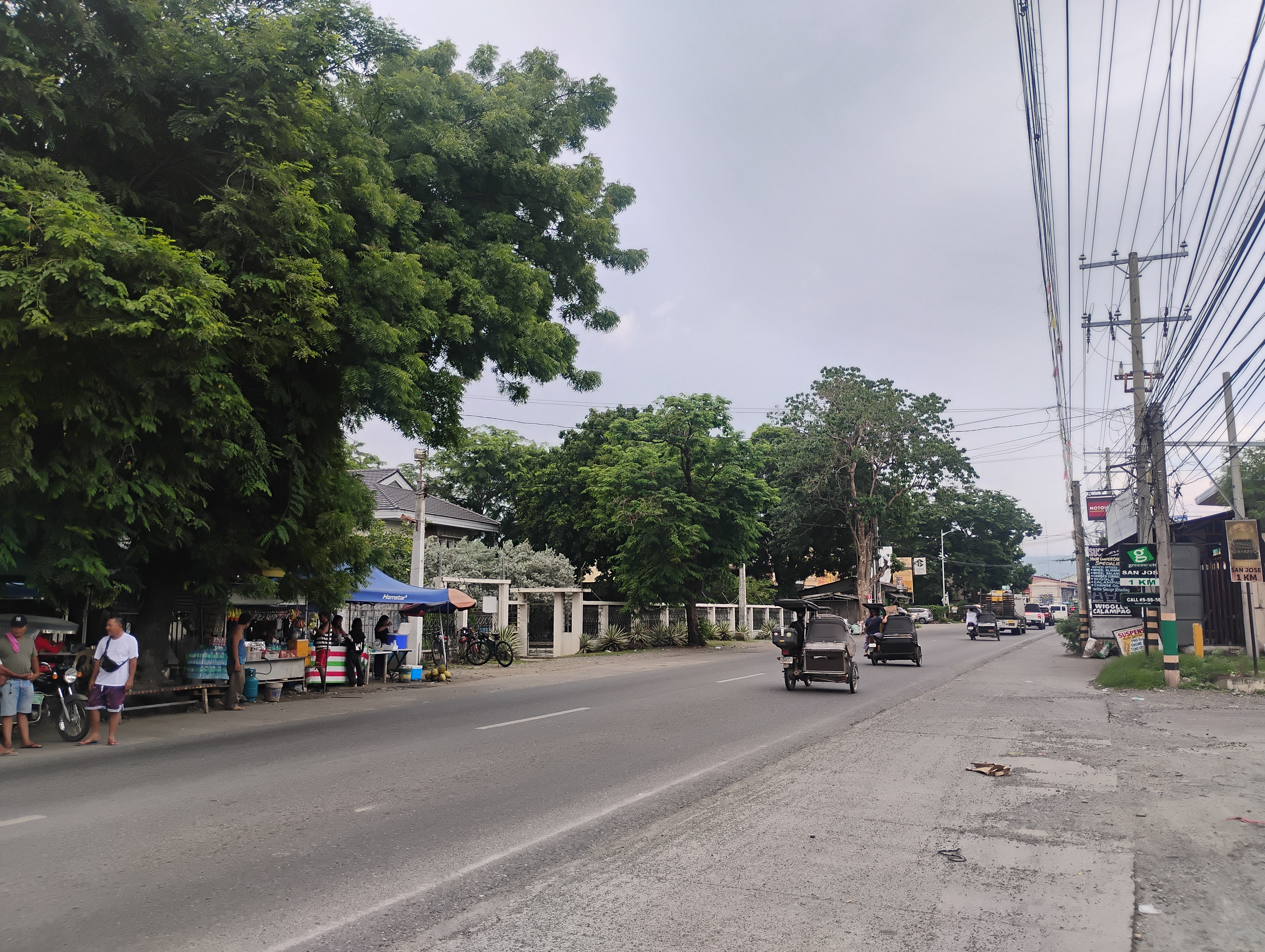
N1 in San Jose

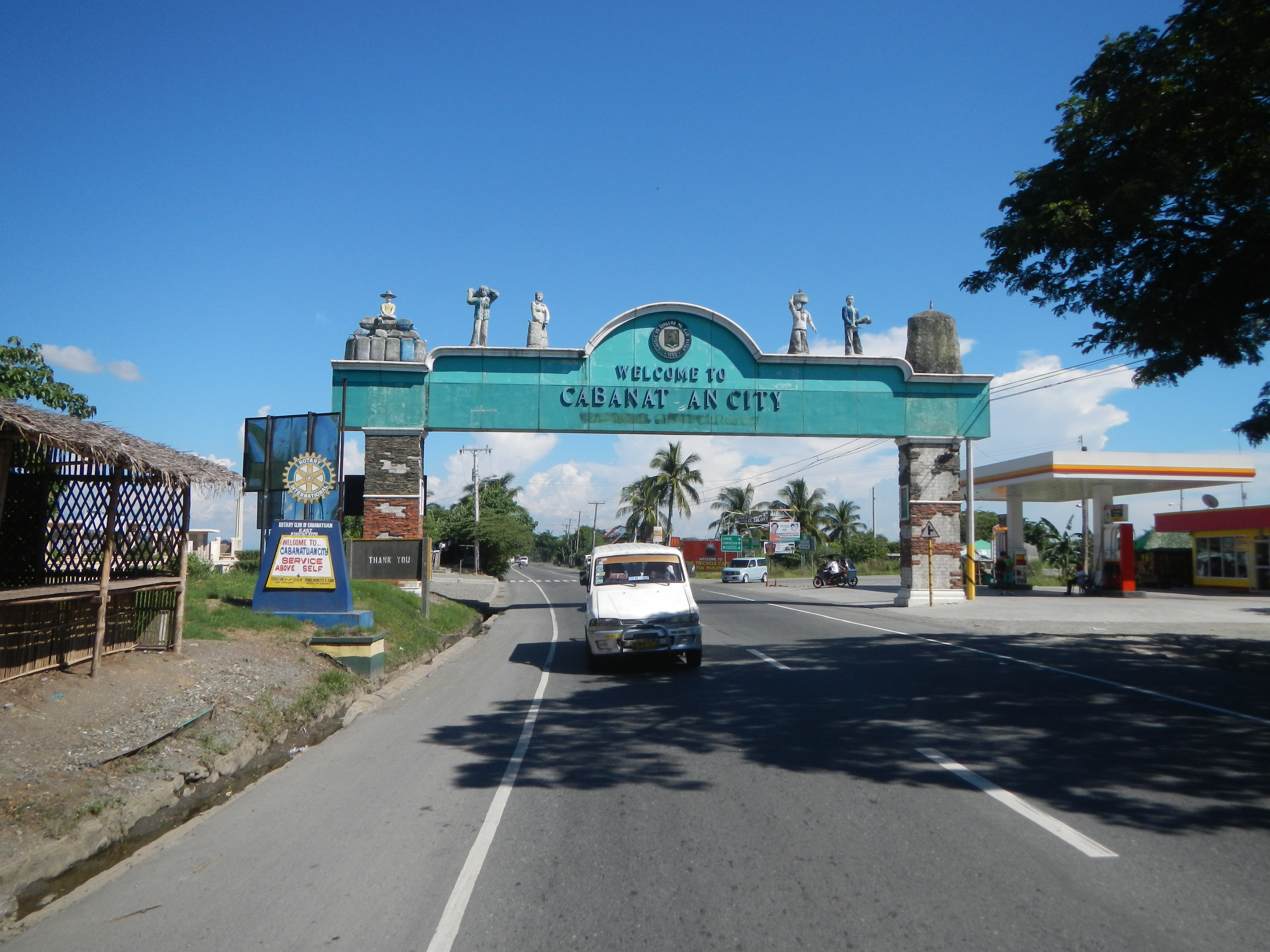
N1 at the Cabanatuan–Talavera boundary

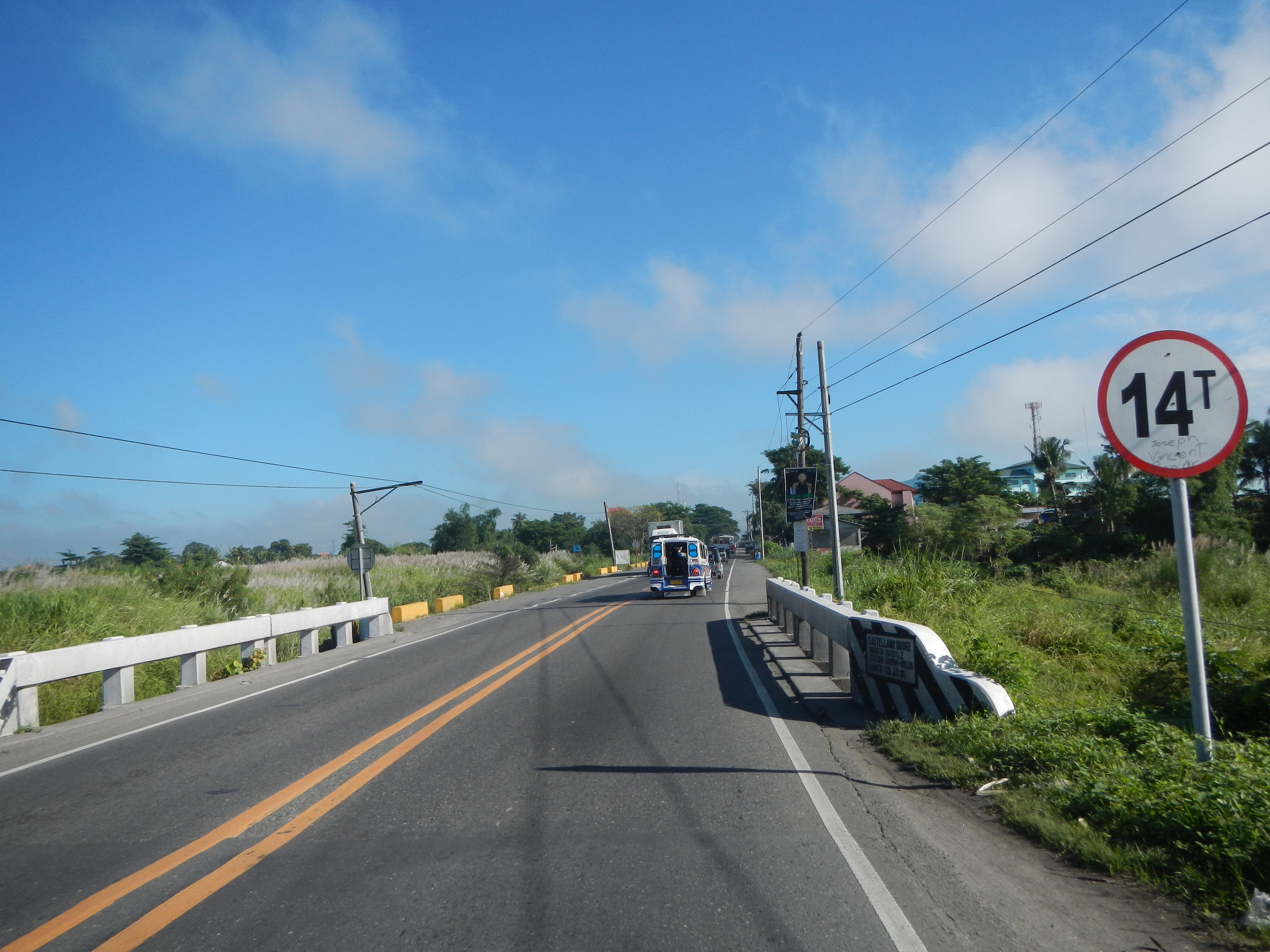
N1 in San Leonardo

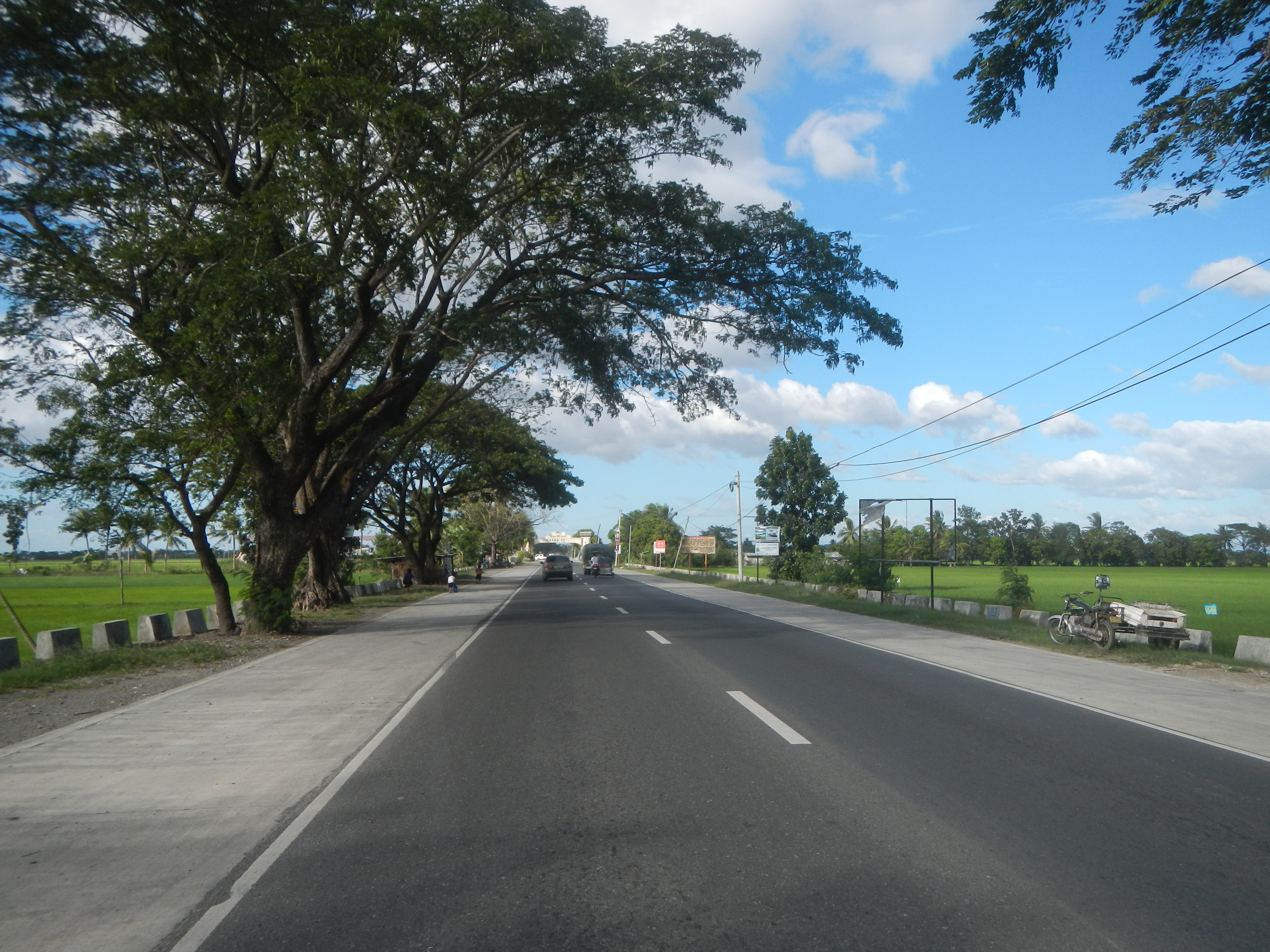
N1 in Gapan

==== Bulacan ====
===== San Rafael to Guiguinto =====
Doña Remedios Trinidad Highway
- DRT Highway
- Location: San Rafael – Pulilan, Bulacan

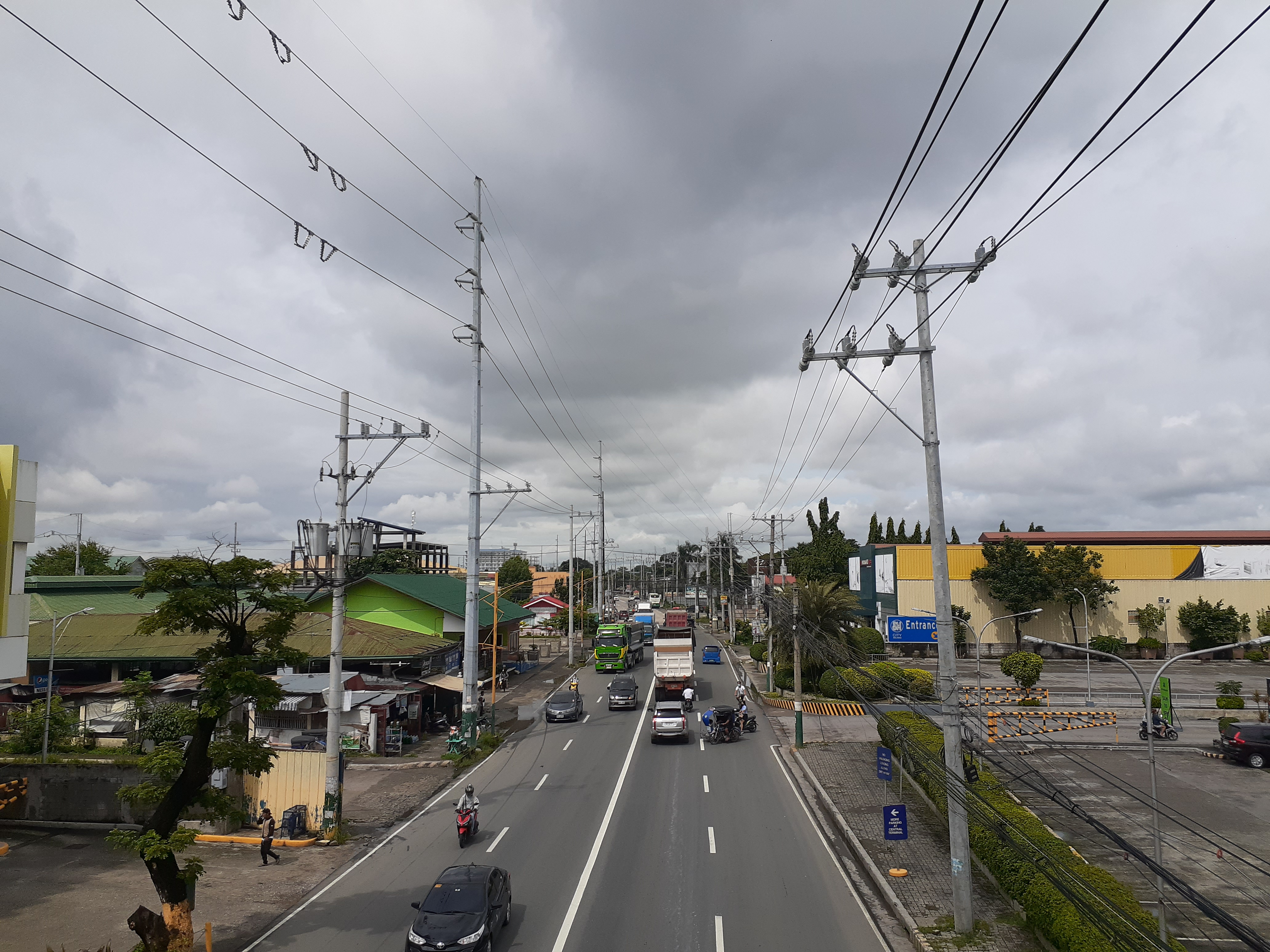
N1 as Doña Remedios Trinidad Highway in Baliwag

N1 soon enters Bulacan at San Miguel, where it begins on a straight route. It then enters the poblacion of San Miguel, which it bypasses, and the highway begins to curve through most of its length between San Ildefonso and San Rafael, where the route runs through rice paddies. At its intersection with San Rafael Municipal Road, the highway curves to the southwest to follow Doña Remedios Trinidad Highway (DRT Highway) until the intersection of the old Cagayan Valley Road and Esguerra Street in Pulilan. DRT Highway serves as a bypass of the old Cagayan Valley Road through Baliwag poblacion. At Guiguinto, it crosses the North Luzon Expressway (NLEX) along with the Santa Rita Interchange, where Asian Highway 26 leaves for the expressway. Despite this split, the road continues to be known as the Maharlika Highway as it continues its course southwards up to Tabang Interchange, where it meets the original route of NLEX and MacArthur Highway (Manila North Road).

===== Guiguinto to Meycauayan =====
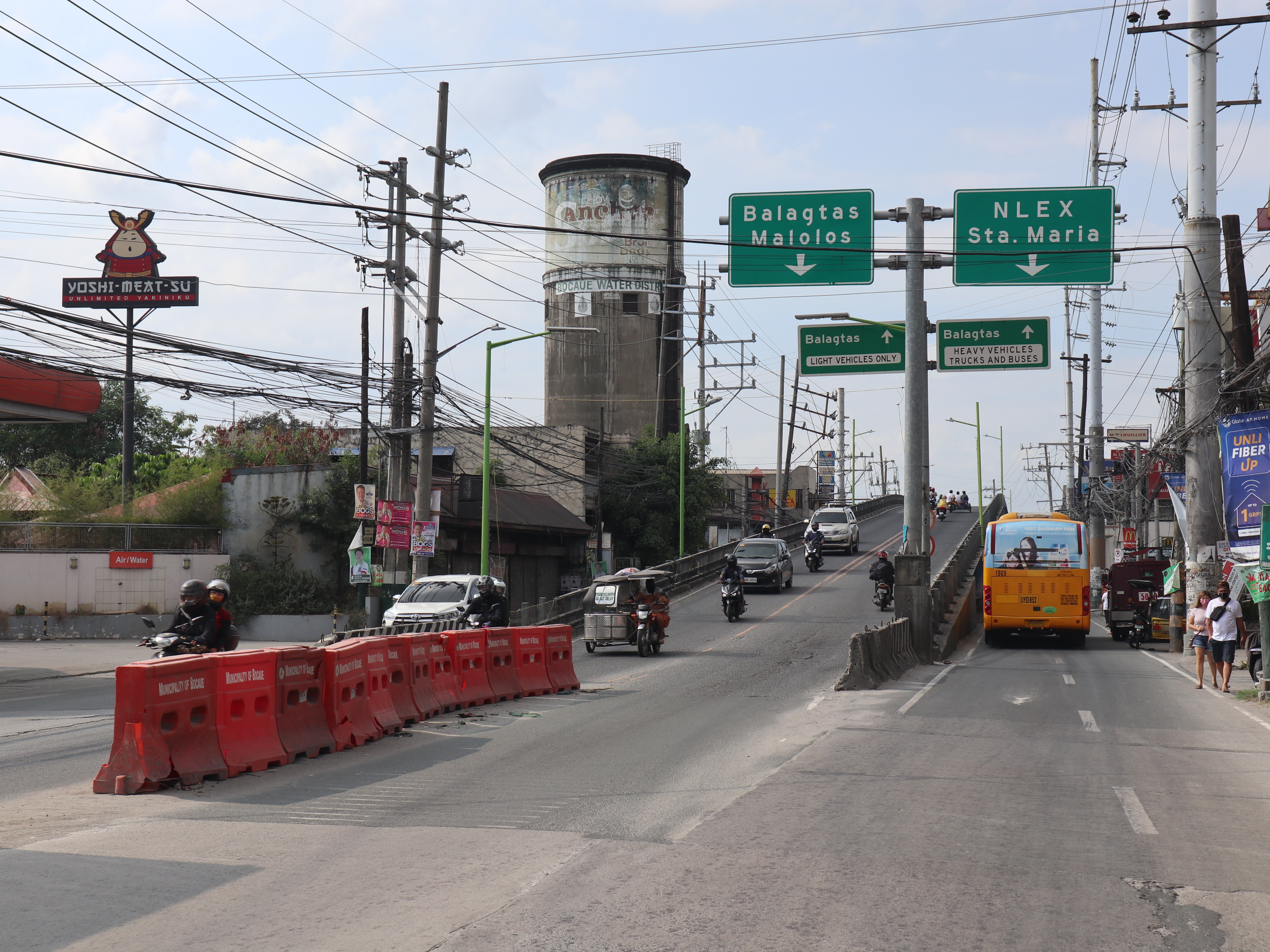
N1 as MacArthur Highway with the Bocaue Flyover in Bocaue. This segment, however, is not part of the AH26 concurrency.

Past Tabang Interchange, N1 begins to follow Manila North Road once again, this time as MacArthur Highway, which serves as a major toll-free highway over southern Bulacan. It soon crosses the Philippine National Railways/North–South Commuter Railway right of way and enters Balagtas, where it directly passes through its poblacion. It soon crosses the Bigaa River, where it passes through residential and industrial areas, and curves upon entering Bocaue, where it bypasses the town center. A flyover restricted for use by light vehicles crosses Fortunato Halili Avenue to Santa Maria with service roads serving as frontage and heavy vehicle routes. The highway then curves and traverses through the residential barangays of Bocaue and soon enters Marilao and Meycauayan.

=== Metro Manila ===
==== Valenzuela to Pasay ====
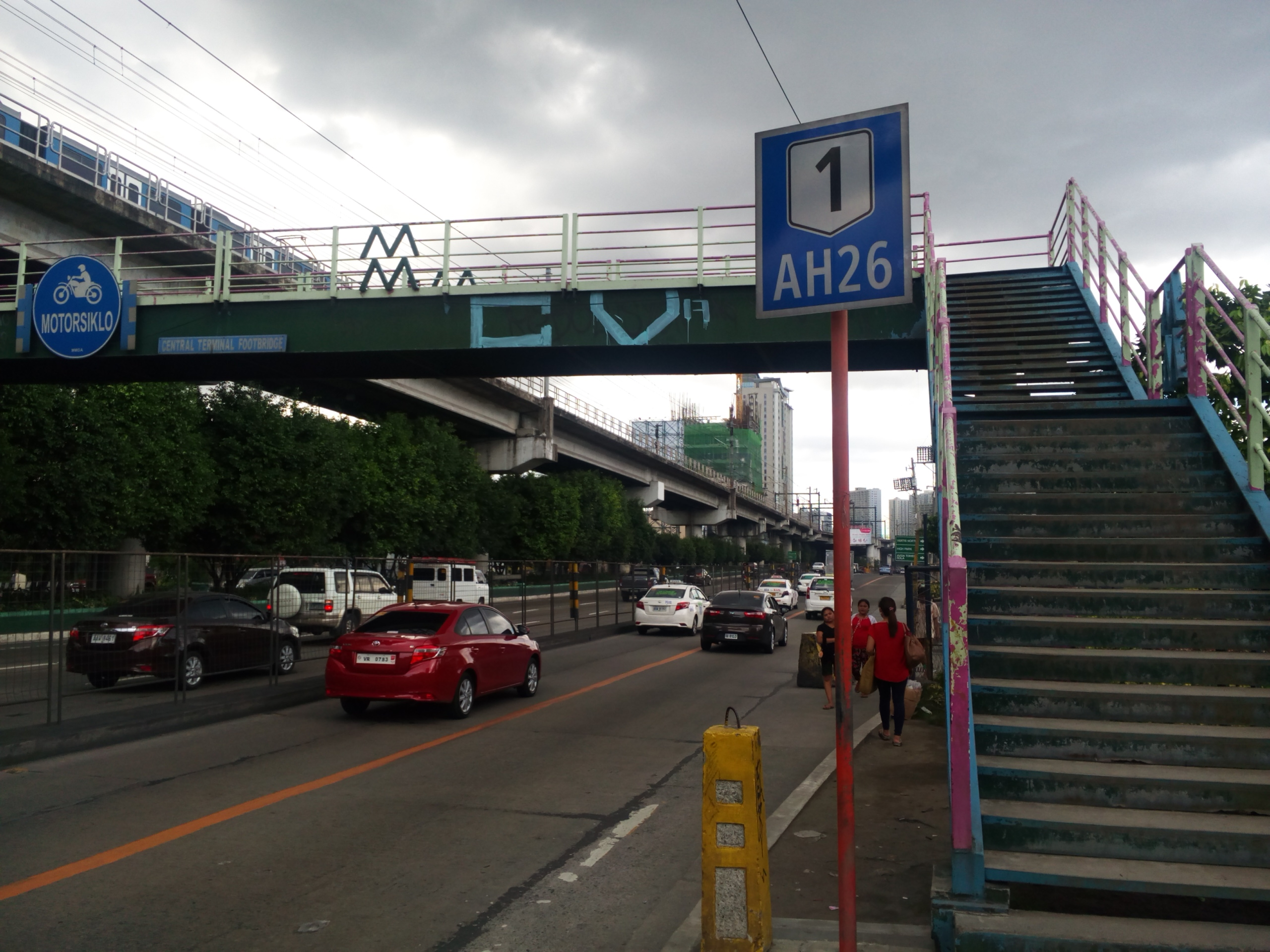
A reassurance marker for N1/AH26 at EDSA northbound in Quezon City

Entering Metro Manila, the highway follows MacArthur Highway over Valenzuela, which runs on a four to six-lane highway up to the Bonifacio Monument (Monumento) Circle in Caloocan. There, the Asian Highway 26 concurrency returns on N1 as it turns east to follow Epifanio de los Santos Avenue (EDSA) up to Pasay. The whole road, bypassing the capital city of Manila, runs through the central business districts of Metro Manila, most notably Araneta Center, Ortigas Center, and Makati Central Business District. The LRT Line 1 and MRT Line 3 utilizes the center island of EDSA on most segments between Caloocan and Pasay. N1 ends below the EDSA Flyover at N120/AH26/N61 (Roxas Boulevard) in Pasay.

A 19-kilometer (12 mi) gap in the highway is filled by the South Luzon Expressway (SLEX) and Skyway between Makati and Muntinlupa. It would have been filled by Taft Avenue Extension, starting from EDSA, going southwards via Quirino and Diego Cera Avenues (N62) and ends at Manila South Road below Alabang Viaduct through Alabang–Zapote Road (N411).

==== Muntinlupa ====
Manila South Road
- National Road; Old National Road; Maharlika Highway
- Location: Muntinlupa – Calamba, Laguna
- Length: 30.36 km (18.86 mi)

N1 resumes below the Alabang Viaduct of South Luzon Expressway (SLEX/E2/AH26) in Alabang, Muntinlupa, where it intersects with SLEX's Alabang Exit, East Service Road, N411 (Alabang–Zapote Road), and N142 (Montillano Street). The highway assumes the name Manila South Road, locally National Road or Old National Road, or Maharlika Highway, although this section does not assume the Asian Highway 26 concurrency, which is designated instead to SLEX. It runs as a commercial artery through the city up to the boundary with Laguna in San Pedro over the Tunasan River.

=== Calabarzon ===
==== San Pedro to Calamba ====
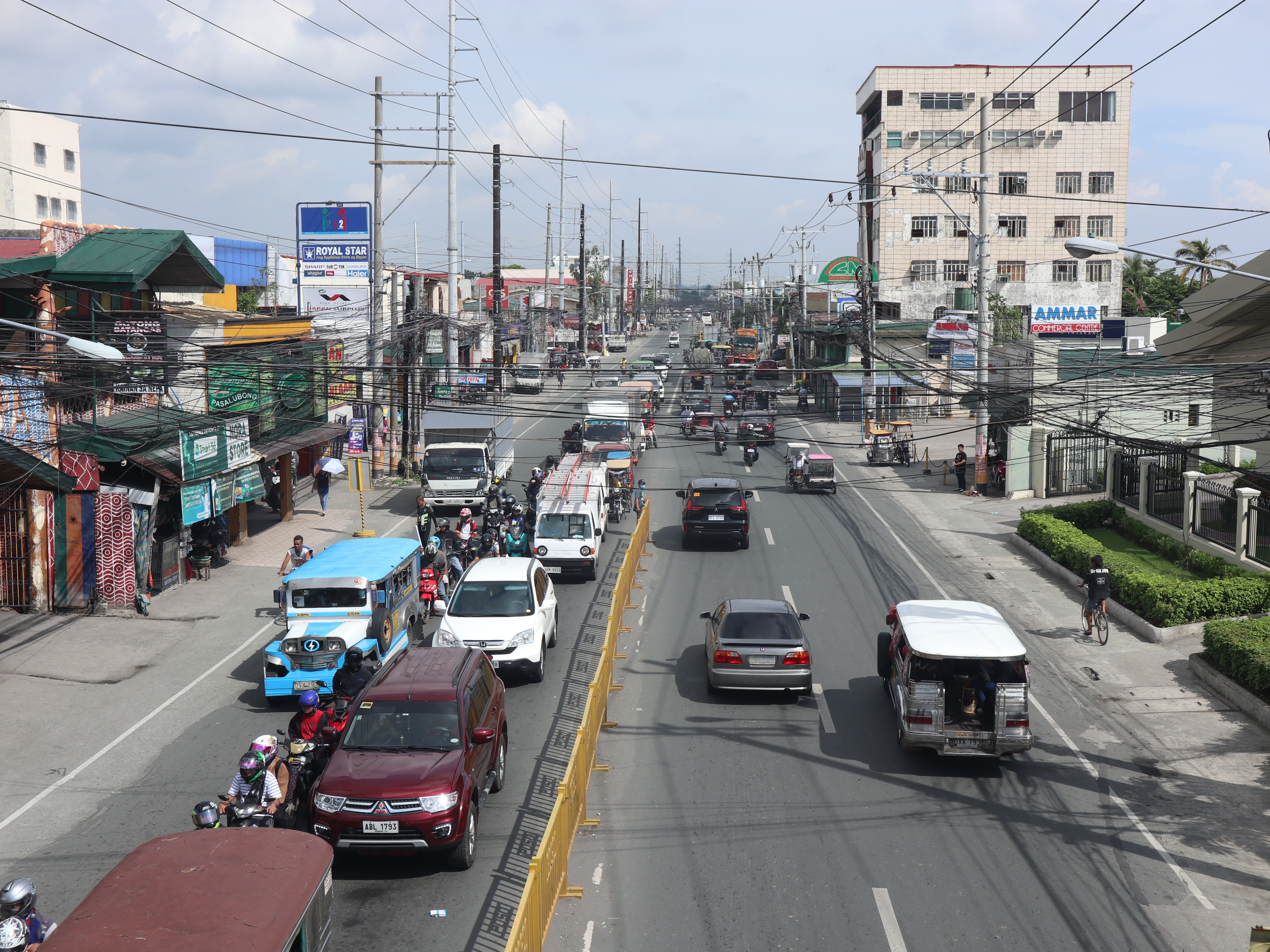
N1 as Manila South Road in Biñan. This segment, however, is not part of the AH26 concurrency.

N1 generally serves as a four-lane toll-free highway serving the suburban cities of northwestern Laguna alongside the tolled South Luzon Expressway. Most sections of N1 between San Pedro and Calamba serve as commercial streets bypassing the old poblacions. Most of N1 is four-lane with a painted median divider.

It enters Laguna in San Pedro, where it serves as a major commercial street, with a maximum of four lanes. It then enters the cities of Biñan, Santa Rosa, Cabuyao, and Calamba, where it becomes one-way southbound between N66 (Calamba–Pagsanjan Road) and N420-2 (Rizal Shrine Road) at the Calamba Crossing. In barangay Real, the highway is alternatively known as Real Road.

==== Calamba to Tayabas ====
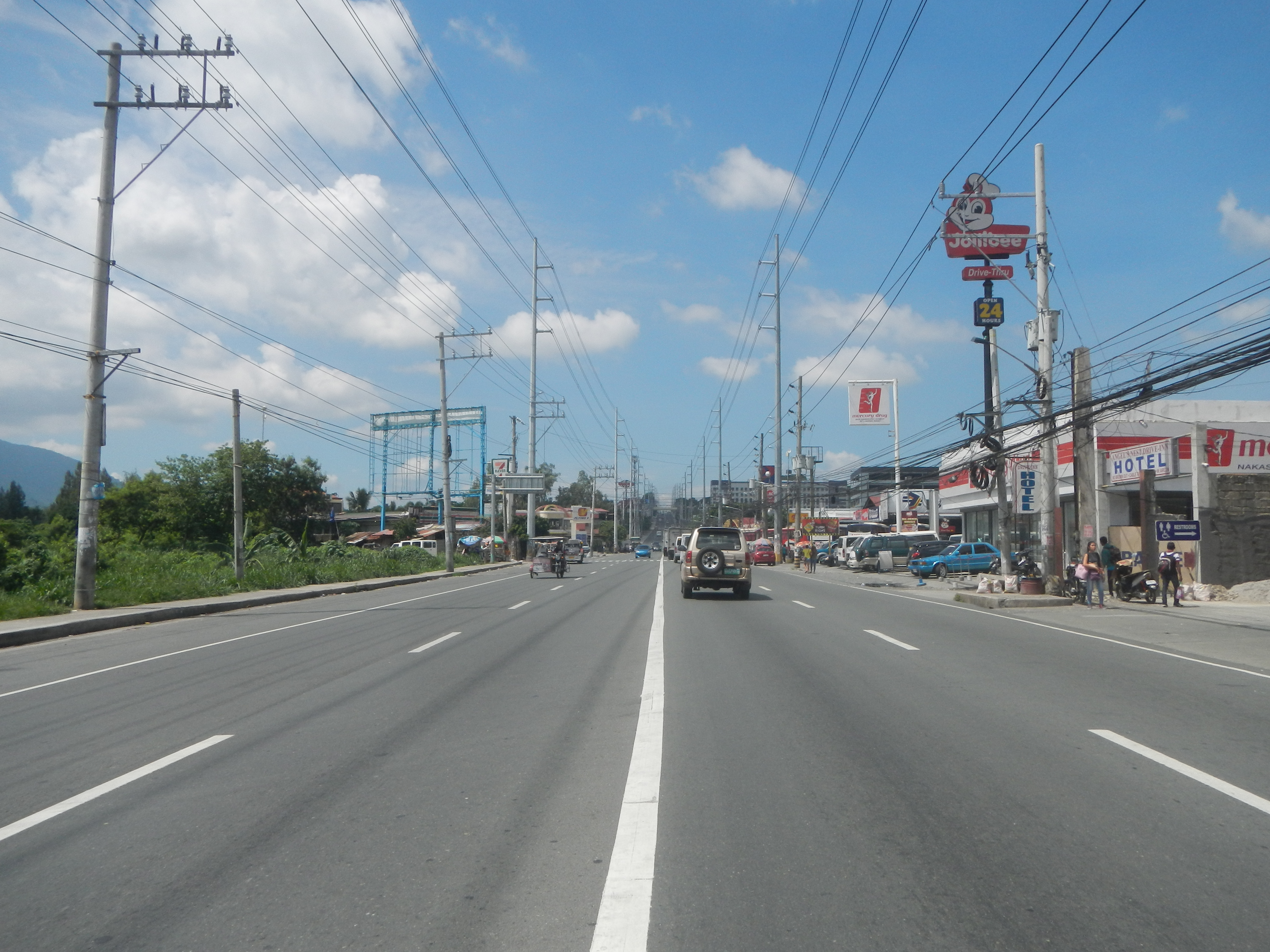
N1 in Turbina, Calamba

N1 soon crosses the South Luzon Expressway at the Calamba Exit, where the concurrency with the Asian Highway 26 returns on the highway, and veers south. It then enters the province of Batangas at Santo Tomas, where it intersects with STAR Tollway and bypasses the poblacion. At the Santo Tomas Roundabout, where it meets N4 (Jose P. Laurel Highway) and N421-2 (Governor Carpio Avenue), it turns southeast as it leaves the province. It then re-enters the province of Laguna through Alaminos and then San Pablo, bypassing its poblacion.

N1 then enters the province of Quezon at Tiaong. There, it passes the Villa Escudero plantations and meets the future Tiaong Interchange of SLEX Toll Road 4, then cuts through the poblacion as Doña Tating Street and then veers east as Don V. Robles Street. It then traverses the municipalities of Candelaria (as Rizal Avenue through the poblacion) and Sariaya (as General Luna Street through the poblacion) and the city of Tayabas, where it turns southeast towards Lucena at the Calumpang Junction.

==== Tayabas to Pagbilao ====
Lucena Diversion Road
- MSR Diversion Road
- Location: Tayabas – Pagbilao, Quezon
- Length: 9.87 km (6.13 mi)

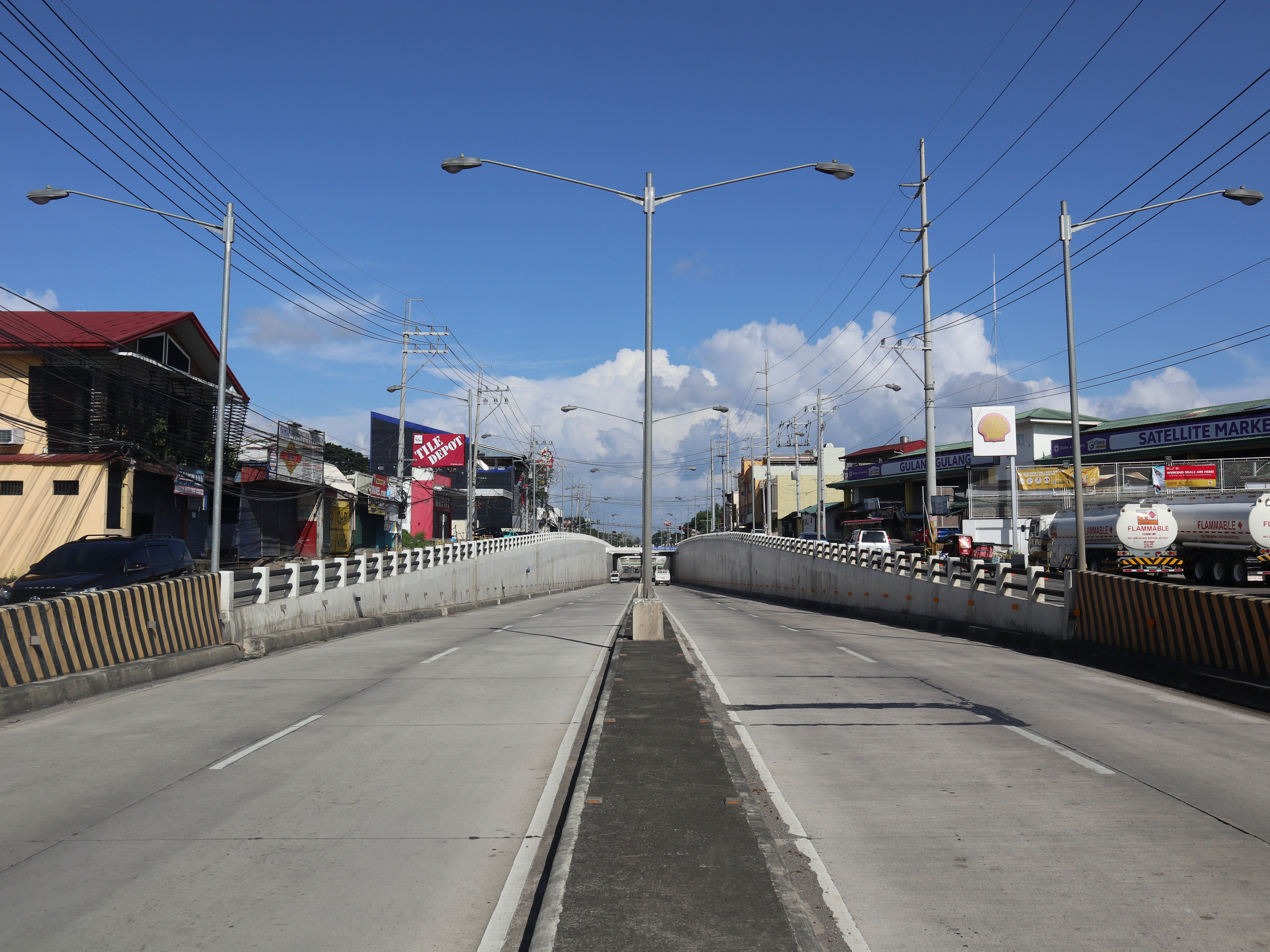
N1 as Lucena Diversion Road in Lucena

From Tayabas through Lucena, N1 then follows the entire Lucena Diversion Road (also known as MSR Diversion Road), a wide road that bypasses the Old Manila South Road alignment, which cuts through Lucena poblacion, up to the road's eastern end in Pagbilao.

==== Pagbilao to Calauag ====
In Pagbilao poblacion, N1 briefly splits into MSR Diversion Road (collective name for the segment locally known as C.M. Recto Street and Pornobi Street, respectively) for westbound traffic and J.P. Rizal Street for eastbound traffic. Onto the area of the protected Quezon National Forest Park in the Sierra Madre, it then becomes alternatively known as New Diversion Road, the longer road bypassing the Old Zigzag Road alignment cutting through the park.

The route enters Atimonan, bypassing the poblacion before reaching Quezon’s eastern coastline. It then continues through Plaridel and then Gumaca, where it becomes J.P. Rizal Street in the poblacion south of the Gumaca River, then shifts eastward as A. Bonifacio Street toward Lopez. Within Lopez poblacion, it is known as General Vera Avenue before traversing Calauag.

=== Bicol Region ===
==== Santa Elena to Sipocot ====
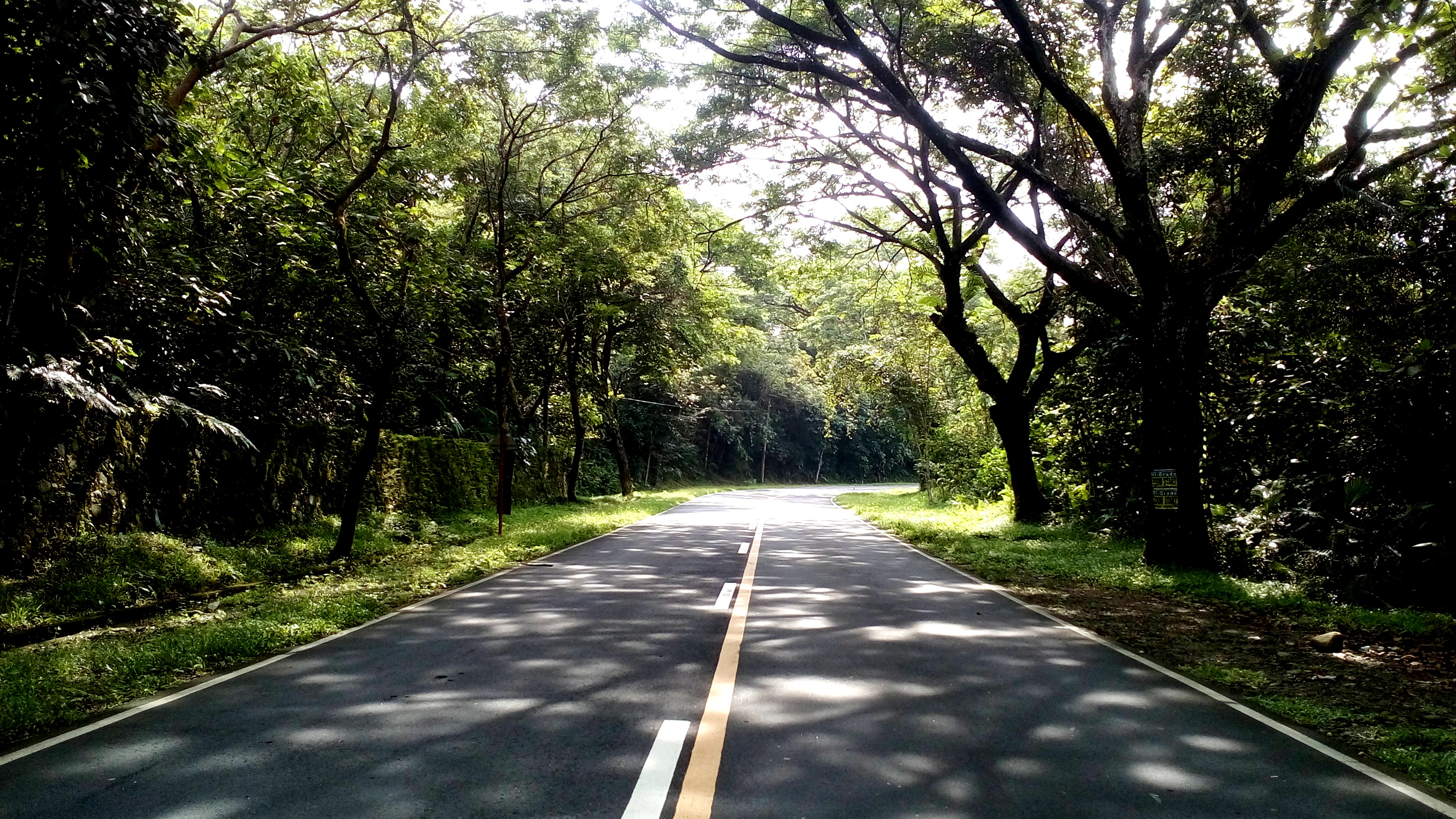
N1 through the Bicol Natural Park

N1 enters Camarines Norte at the municipality of Santa Elena, meeting the N68 (Andaya Highway) that serves as a southern bypass of N1 which traverses the sparsely populated province of Camarines Norte. After traveling through kilometers of jungle, N1 navigates through the poblacion of Labo. It then becomes a rural highway again, passing by the municipalities of Vinzons and Talisay before bypassing Daet. It passes through Bicol Natural Park where the road winds through mountainous and hilly terrain. N1 enters Camarines Sur at the municipality of Sipocot, where it meets again N68 at its eastern end.

==== Sipocot to Matnog ====
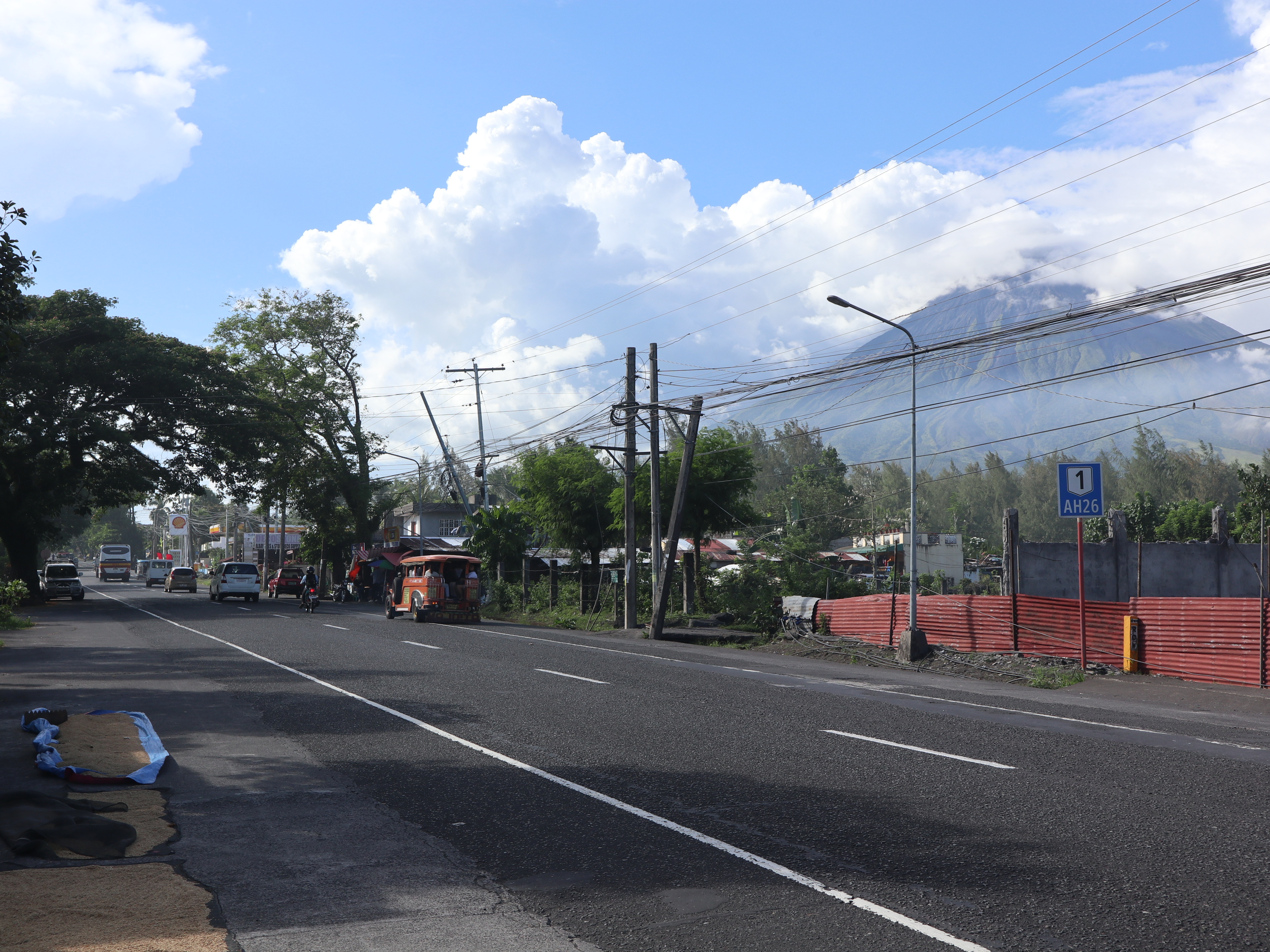
N1 in Daraga, with Mayon Volcano on the background

From Sipocot, N1 traverses the municipalities of Libmanan, Pamplona, San Fernando, and Milaor (where it is alternatively known as Mabolo Road) in Camarines Sur. N1 then enters Naga City, bypassing its poblacion as Roxas Avenue or Diversion Road before turning east at the Naga Rotonda to follow Maharlika Highway to enter Pili, the provincial capital. It then traverses the municipalities of Bula, Baao, Nabua, and Bato.

N1 enters the province of Albay at Polangui and traverses south of the Mayon Volcano. At Daraga poblacion, N1 turns sharply to the west as Rizal Street at its intersection with N630 (Rizal Avenue), which provides access to Legazpi, and becomes a zigzag road as it leaves the province.

N1 enters the province of Sorsogon at Pilar. It then enters Sorsogon City, where it cuts through the poblacion as Rizal Street and Magsaysay Street, respectively. It turns east and veers south at the Abuyog Junction, also in Sorsogon City, as it continues its course north and east of Sorsogon Bay. It then traverses the municipalities of Casiguran and Juban. It then traverses west of Mount Bulusan and enters the towns of Irosin and Matnog, where its Luzon section ends at the Port of Matnog. Motorists can board a ferry to either Allen or San Isidro in Northern Samar at the port.

=== Eastern Visayas ===
==== Samar Island ====
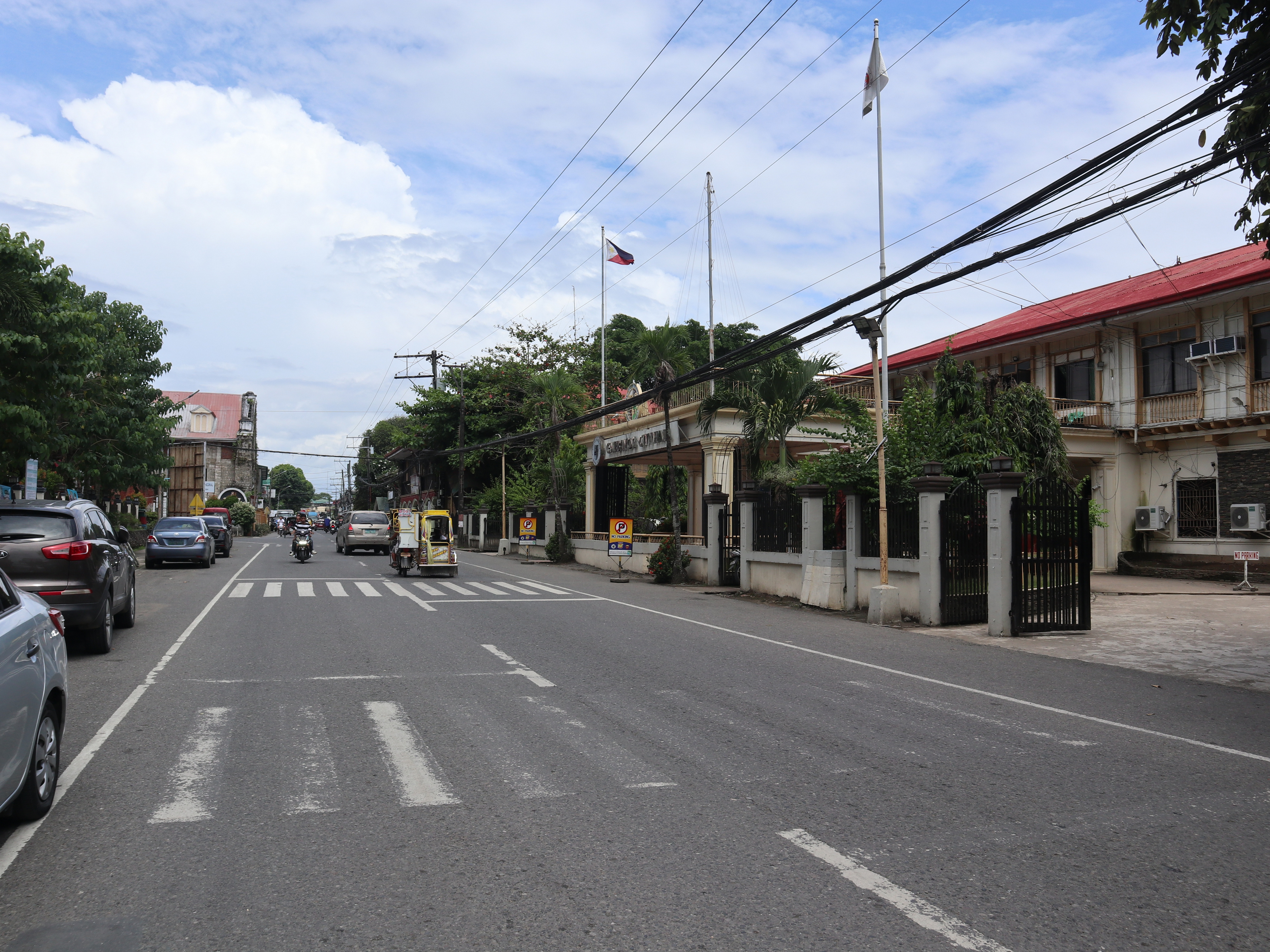
N1 as Senate President Jose Avelino Avenue in Calbayog

The Visayas section of N1 begins at the intersection with N670 (Allen–Catarman Road / Allen Diversion Road) and Allen Old Road in Allen, Northern Samar, just south of the Port of Allen. It runs mostly along the western coast of Samar Island, particularly the provinces of Northern Samar and Samar and notably through the latter's cities of Calbayog and Catbalogan. Through the Calbayog poblacion west of the Calbayog River, it is also known as Jose D. Avelino Street or Senate President Jose Avelino Avenue. In the poblacion of Santa Margarita, Samar, it briefly becomes a one-way southbound road as northbound traffic is diverted to the Santa Margarita Old Route, which covers short segments of Ramon Calagos and Barrantes Streets. It then climbs a mountainous terrain as it approaches Gandara, where it straddles along the Gandara River and Tan-Correche Creek. It then enters the landlocked town of San Jorge and returns to the western coast of Samar at Tarangnan. Further south in Catbalogan, it traverses through the poblacion along local streets such as Del Rosario Street (where it briefly splits at the junction with Mabini Avenue, in front of Saint Mary's College of Catbalogan), Curry Avenue, San Roque Street, and Rizal Avenue Extension. From Paranas, it climbs another mountainous terrain into the island. It turns west at its intersection with N670 (Dolongan–Basey Road) in Basey as it leaves the island of Samar at Santa Rita and crosses the San Juanico Strait through the San Juanico Bridge.

==== Leyte Island ====
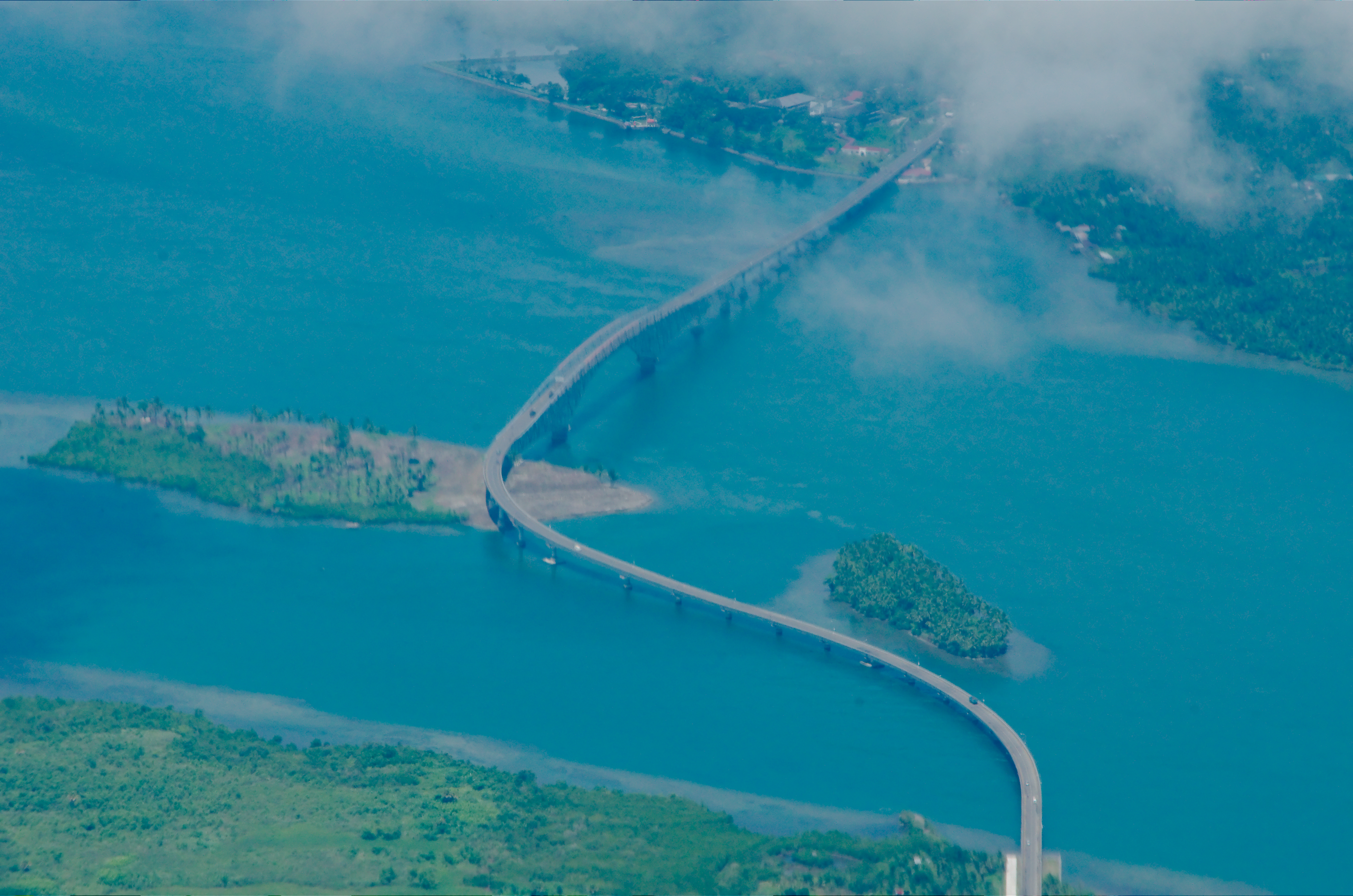
San Juanico Bridge carries N1 over the San Bernardino Strait

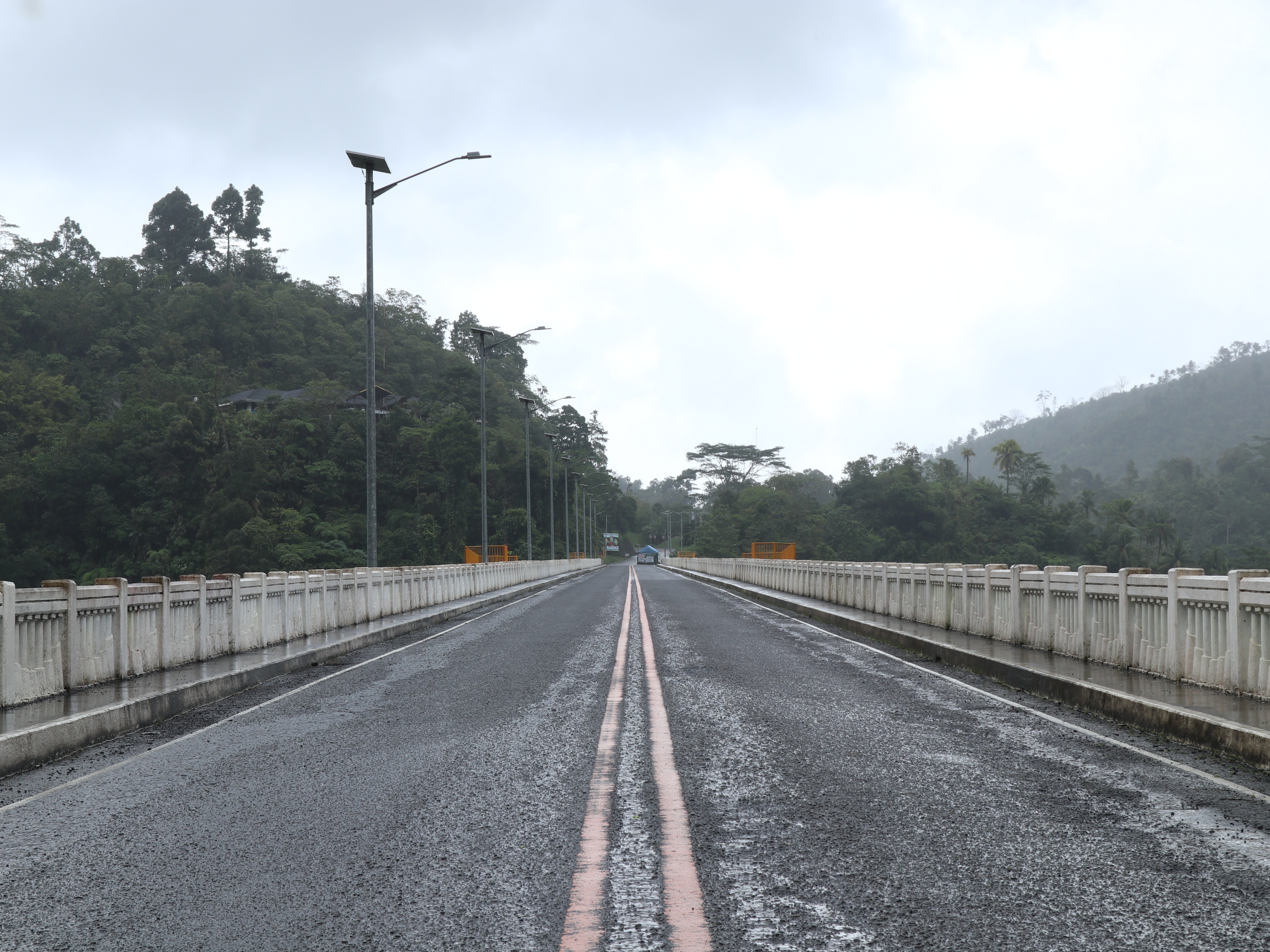
N1 on the Agas-Agas Bridge in Sogod

Past the San Juanico Bridge, N1 enters the province of Leyte at Tacloban, straddling near the eastern coast of Leyte Island. At the roundabout intersection with Naga-naga–Anibong Road, the highway traverses the southbound lane, bypassing the poblacion. It then enters Palo and turns southwest at the intersection with N686 (Tacloban–Baybay South Road / Government Center Road Network), where a monument to an unknown soldier is located.

From the Palo Junction, the road assumes the name Tacloban–Baybay South Road as it proceeds to the Palo poblacion. At its intersection with N70/AH26 (Palo–Santa Fe Road / San Salvador Street) and Pio Pedrosa Avenue at the vicinity of the Palo Cathedral, it then turns southeast to other towns at the eastern coast of Leyte. At Abuyog, it veers west, away from the poblacion, and climbs the Leyte Cordillera mountain range.

N1 enters Mahaplag, where the Tacloban–Baybay South Road diverges from the highway at the Mahaplag Triangle to continue toward the intersecting N70/AH26. It enters Southern Leyte at Sogod, where Agas-Agas Bridge is located, and descends the mountain range. It then follows the eastern coastline of Sogod Bay and enters the towns of Libagon and Liloan.

==== Panaon Island ====
In Liloan, N1 crosses the Panaon Strait through the Wawa Bridge and enters Panaon Island. There, its Visayas section ends at its intersection with N691 and the road serving the Port of Liloan, where motorists can board a ferry to Surigao City.

=== Caraga ===
Davao-Agusan National Highway
- Location: Butuan – Davao City

The Mindanao section of N1 starts at the Port of Lipata in Surigao City. It then turns south at its intersection with Surigao Wharf Road, also in Surigao City, to run parallel to the Surigao River. It enters Agusan del Norte and takes up the section Surigao–Butuan National Highway from Kitcharao to Ampayon, Butuan, where it turns southeast at its intersection with Butuan–Cagayan de Oro–Iligan Road (N9) to assume the name Davao–Agusan National Highway from thereon. It then enters Agusan del Sur, where it traverses near the Agusan Marsh Wildlife Sanctuary.

=== Davao Region ===
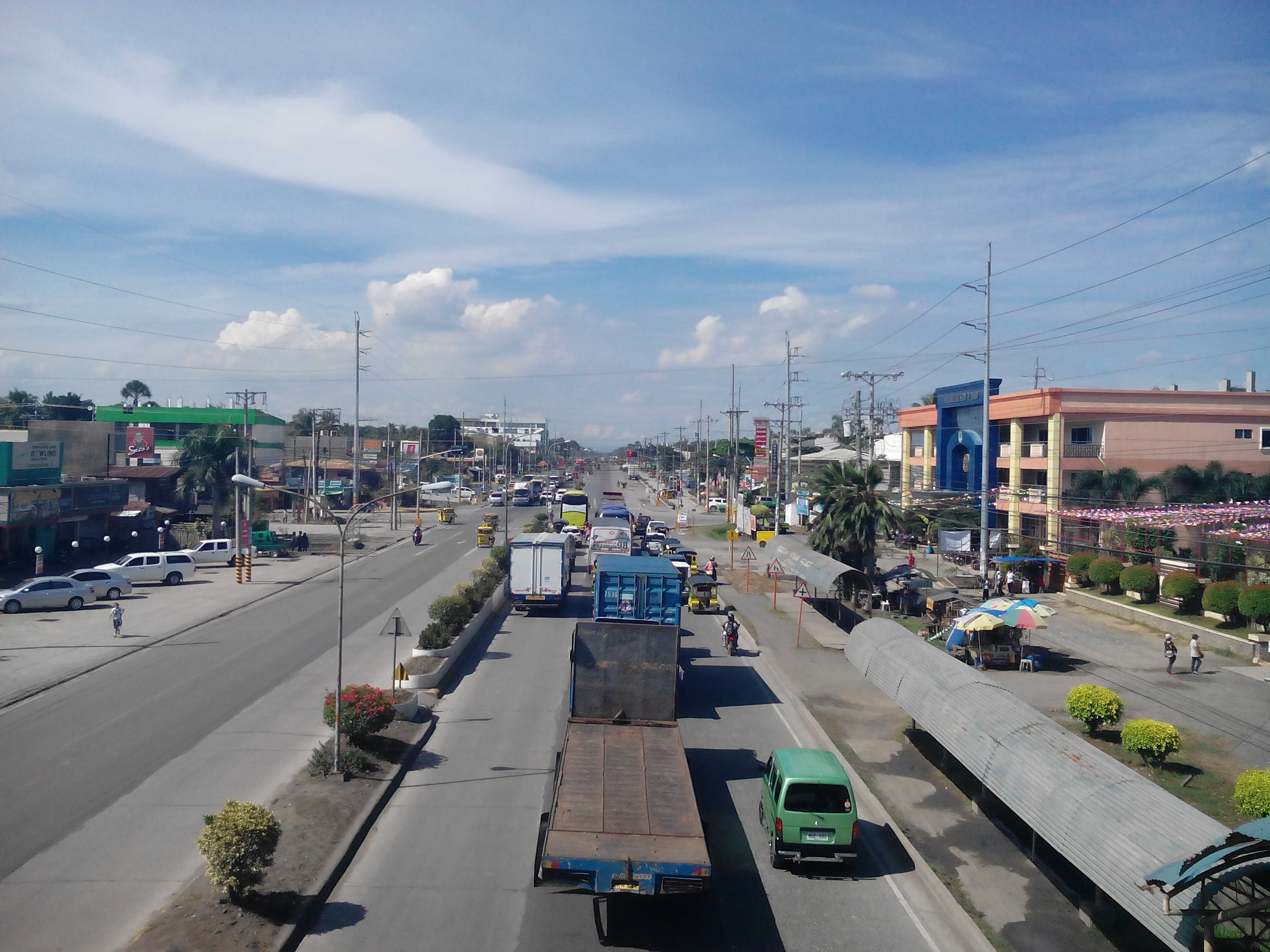
N1 in Panabo

N1 enters Davao de Oro (formerly Compostela Valley) at Monkayo and goes through mountainous terrain as it heads south towards Tagum in Davao del Norte. At the boundary of Tagum and Carmen, Davao del Norte, the highway briefly splits into two as it crosses the Libuganon River.

The route enters Panabo and Davao City, where it then follows the full length of the Carlos P. Garcia National Highway that bypass the city proper; at this junction, the AH26 designation departs from the N1 alignment to traverse the city proper via N916-5. At the southern terminus of the diversion road, N1 reunites with AH26 as it merges into the Davao-Cotabato Road, which is locally known as MacArthur Highway within Davao City. It then proceeds into Santa Cruz, Davao del Sur, traversing the municipality's eastern coastline but bypassing the municipal proper.

Digos–Makar Road
- Davao–GenSan Highway
- Location: Digos – General Santos
- Length: 91.78 km (57.03 mi)

It enters Digos, where it turns west at its intersection with N923 (Digos Diversion Road) and then south at its intersection with N75 to assume the name Digos–Makar Road or Davao–GenSan Highway as it traverses the mountainous terrains up to General Santos. In the Digos city proper, it is locally known as Rizal Avenue.

=== Soccsksargen ===
==== Malungon to Koronadal ====
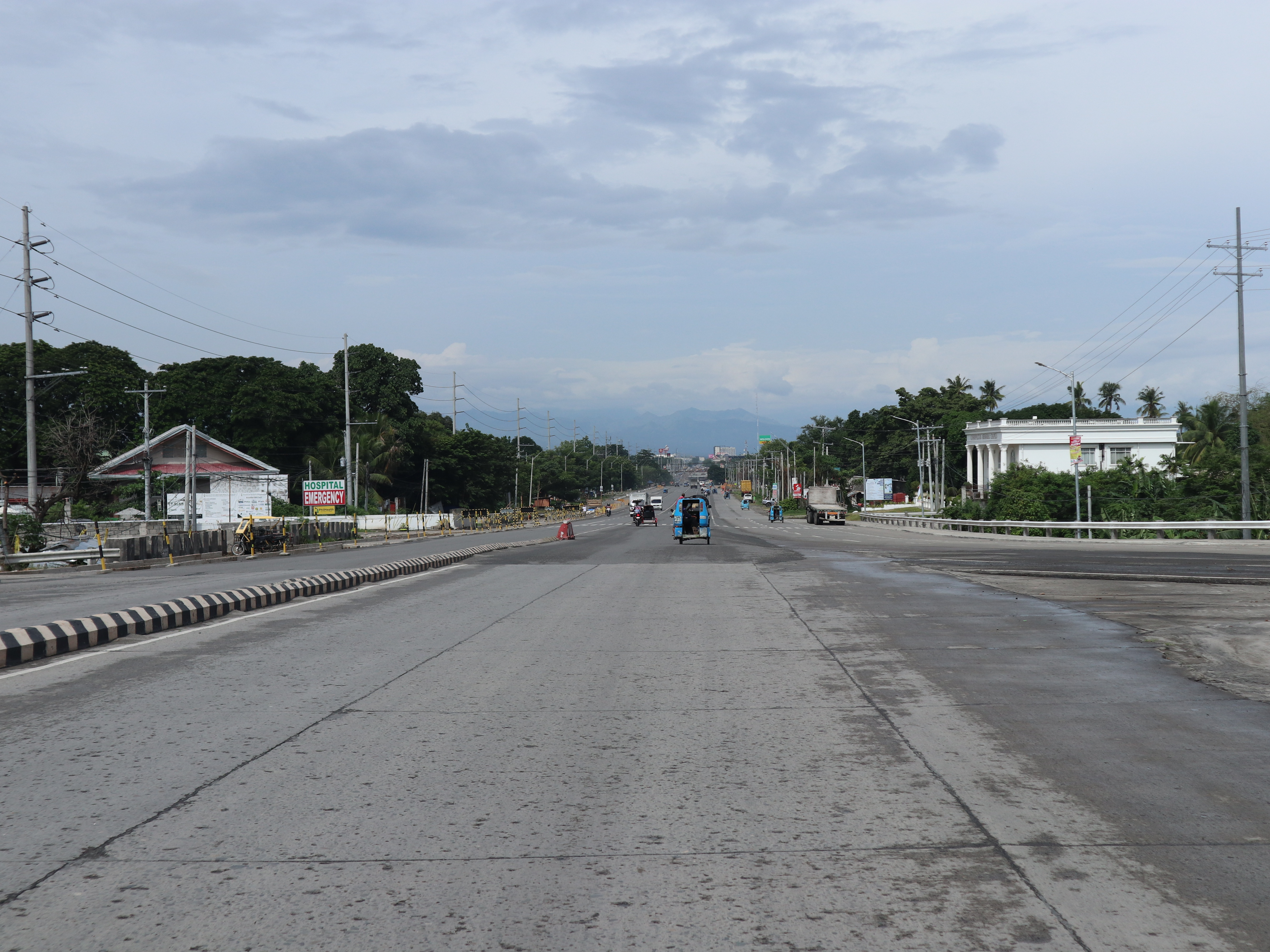
N1 as Digos–Makar Road in General Santos

N1 enters Sarangani at Malungon, where it runs parallel to Malungon River from there. At General Santos, it is locally known as Jose Catolico Sr. Avenue until turning west to pass by the poblacion.

Marbel-Makar Road
- Location: General Santos – Koronadal, South Cotabato
- Length: 20.66 km (12.84 mi)

N1 turns north at its intersection with N935 (Hadano Avenue) at Hadano Park to assume the name Marbel–Makar Road, alternately known up to Polomolok as General Santos–Polomolok National Road (GenSan–Polomolok National Road) or Polomolok National Highway.

==== Koronadal to Esperanza ====
Cotabato-Marbel Road
- Location: Koronadal, South Cotabato – Isulan, Sultan Kudarat
- Length: 51.67 km (32.11 mi)

At the Koronadal poblacion, the highway turns southwest at the Marbel Roundball, a roundabout intersection connecting N940 (Midsayap–Marbel Road) and the Koronadal–Lutayan–Columbio Road. It is locally named Rafael Alunan Avenue within the Koronadal poblacion, Banga–Koronadal City Road toward Banga, and Cotabato–Marbel Road toward Isulan. Past the Norala–Banga Road intersection in Banga, the alternative name changes to Banga–Isulan Road towards Isulan. The route then veers northwest at Surallah and enters Sultan Kudarat at Isulan, where it becomes the Marbel–Allah Valley–Cotabato Road and Isulan–Shariff Aguak Road.

=== Bangsamoro Autonomous Region ===
==== Ampatuan to Cotabato City ====
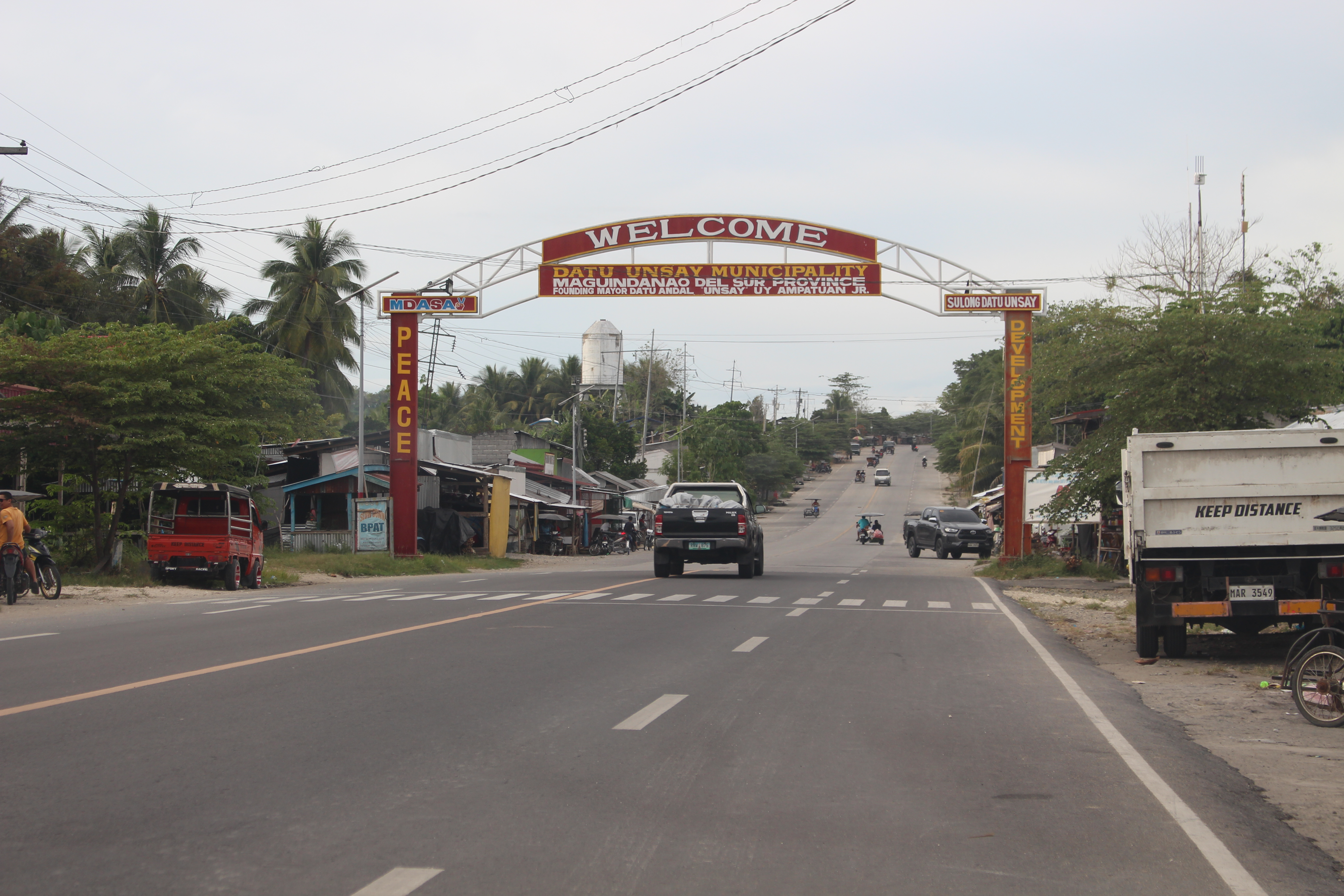
N1 as Marbel–Allah Valley–Cotabato Road at the Shariff Aguak–Datu Unsay boundary in Maguindanao del Sur

N1 enters Bangsamoro Region at Ampatuan, Maguindanao del Sur, as it crosses a river as Kakal Bridge. In Shariff Aguak, the highway transitions its alternative name from Isulan–Shariff Aguak Road to Shariff Aguak–Cotabato City Road.

It then enters Maguindanao del Norte at Talitay (Sultan Sumagka). It retains the name Marbel–Allah Valley–Cotabato Road up to Cotabato City. It enters the Cotabato City proper, where it assumes the local name Sinsuat Avenue.

==== Cotabato City to Picong ====
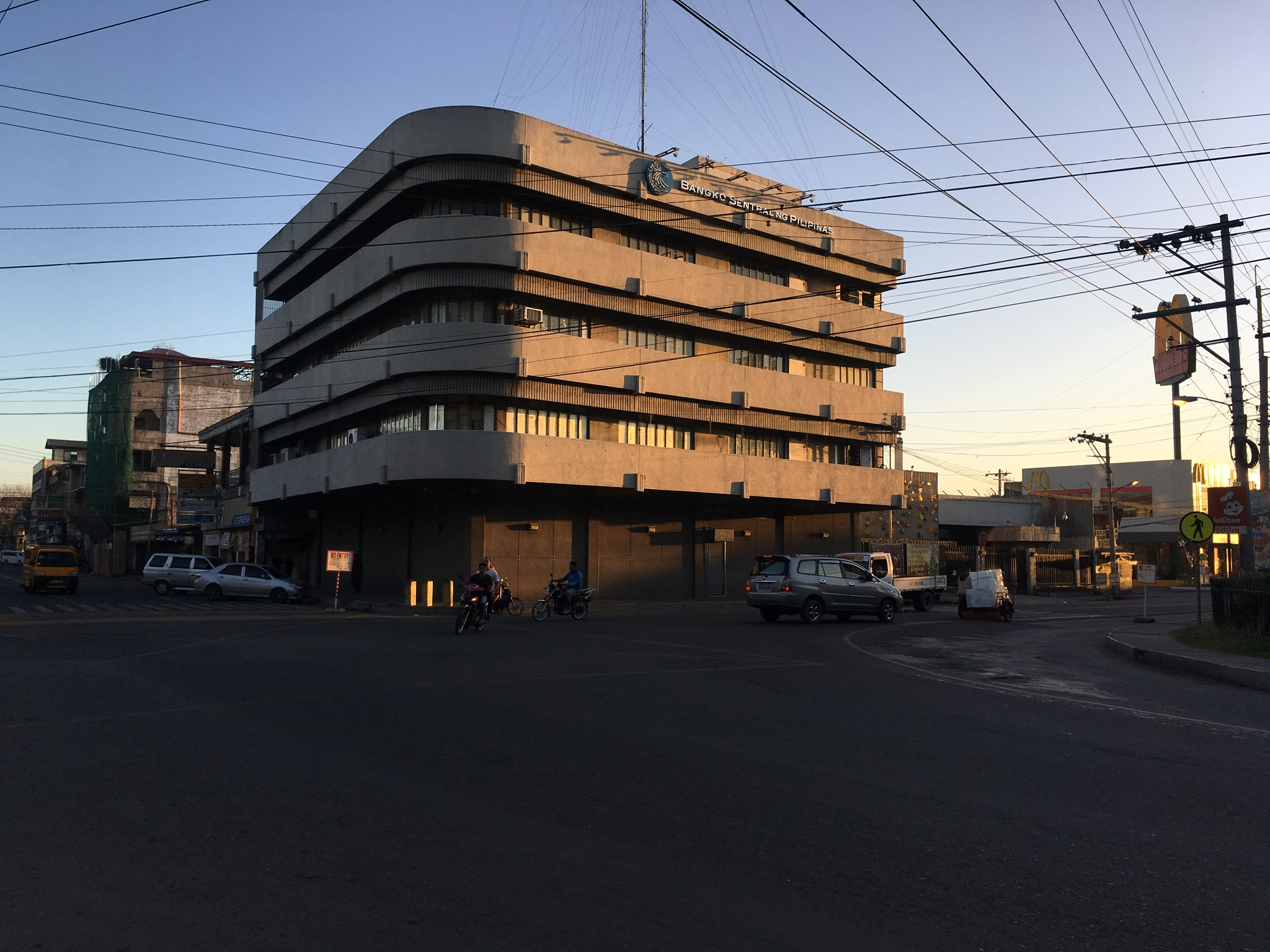
The junction in Cotabato City where N1 turns east towards Sultan Kudarat, Maguindanao del Norte. Seen here is a building of the Bangko Sentral ng Pilipinas.

At the junction of Sinsuat, Quezon, and Don Teodoro V. Juliano Avenues, N1 turns east to assume the name Cotabato–Lanao Road up to Matanog, Maguindanao del Norte; from the junction, it assmes the name Quezon Avenue up to barangay Crossing Simuay, Sultan Kudarat, Maguindanao del Norte. In Crossing Simuay, it takes the longer, circumferential path as it meets the western terminus of N75 (Davao–Cotabato Road). From Sultan Mastura to Parang, it follows the diversion road that bypasses the Sultan Mastura poblacion and the coastal barangay of Landasan in Parang. In Parang poblacion, N1 turns northeast at its intersection with Talisay Street and Rizal Avenue.

Entering Lanao del Sur at Sultan Dumalondong, N1 becomes Cotabato–Malabang–Lanao del Norte Road as it would also traverse Malabang. In Balabagan, it assumes the alternate name Rizal Avenue as it approaches near the coast of Lanao del Sur with Celebes Sea up to Picong, the last municipality traversed by N1 before leaving Bangsamoro.

N1's section from Sultan Kudarat, Maguindanao del Norte, to Balabagan, Lanao del Sur, is also known as Narciso Ramos Highway.

=== Northern Mindanao ===
N1 enters Lanao del Norte at Sultan Naga Dimaporo, the only municipality it passes through in Northern Mindanao. It traverses along the southern coast of the province. Within the region and province, it is alternatively known as Malabang–Dobleston–Tukuran Road as it traverses Barangay Dabliston.

=== Zamboanga Peninsula ===
Lanao-Pagadian-Zamboanga City Road Pagadian City-Zamboanga City Road
- Location: Tukuran, Zamboanga del Sur – Zamboanga City

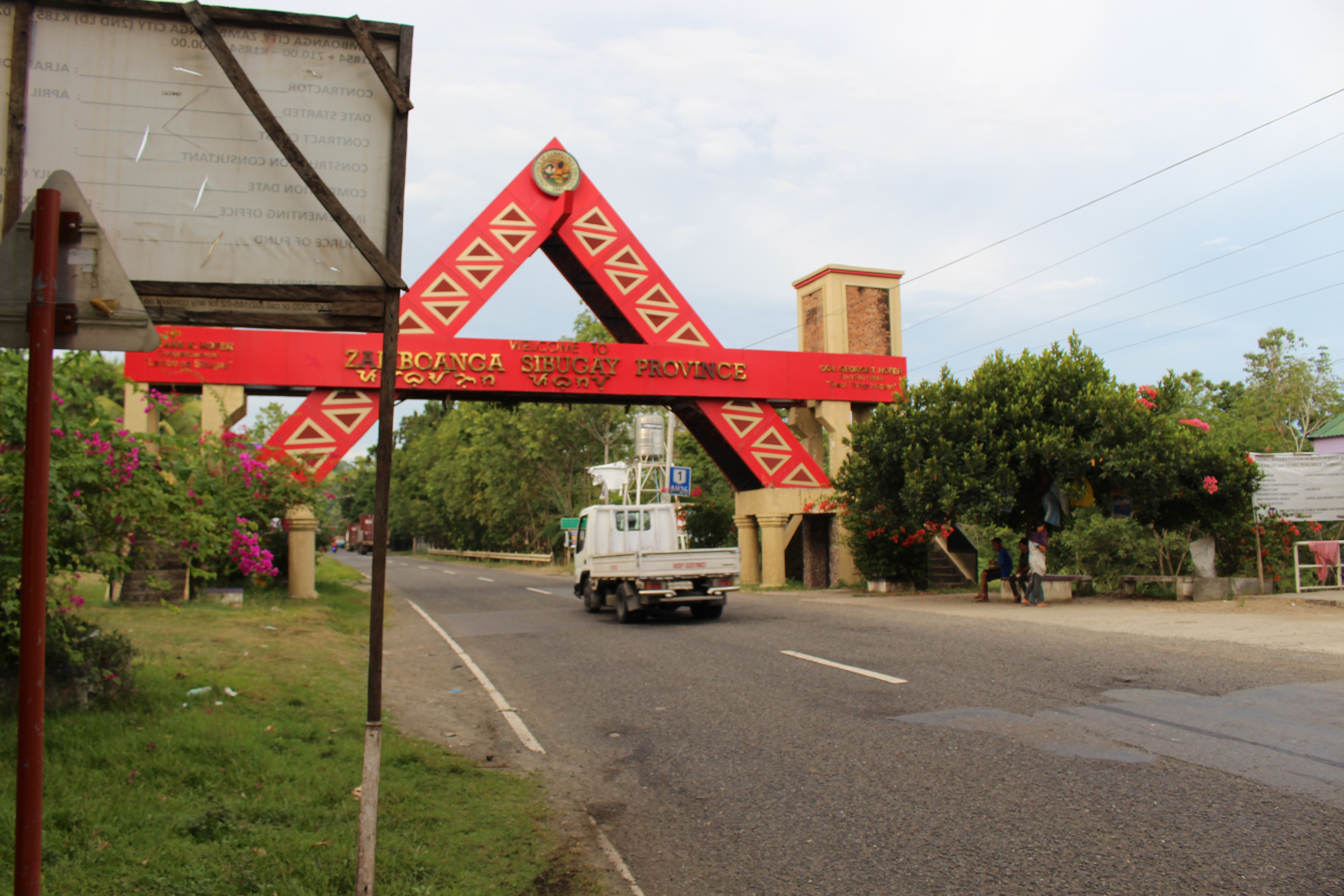
A welcome sign at the Zamboanga Sibugay–Zamboanga City boundary

N1 enters Zamboanga del Sur at Tukuran, where it becomes alternatively known as Tucuran Junction–Karomatan Junction Road or Malabang–Tukuran Road as it approaches the poblacion, where it veers away from the province's coast along Pagadian Bay at the Tukuran poblacion, where it is locally known as Rizal Avenue. At the Tukuran Junction, it turns west and becomes Lanao–Pagadian–Zamboanga City Road and Pagadian City–Zamboanga City Road from thereon. It climbs the mountainous terrain and turns west at its intersection with N9 (Butuan–Cagayan de Oro–Iligan Road) to become alternatively known as National Highway. It then cuts through Pagadian, where it is a principal route locally known as J.P. Rizal Avenue through the poblacion. It enters Zamboanga Sibugay, passing through the mountainous terrain and municipalities on the province's southern coast.

N1 enters Zamboanga City as Maria Clara L. Lobregat Highway. It then enters the city proper, where it turns south as Veterans Avenue at the Sta. Cruz Junction, then southwest as Governor Lim Avenue, which carries one-way northeast-bound traffic, and finally southwest as Don Pablo Lorenzo Street. It ends at the intersection with N970 (N.S. Valderosa Street), N966 (Zamboanga City-Labuan-Limpapa Road/J.S. Alano Street/Calle Guardia Nacional), and N971 (Wharf Road/Don Pablo Lorenzo Street), its physical continuation towards the Port of Zamboanga. This junction is situated near the Zamboanga City Hall, the city's Rizal Park, and the Universidad de Zamboanga - City Campus.

== History ==
The current alignment of N1 was formed by the integration and expansion of several colonial-era and post-war highway systems. Its direct predecessors included:

- Segments of Highway 3 (Manila North Road) from Laoag to Aparri and from Pulilan to Caloocan
- Majority of Highway 5 (Cagayan Valley Road) from Lal-lo to Pulilan
- Highway 54 (present-day EDSA) then in Rizal
- Majority of Highway 1 (Manila South Road) from Muntinlupa to Matnog, including the Calamba–Santo Tomas segment of the Manila–Batangas Road
- Highway 1 as Samar–Leyte Road from Calbayog to Santa Rita and as Leyte–Samar Road from Tacloban to Mahaplag and from Sogod to Liloan.
- Highway 1 as Agusan–Surigao Road in the old Surigao and Agusan provinces, Agusan–Davao Road in the old Agusan and Davao provinces, and as Davao–Cotabato Road from Davao City to Digos
- Highway 5 (Lanao–Cotabato Road) from Dadiangas (present-day General Santos) to Mamasapano
- Highway 1 (Cotabato–Lanao Road) from Sultan Kudarat to Malabang
- Lanao–Zamboanga Road

More roads were later constructed and added to integrate with the present alignment of N1 and Pan-Philippine Highway (also known as Maharlika Highway since 1979), which was conceived in 1965 as the country's principal transport backbone and later designated as Asian Highway 26 (AH26).

In 2014, the Department of Public Works and Highways assigned the segment of Pan-Philippine Highway from Laoag to Guiguinto and from Calamba to Zamboanga City, MacArthur Highway from Guiguinto to Caloocan, EDSA, and Manila South Road from Muntinlupa to Calamba as N1. The route was later realigned through newer bypass routes. It shifted from the original Simuay–Landasan–Parang Road (now N937) to a new bypass between Parang and Sultan Mastura in present-day Maguindanao del Norte, whereas, in 2025, the segment in Davao City was shifted from the Davao–Agusan and eastern Davao–Cotabato roads in the city proper to the Carlos P. Garcia National Highway (formerly N913). The Pan-Philippine Highway designation, however, remained through the Davao City proper routes redesignated as N916-5.

== Junctions ==
=== Luzon ===
==== Laoag to Pasay ====
Ilocos Norte

- N2 / N100 in Laoag. Northern terminus of Laoag–Pasay section.
- N122 in Bacarra

Cagayan

- N223 in Abulug
- N121 in Abulug
- N101 / N119 at Magapit Interchange, Lal-lo
- N104 in Tuguegarao
- N105 in Tuguegarao
- N51 / N106 in Tuguegarao
- N104 in Tuguegarao

Isabela

- N220-1 in Cabagan (northern terminus)
- N220 in Cabagan
- N220-1 in Cabagan (southern terminus)
- N220-1 in Tumauini
- N53 in Cauayan
- N51 in Santiago
- N108-1 in Santiago
- N108 in Cordon

Nueva Vizcaya

- N109 in Bagabag
- N110 in Aritao
- N114 in Santa Fe

Nueva Ecija

- N56 / N111 in San Jose
- N114 in Santo Domingo
- N111 in Cabanatuan
- N58 in Santa Rosa
- N3 in Gapan

Bulacan

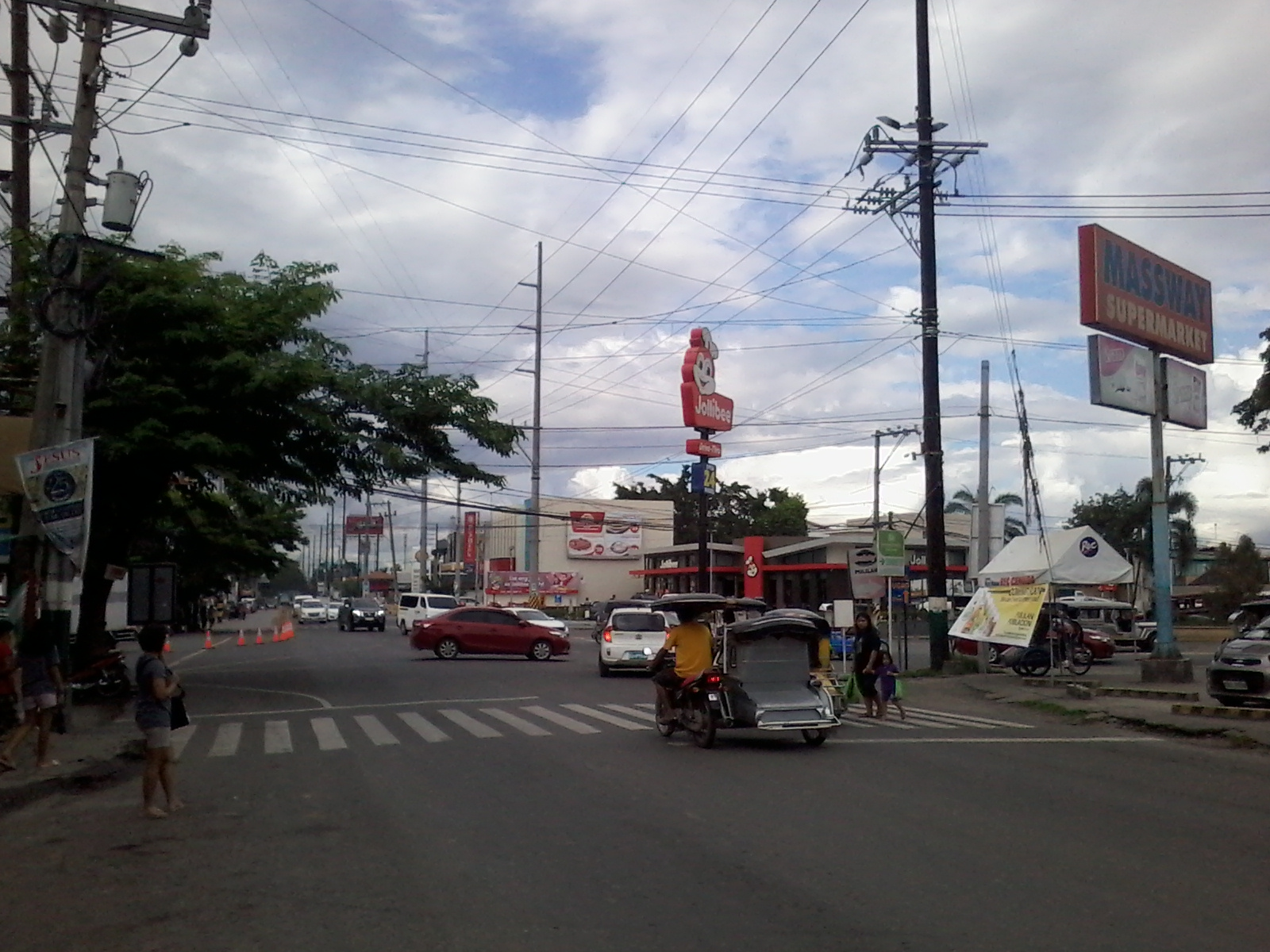
The intersection of Doña Remedios Trinidad Highway (N1/AH26) and Pulilan Regional Road (N115) in Pulilan.

- N247 in San Rafael
- N115 in Pulilan
- N116 in Plaridel
- AH 26 (E1) / E1 in Santa Rita, Guiguinto. End of AH26 concurrency.
- E1 / N2 in Tabang, Guiguinto
- N117 in Meycauayan

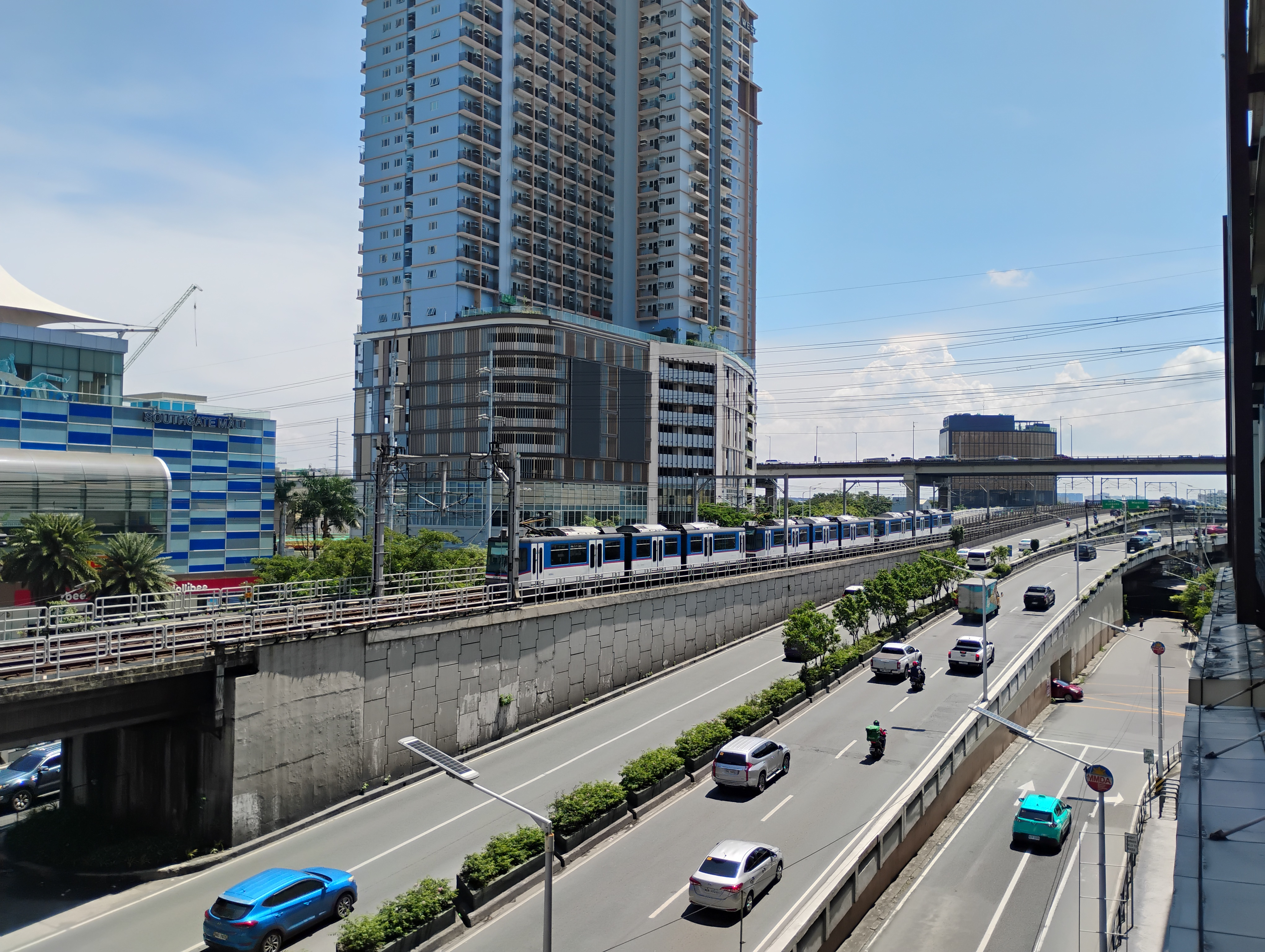
Magallanes Interchange in Makati

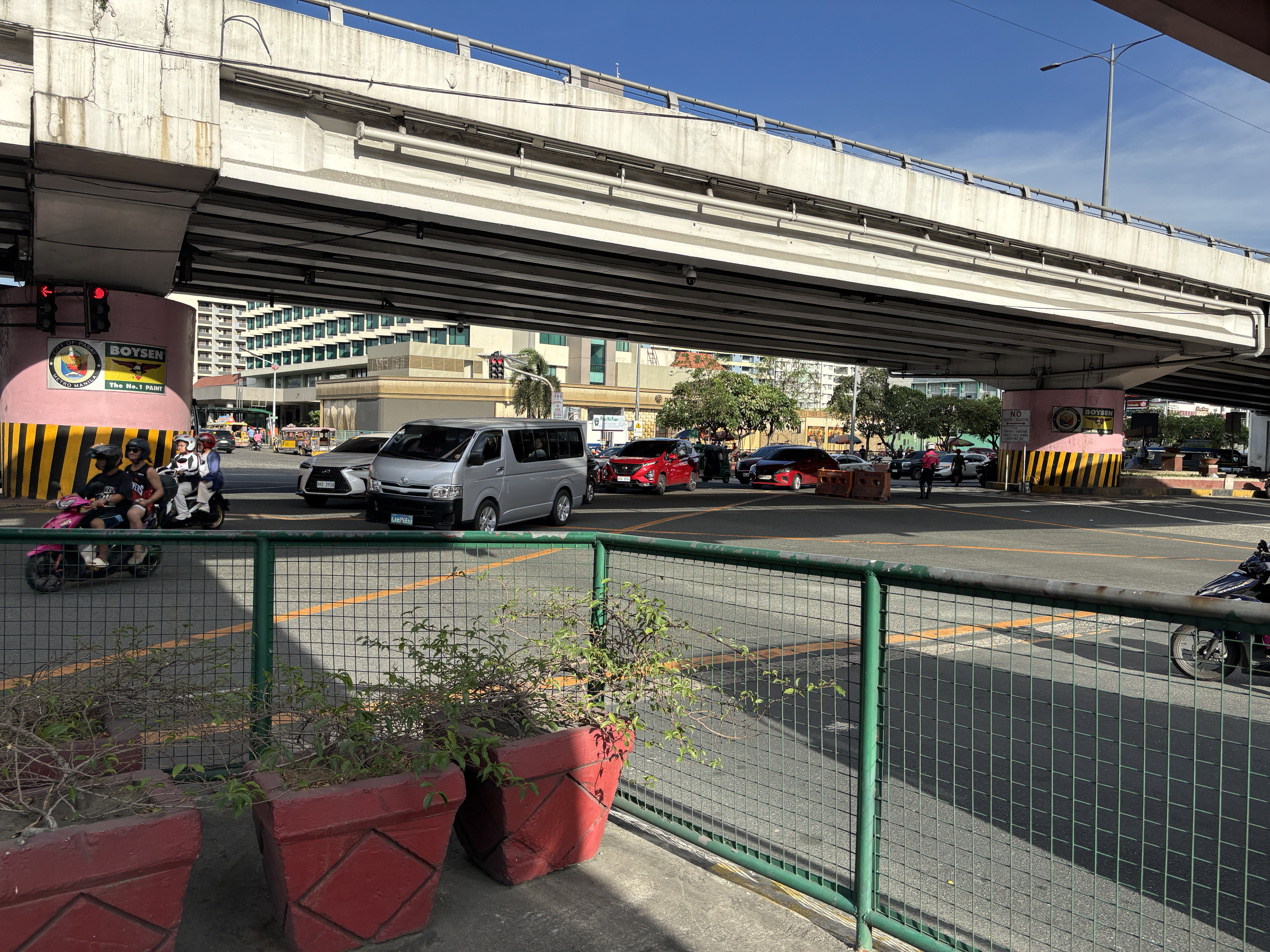
The intersection of EDSA (N1/AH26) and Roxas Boulevard (N120/AH26 / N61) in Pasay is the southern end of N1's Laoag–Pasay section.

Metro Manila

- N118 in Malinta, Valenzuela
- E5 in Karuhatan, Valenzuela
- N150 / AH 26 (N120) in Caloocan. Start of AH26 concurrency.
- AH 26 (E1) / N160 at Balintawak Interchange, Quezon City
- N127 in Unang Sigaw, Quezon City
- N129 in Muñoz, Quezon City
- N171 / N173 in Diliman, Quezon City
- N170 in Diliman, Quezon City
- N172 / N174 in Diliman, Quezon City
- N180 / N59 in Cubao, Quezon City
- N185 near Camp Aguinaldo, Quezon City
- N184 / N60 in Quezon City and Mandaluyong
- N141 in Mandaluyong
- N190 in Makati
- N191 in Makati
- N190 in Makati
- N145 / AH 26 (E2) at Magallanes Interchange, Makati
- N171 in Pasay
- N170 in Pasay
- N61 / AH 26 (N120) in Pasay. Southern terminus of Laoag–Pasay section.

==== Muntinlupa to Matnog ====
Metro Manila

- N411 / N142 in Alabang, Muntinlupa. Northern terminus of Muntinlupa–Matnog section.
- N411 in Alabang, Muntinlupa
- AH 26 (E2) in Alabang, Muntinlupa

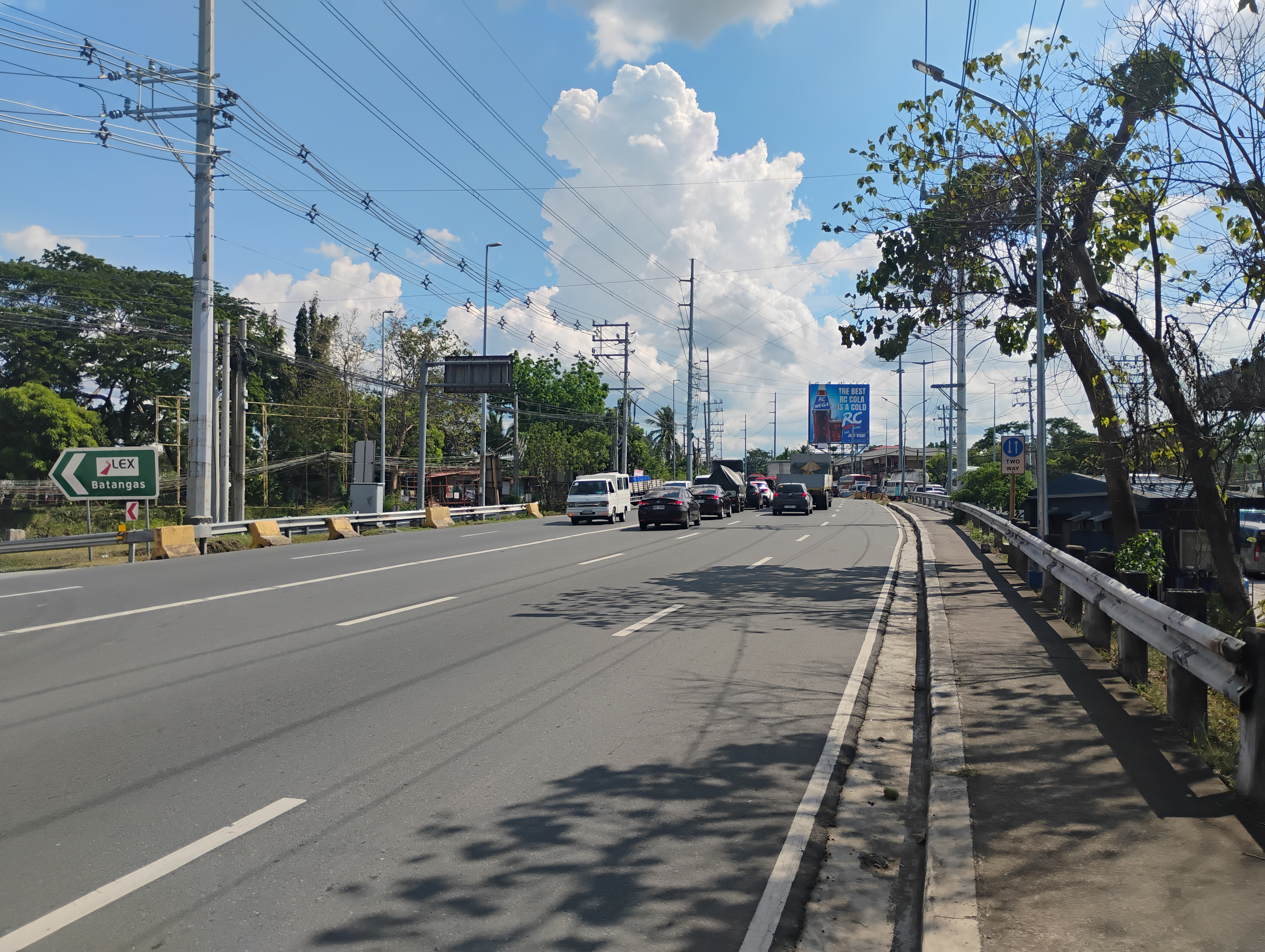
Calamba (Turbina–Real) Interchange in Calamba, Laguna is the start of the AH26 concurrency on N1's section south of Manila.

Laguna (1st segment)

- N65 in Biñan
- N420 in Santa Rosa
- N420-1 in Calamba
- N66 in Calamba
- N420-2 in Calamba
- AH 26 (E2) / E2 in Calamba. Start of AH26 concurrency.

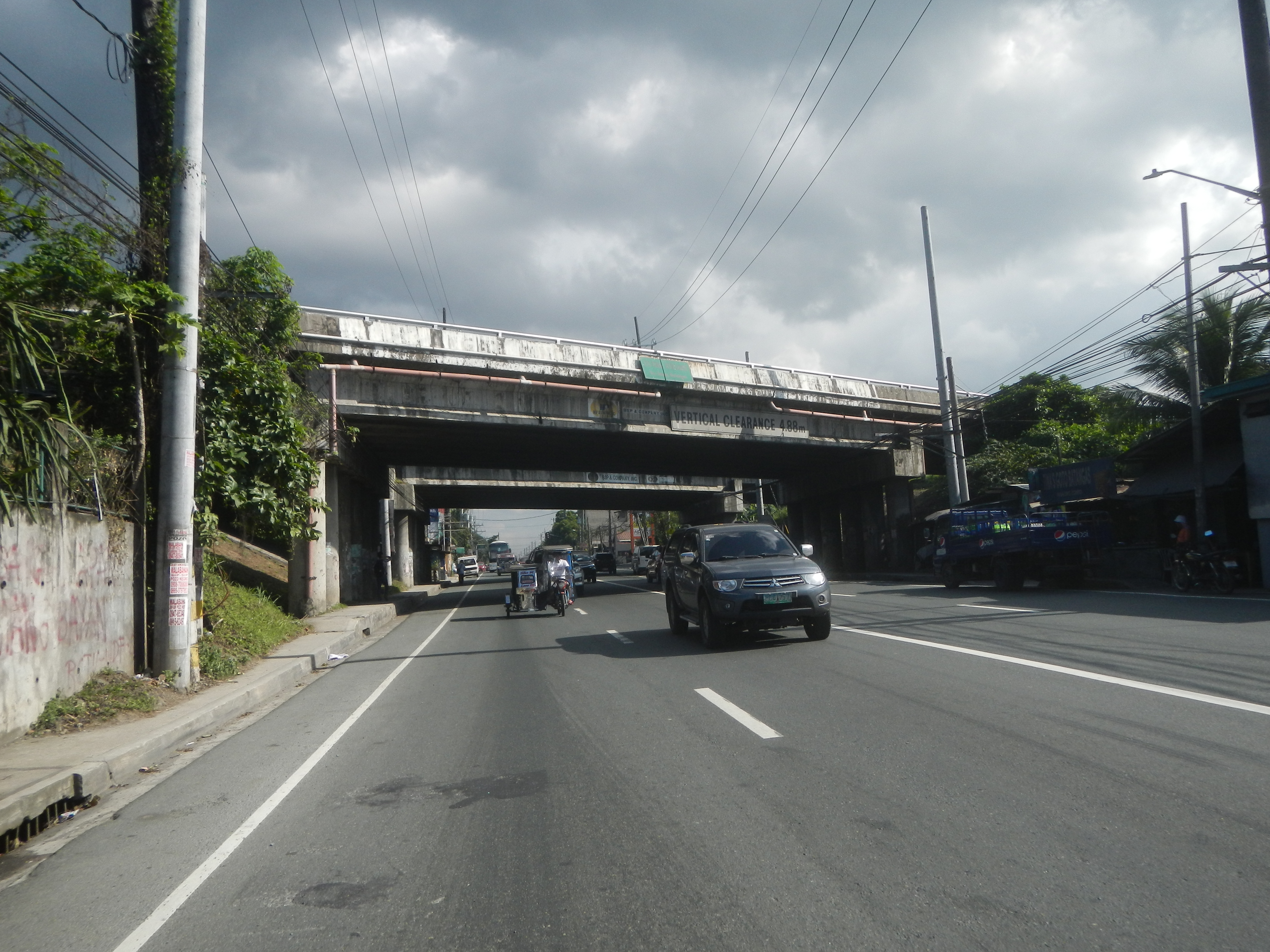
N1 crossing beneath the STAR Tollway (E2) at Santo Tomas Interchange, Santo Tomas, Batangas

Batangas

- E2 in Santo Tomas
- N421-2 in Santo Tomas (northern terminus)
- N4 / N421-2 in Santo Tomas

Laguna (2nd segment)

- N421-1 in Alaminos (two eastern termini)
- N67 in San Pablo (two southern termini)
- N608-1 in San Pablo

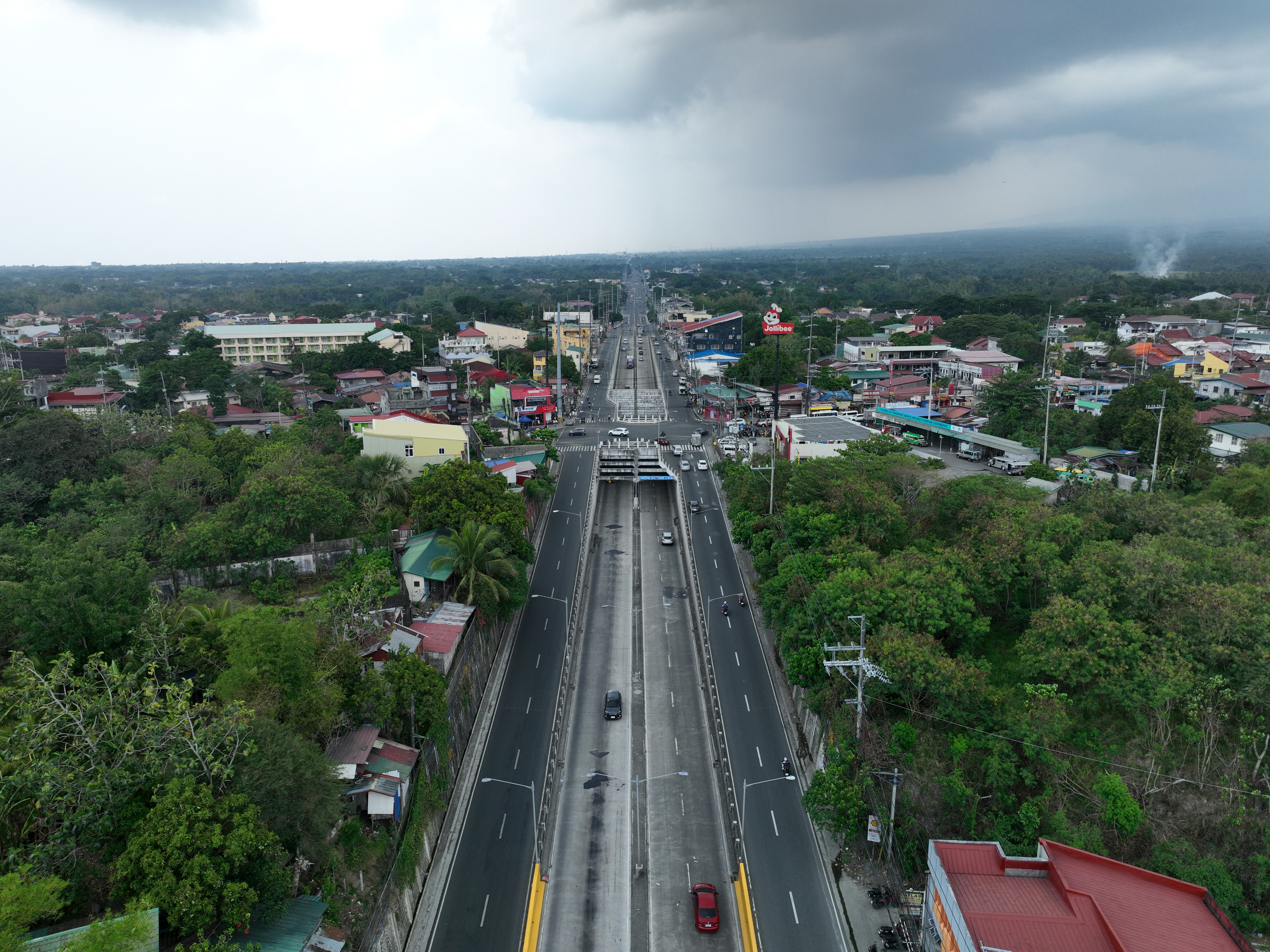
The intersection of Lucena Diversion Road (N1/AH26) and Tayabas–Lucena Road (N603) in Lucena, Quezon

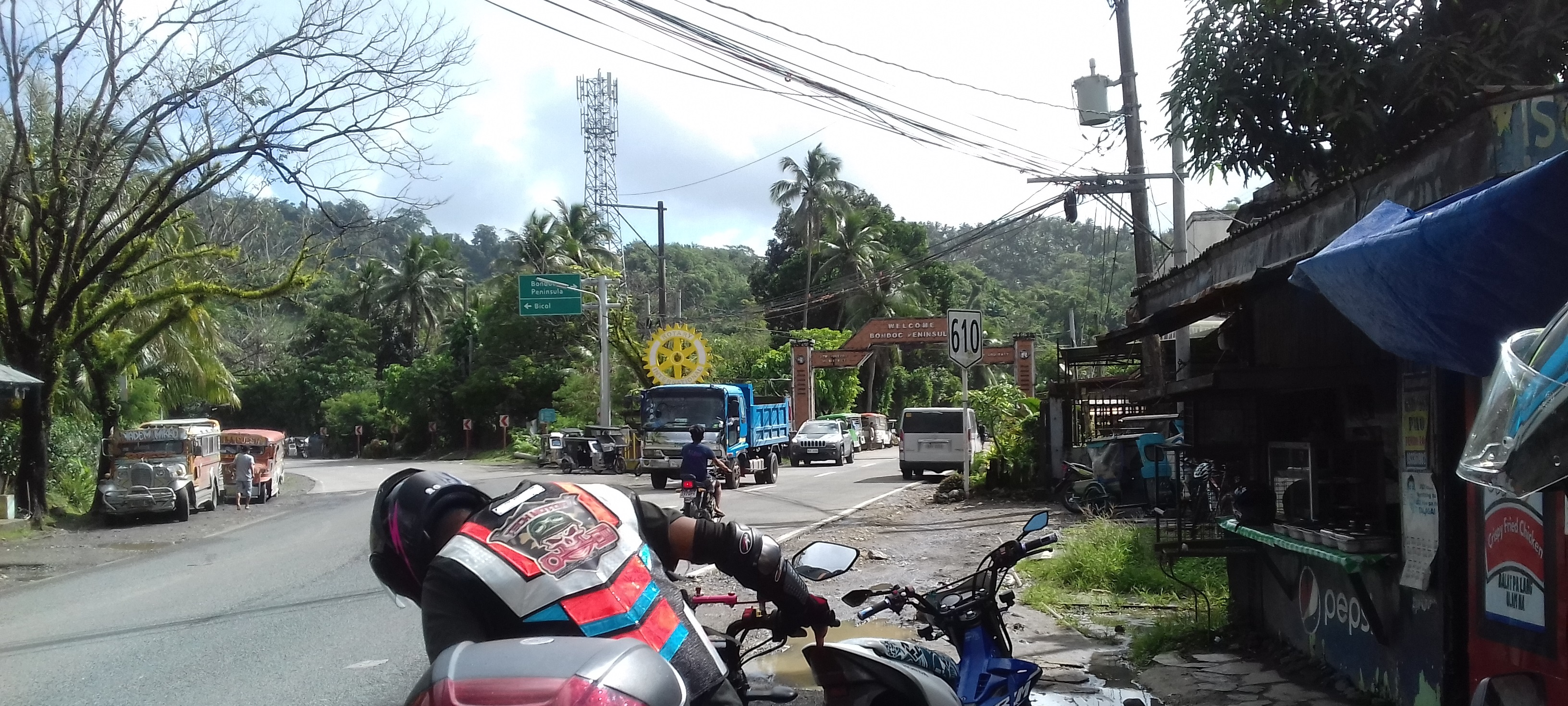
The intersection of Maharlika Highway (N1/AH26) and Pagbilao–Padre Burgos Road (N610) in Pagbilao, Quezon

Quezon

- N608-1 in Tiaong
- N608 in Tiaong (northern terminus)
- N435 in Tiaong
- N608 in Tiaong (southern terminus)
- N609 in Candelaria
- N422-1 in Candelaria
- N609 in Candelaria
- N606 in Sariaya
- N606 in Isabang, Tayabas
- N422 in Isabang, Lucena
- N603 in Gulang-Gulang, Lucena
- N606 in Talipan, Pagbilao
- N610 in Silangang Malicboy, Pagbilao
- N613-2 in Atimonan
- N618-1 in Gumaca (western terminus)
- N613 in Gumaca
- N618-1 in Gumaca (eastern terminus)
- N612-1 in Lopez (western terminus)
- N611 in Lopez
- N612 in Lopez
- N612-1 in Lopez (eastern terminus)
- N657 in Lopez

Camarines Norte

- N68 in Santa Elena
- N620 in Labo
- N621 in Daet (northern & southern termini)

Camarines Sur

- N625 in Lupi
- N626 in Lupi
- N68 in Sipocot
- N623 in Pamplona
- N627 in San Fernando
- N672 in Pili
- N673 in Pili
- N630 in Pili
- N634 in Baao
- N634 in Nabua
- N635 in Bato

Albay

- N638 in Polangui (two northern termini)
- N639 in Ligao
- N636 in Ligao
- N630 in Daraga

Sorsogon

- N642 in Pilar
- N641 in Castilla
- N643 in Sorsogon City (western terminus)
- N644 in Sorsogon City
- N643 in Sorsogon City (eastern terminus)
- N645 in Bulan

=== Visayas ===
Northern Samar

- N670 in Allen. Northern terminus of Visayas section.

Samar

- N672 in Calbayog
- N673 in Calbayog
- N679 in Calbayog (western & eastern termini)
- N677 in Gandara (northern & southern termini)
- N675 in Catbalogan
- N674 in Paranas
- N670 in Basey
- N670 in Santa Rita

Leyte

- N717 in Tacloban (northern terminus)
- N686 in Tacloban
- N687 in Tacloban
- N717 in Tacloban (southern terminus)
- N718 in Palo
- N686 in Palo
- N70 in Palo
- N719 in Palo
- N690 in Abuyog
- N70 in Mahaplag

Southern Leyte

- N692 in Sogod
- N690 in Liloan
- N691 in Liloan. Southern terminus of Visayas section.

=== Mindanao ===
Surigao del Norte

- N901 in Surigao City
- N902 in Placer

Agusan del Norte

- N9 in Butuan
- N951 in Butuan

Agusan del Sur

- N903 in Prosperidad
- N904 in Prosperidad
- N905 in San Francisco
- N904 / N73 in Trento

Davao de Oro

- N906 in Montevista
- N907 in Nabunturan

Davao del Norte

- N908 in Tagum (northern terminus)
- N909 / N74 in Tagum
- N908 in Tagum (southern terminus)
- N910 in Carmen
- N909 in Panabo

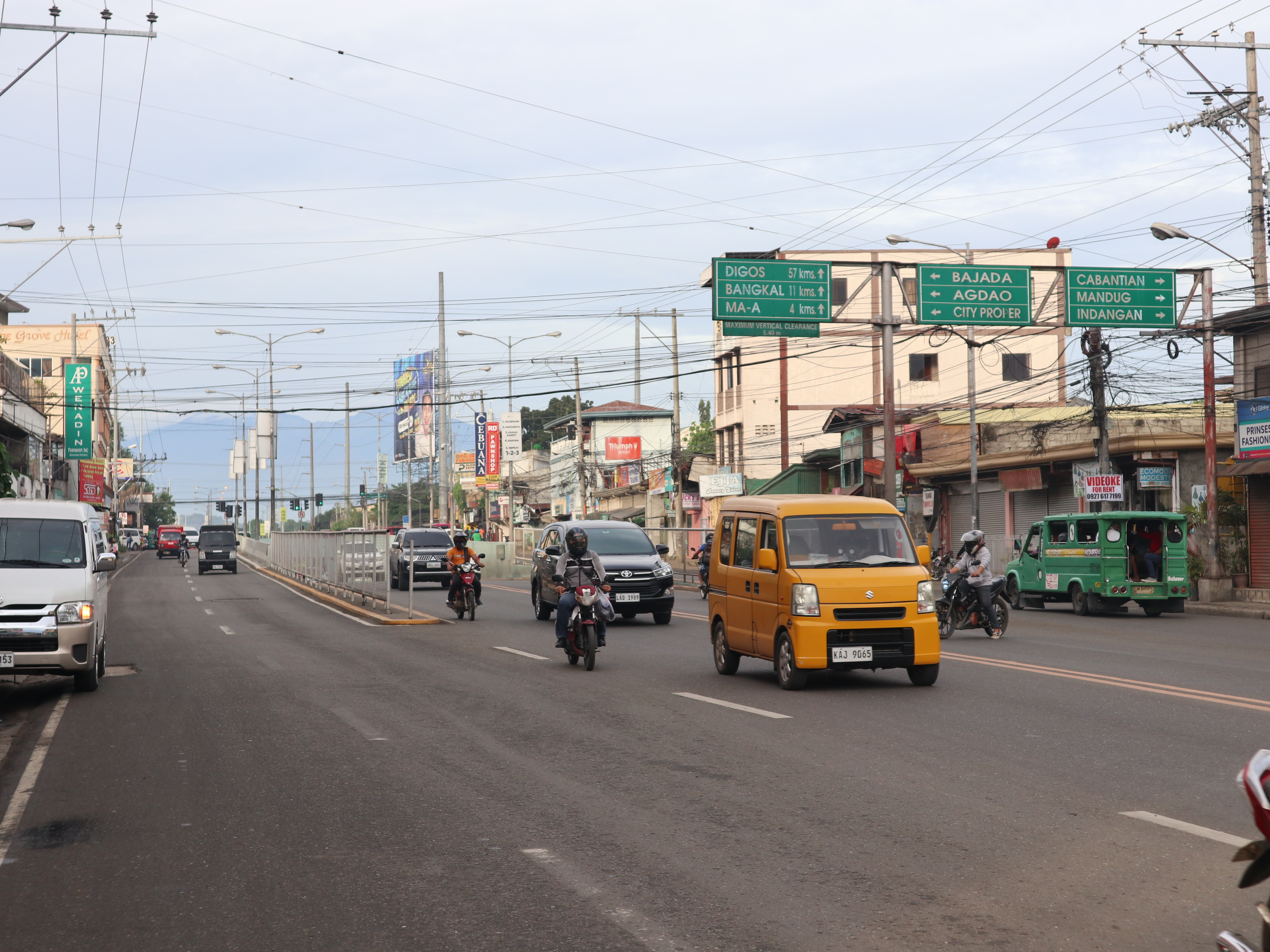
Buhangin Underpass along N1/AH26 (Carlos P. Garcia National Highway) at the intersection with N918 (Buhangin–Lapanday Road) in Davao City

Davao del Sur

- N918-1 in Davao City
- AH 26 (N916-5) in Davao City (eastern terminus). End of AH26 concurrency.
- N915-1 in Davao City
- N918 in Davao City
- N921 in Davao City
- AH 26 (N916-5) in Davao City (western terminus). Start of AH26 concurrency.
- AH 26 (N10) in Davao City
- N916-1 in Davao City
- N923 in Digos (northern terminus)
- N75 in Digos
- N924 in Digos
- N923 in Hagonoy (southern terminus)
- N930 in Sulop

South Cotabato

- N931 in General Santos (eastern terminus)
- N930 in General Santos
- N935 in General Santos
- N931 in General Santos

Sultan Kudarat

- N940 in Tacurong
- N932 in Surallah
- N76 in Isulan
- N941 in Esperanza

Maguindanao del Sur

- N933 in Datu Saudi Ampatuan

Maguindanao del Norte

- N75 in Sultan Kudarat
- N935 in Datu Odin Sinsuat
- N936 in Datu Odin Sinsuat
- N937 in Sultan Mastura
- N937 in Parang
- N939 in Parang

Lanao del Sur

- N77 in Malabang

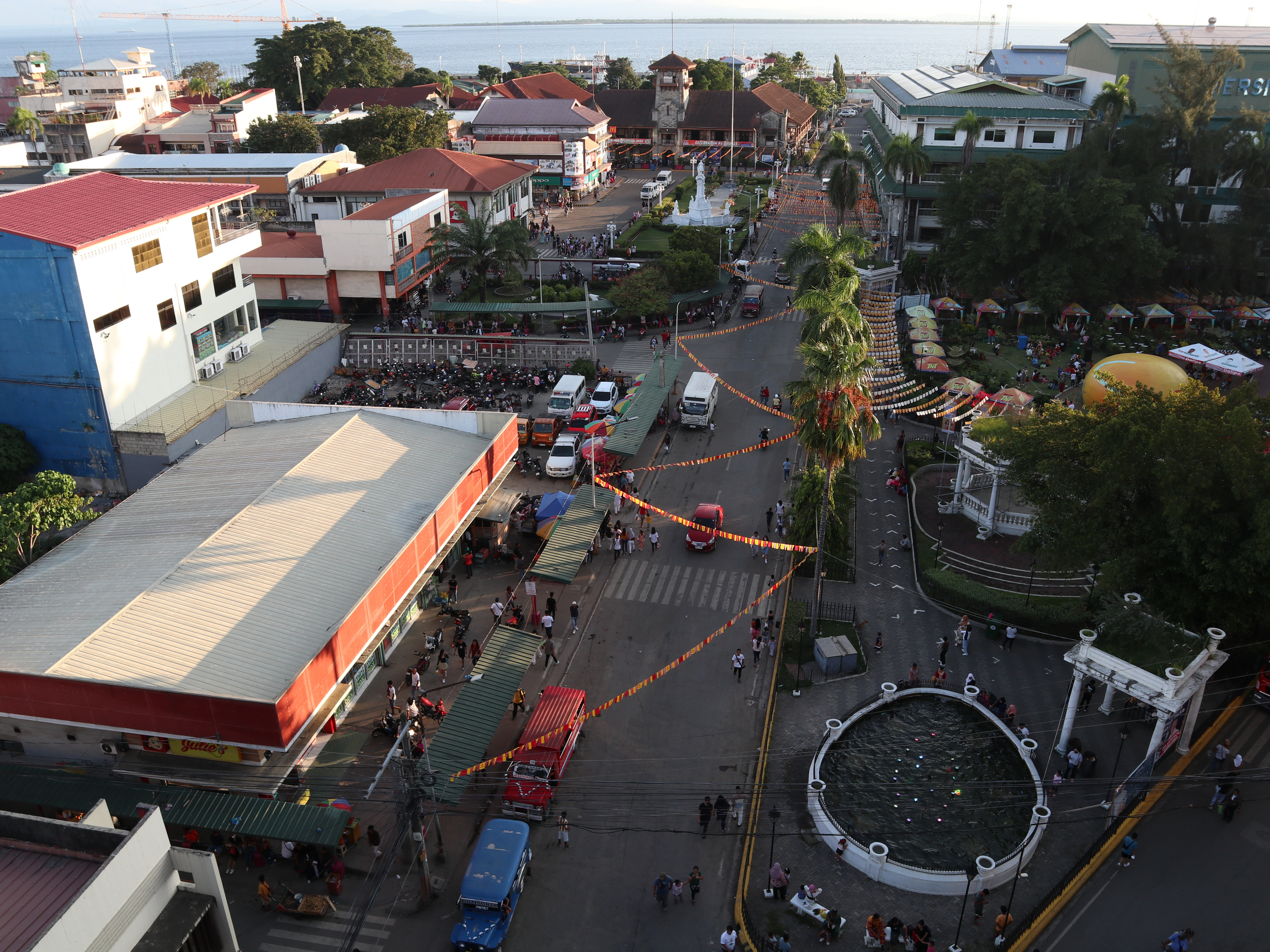
Aerial view of AH26 towards its southern terminus in Zamboanga City

Zamboanga del Sur

- N78 in Labangan
- N965-1 in Pagadian
- N965-2 in Pagadian
- N961-4 in Dumalinao
- N961-1 in Tigbao

Zamboanga Sibugay

- N961-2 in Diplahan
- N961-1 in Imelda (two separate segments)
- N79 in Ipil

Zamboanga City

- N972
- N968
- N966 / N970 / N971. Southern terminus of AH26.
