= Tagum City Flyover =

Flyover in Tagum, Davao del Norte, Philippines

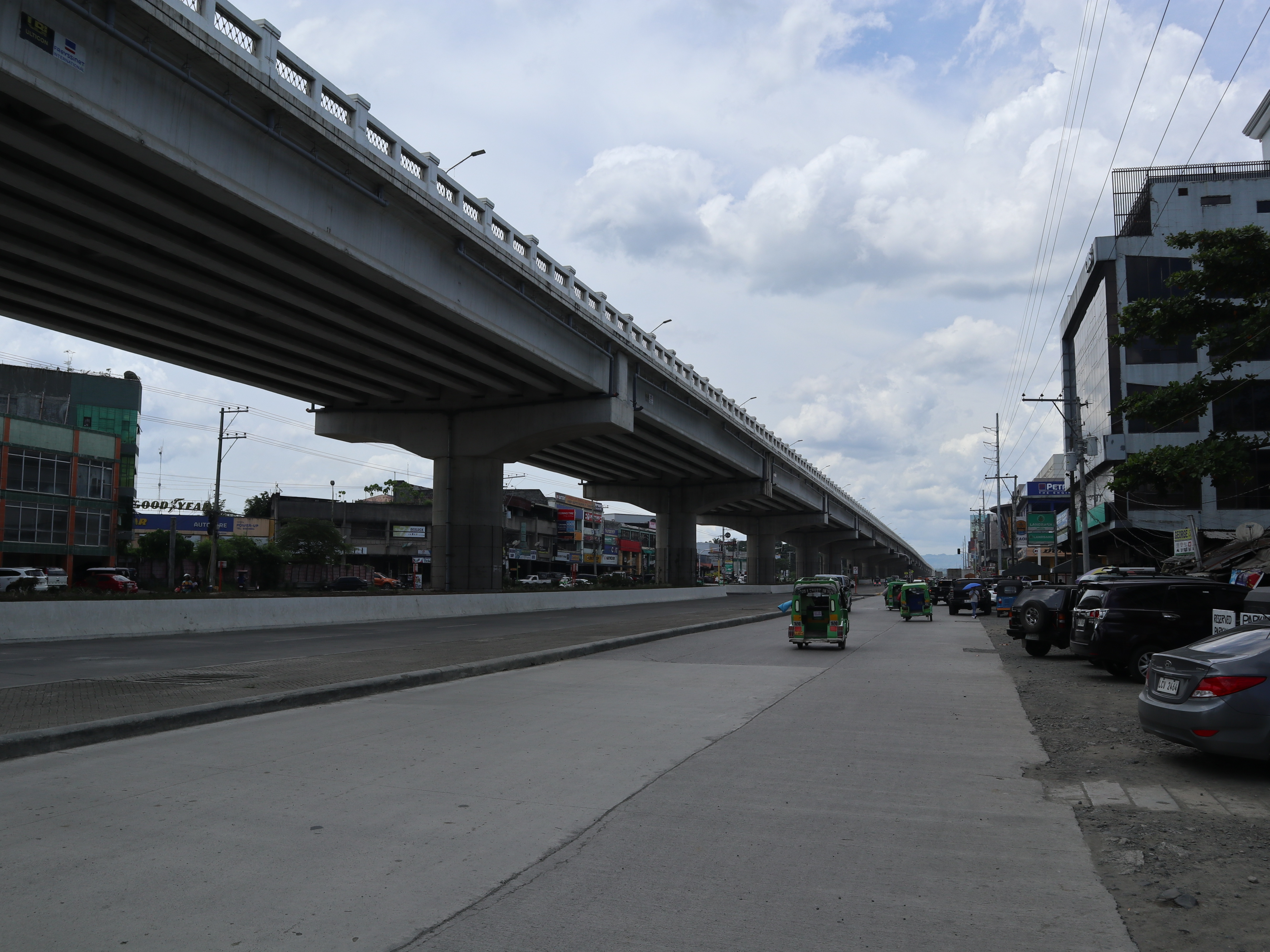
- The flyover from street level in 2023
- Carries: AH 26 (N1) (Pan-Philippine Highway)
- Locale: Tagum, Davao del Norte, Philippines
- Maintained by: Department of Public Works and Highways

Characteristics
- Total length: 1.035 km (0.643 mi)

History
- Construction start: November 2017
- Construction cost: ₱2.6 billion
- Opened: October 4, 2021
- Inaugurated: November 20, 2021

The Tagum City Flyover is an overpass along the Pan-Philippine Highway (Davao–Agusan National Highway) in Tagum, Davao del Norte. It carries traffic of Pan-Philippine Highway crossing its junction with Surigao–Davao Coastal Road (locally known as Apokon Road) and Tagum–Panabo Circumferential Road (locally known as Pioneer Avenue). It is the longest flyover in Mindanao with the length of 1.035 kilometers (0.643 mi).

== Construction ==
The Tagum City Flyover is a national project lobbied by Davao del Norte 1st district representative and then-House Speaker Pantaleon Alvarez. The overpass would be the first in Tagum. Construction began in November 2017.

The project was met with some opposition, with critics insists that other issues of Davao del Norte, like frequent flooding should have been prioritized instead. Opposition included those from the city's business sector. In response to skepticism to the flyover project, the Department of Public Works and Highways's Davao office said that the overpass is meant to address the anticipated growth of Tagum's economy.

By July 2020, the flyover is already 84.23% complete. The flyover was opened on October 4, 2021 and later inaugurated on November 20, 2021.

== Specifications ==
The Tagum City Flyover is the longest overpass in Mindanao with a total length of 1.035 km (0.643 mi); it was earlier stated that it was 1.6 kilometers (0.99 mi) long. It was built along the Davao–Agusan portion of the Pan-Philippine Highway and crosses most especially the Tagum Junction, its intersection with Surigao–Davao Coastal Road (locally known as Apokon Road) and Tagum–Panabo Circumferential Road (locally known as Pioneer Avenue), in Tagum's central business district.
