= N70 highway =

Road in Leyte, Philippines

Route 70

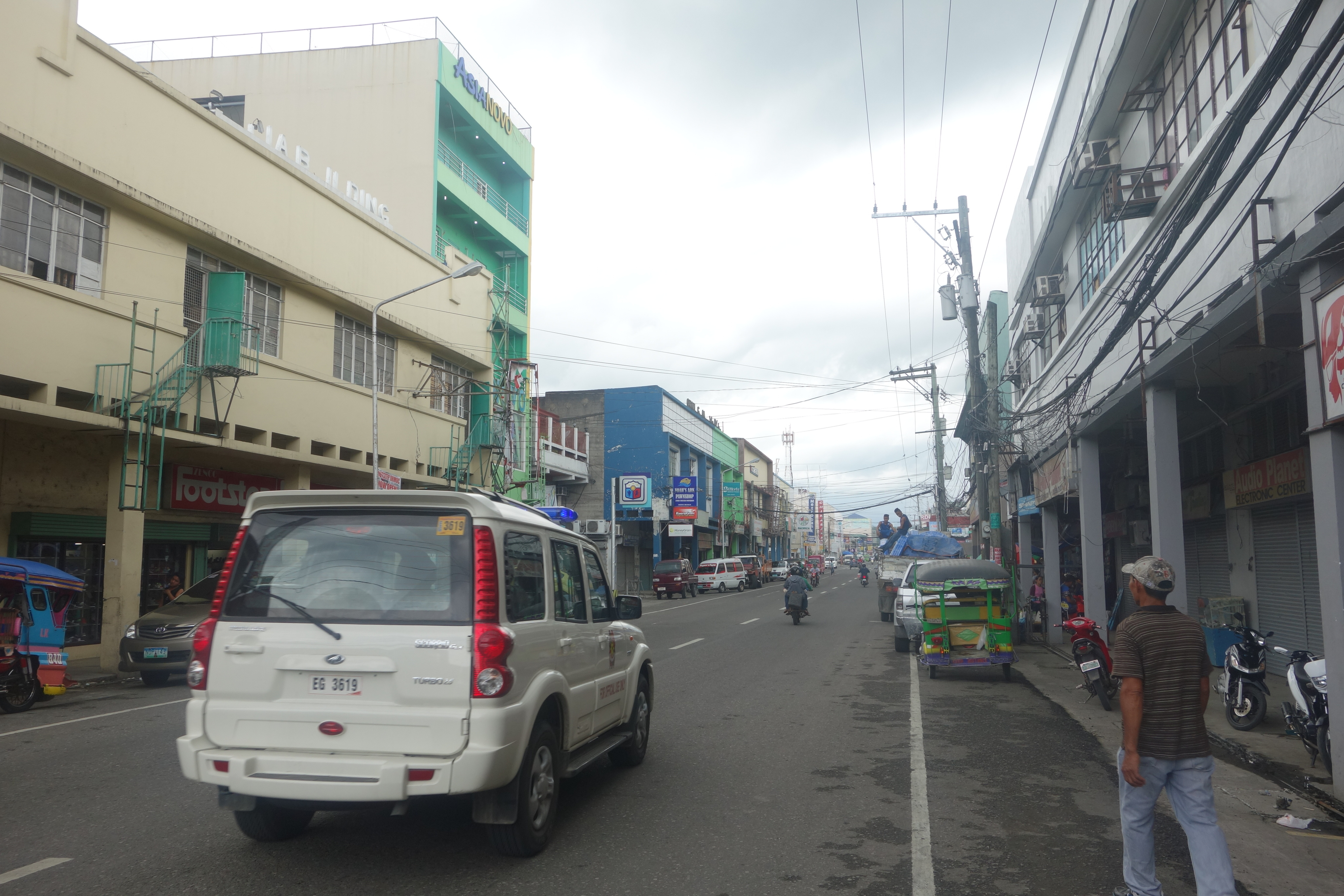
- N70 as Real Street in Ormoc

Route information
- Auxiliary route of AH 26 (26)
- Maintained by Department of Public Works and Highways
- Component highways: AH 26 (N70) from Palo to Ormoc

Major junctions
- From: AH 26 (N1) (Maharlika Highway) in Palo
- N718 (Palo West Bypass Road) in Capoocan; N681 (Lemon–Leyte–Biliran Road) in Capoocan; N683 (Dayhagan–Salvacion–Coob–Libertad Road) in Ormoc; N684 (Palompon–Isabel–Merida–Ormoc Road) in Ormoc; N692 (Ormoc–Baybay–Southern Leyte Boundary Road) in Baybay
- To: AH 26 (N1) (Maharlika Highway) in Mahaplag

Location
- Country: Philippines
- Provinces: Leyte
- Major cities: Ormoc, Baybay
- Towns: Palo, Santa Fe, Alangalang, Jaro, Tunga, Carigara, Capoocan, Kananga, Albuera, Mahaplag

Highway system
- Roads in the Philippines; Highways; Expressways; List
← N69	→ N73

National Route 70 (N70) forms part of the Philippine highway network. It partially spurs the Asian Highway 26 (AH26) from Palo to Ormoc in Leyte, Philippines.

== Route description ==
Some of N70's segments are also known as Real Road.

=== Palo to Ormoc ===
N70 begins at its intersection with Maharlika Highway (N1) in Palo, near the Palo Cathedral, as Palo–Carigara–Ormoc Road. In the Palo town proper, it is locally known as San Salvador Street. The route proceeds northwestward toward the northern coast of Leyte, traversing the municipalities of Santa Fe, Alangalang, Jaro (where it bypasses the town proper), Tunga, and Carigara (locally designated as J. Riel Street in the town proper). Between Tunga and Carigara, the road is also known as Tunga–Carigara Road.

Upon reaching Capoocan, the highway runs along the northern coastline of Leyte before turning south to return inland toward Kananga through the Leyte Cordillera mountain range. In the city of Ormoc, the route turns south at the Simangan Rotonda as it runs parallel to the Anilao River, then follows Lilia Avenue into the city proper, veers south onto Apo Street, and continues southeast across the Anilao River as Hermosilla Street. It then heads south on Real Street and the Asian Highway 26 (AH26) leaves the highway toward the Ormoc Port as it meets Aviles Street.

=== Ormoc to Baybay ===
N70 transitions into the Ormoc–Baybay–Southern Leyte Boundary Road as it veers southeast to follow Aviles Street. After crossing the Malbasag River, the highway continues along the western coast of Leyte, passing through the Camp Downes military zone as a narrower road before returning to the shoreline. It then traverses the municipality of Albuera and the city of Baybay, where it assumes the alternative name Baybay–Inopacan Road.

=== Baybay to Mahaplag ===
In the Baybay city proper, the route veers east and becomes the Tacloban–Baybay South Road. From here, it moves inland away from the coast, climbing the Leyte Cordillera mountain range once again toward Mahaplag. The route finally terminates at its junction with the Maharlika Highway (N1) in Mahaplag.

== Asian Highway Network ==
This route partially spurs the Asian Highway 26, running from Palo to Ormoc and continues as a sea ferry to Cebu City.

== History ==
The direct predecessors of N70 are Highway 2 from Palo to Baybay and Highway 1 from Baybay to Mahaplag.

Upon the ratification of the Asian Highway Network by the Philippines in 2007, the highway's segment from Palo to Ormoc was later made part of the Pan-Philippine Highway, particularly its spur in Visayas. The highway network connecting Palo and Mahaplag via the western coast of Leyte was later designated by the Department of Public Works and Highways as N70. The route is signposted from Palo to Ormoc but since the non-AH26 section of the route does not have its own route markers, it is not signposted from Ormoc to Mahaplag.
