= N673 highway =

Road in the Philippines

Route 673

Route information
- Maintained by Department of Public Works and Highways

Pili Diversion Road (Camarines Sur)
- Length: 3.95 km (2.45 mi)
- North end: AH 26 (N1) (Maharlika Highway) in Pili
- South end: N630 (Governor Jose Fuentebella National Highway) in Pili

Old Calbayog National Route (Samar)
- Length: 1.99 km (1.24 mi)
- North end: AH 26 (N1) (Maharlika Highway) in Calbayog
- South end: Barangay Trinidad in Calbayog

Location
- Country: Philippines
- Provinces: Camarines Sur, Samar
- Major cities: Calbayog
- Towns: Pili

Highway system
- Roads in the Philippines; Highways; Expressways; List
← N672	→ N674

National Route 673 (N673) forms a part of the Philippine highway network. It is one of the national secondary roads with two non-contiguous highways, one which runs through the municipality of Pili, Camarines Sur in the Bicol region of Luzon, while the other road runs within the city of Calbayog in the Samar region of Visayas.

== Route description ==
=== Camarines Sur ===
In Pili, the province's municipality and provincial capital, N673 starts at the intersection of N1 (Maharlika Highway) on its northern terminus and ends at the intersection of N630 (Governor Jose Fuentebella National Highway) as its southern terminus. The entire numbered route is known as Pili Diversion Road, where it bypasses the town proper which Maharlika Highway leads.

=== Samar ===
In Calbayog, N673 connects from N1 (Maharlika Highway) to Barangay Trinidad. The entire numbered route is known as Old Calbayog National Route, Calbayog Old National Route, or Old National Road, which parallels the runway of Calbayog Airport. After intersecting a narrow street in Barangay Trinidad, the road then continues south unnumbered up to Barangay Basud.
