= Midsayap–Marbel Road =

Highway in the Philippines

Midsayap–Marbel Road
- Makar–Dulawan–Midsayap–Marbel Road
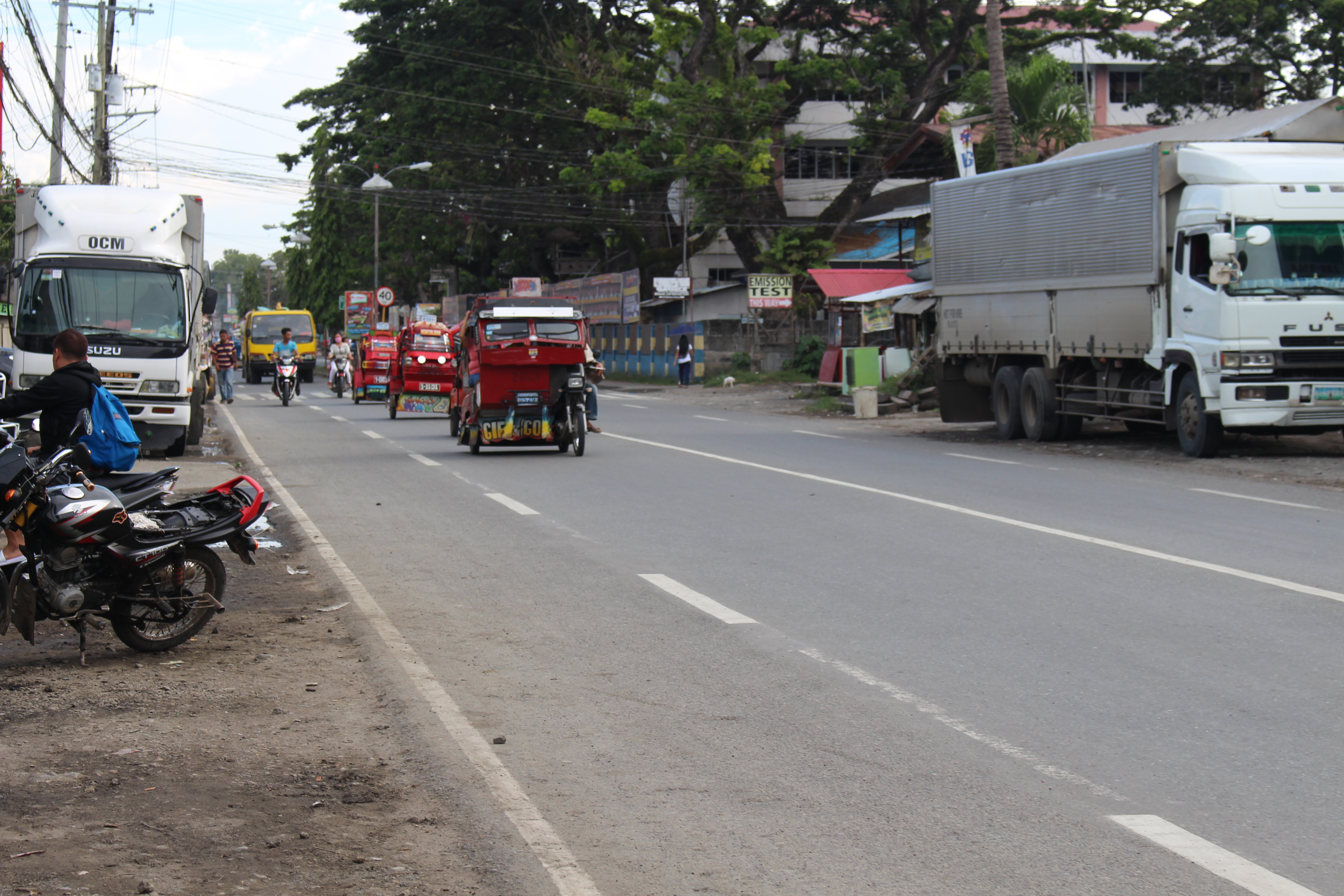
- Section of the Midsayap–Marbel Road at Midsayap

Route information
- Maintained by Department of Public Works and Highways
- Length: 101 km (63 mi)
- Component highways: N940

Major junctions
- From: N75 (Davao–Cotabato Road) at Midsayap
- N76 (Makilala–Allah Valley Road) at Tacurong
- To: AH26 (Maharlika Highway) at Koronadal

Location
- Country: Philippines
- Major cities: Tacurong, Koronadal
- Towns: Midsayap, Datu Piang, Datu Salibo, Datu Saudi Ampatuan, Mamasapano, Rajah Buayan, Sultan sa Barongis, Lambayong, Tantangan

Highway system
- Roads in the Philippines; Highways; Expressways; List
← N935	→ N941

The Midsayap–Marbel Road, also known as Makar–Dulawan–Midsayap–Marbel Road, is a 101-kilometer (63 mi), two-to-four lane highway that connects the provinces of Cotabato, Maguindanao del Sur, Sultan Kudarat, and South Cotabato. It is classified as a national secondary highway for Mindanao. It lessens the travel time from Cotabato to South Cotabato and Sultan Kudarat via Midsayap.

The highway forms part of National Route 940 (N940) of the Philippine highway network.

== Route description ==
=== Midsayap to Datu Saudi Ampatuan ===
The northern section of N940 is at Midsayap that links to N75. It links Midsayap to municipalities of Datu Piang, Datu Salibo, and Datu Saudi Ampatuan at 29-kilometre (18 mi). At Datu Saudi Ampatuan, it links to an unnamed secondary highway which is the Salbu-Pagatin Highway.

=== Datu Saudi Ampatuan to Tacurong ===
The N940 links Datu Saudi Ampatuan to other municipalities in Maguindanao del Sur. It traverses Mamasapano, Rajah Buayan, and Sultan sa Barongis. The bridge that links Maguindanao del Sur and Sultan Kudarat is the Pinguiaman Bridge. It traverses the municipality of Lambayong and finally links up in Tacurong at 42-kilometre (26 mi).

=== Tacurong to Koronadal ===
At Tacurong, there is a roundabout that links with N76. It traverses the municipality of Tantangan in South Cotabato. The western section of N940 is at Koronadal that links to AH26 at 30-kilometre (19 mi).
