= Pan-Philippine Highway =

Highway in the Philippines traversing most of the country

Pan-Philippine Highway
- Maharlika Highway; Asian Highway 26; Daang Maharlika
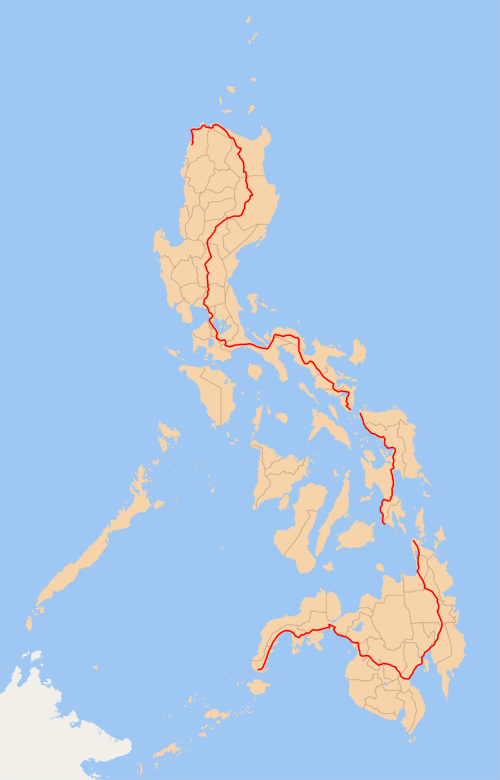
- Map of the Philippines showing the route of Pan-Philippine Highway

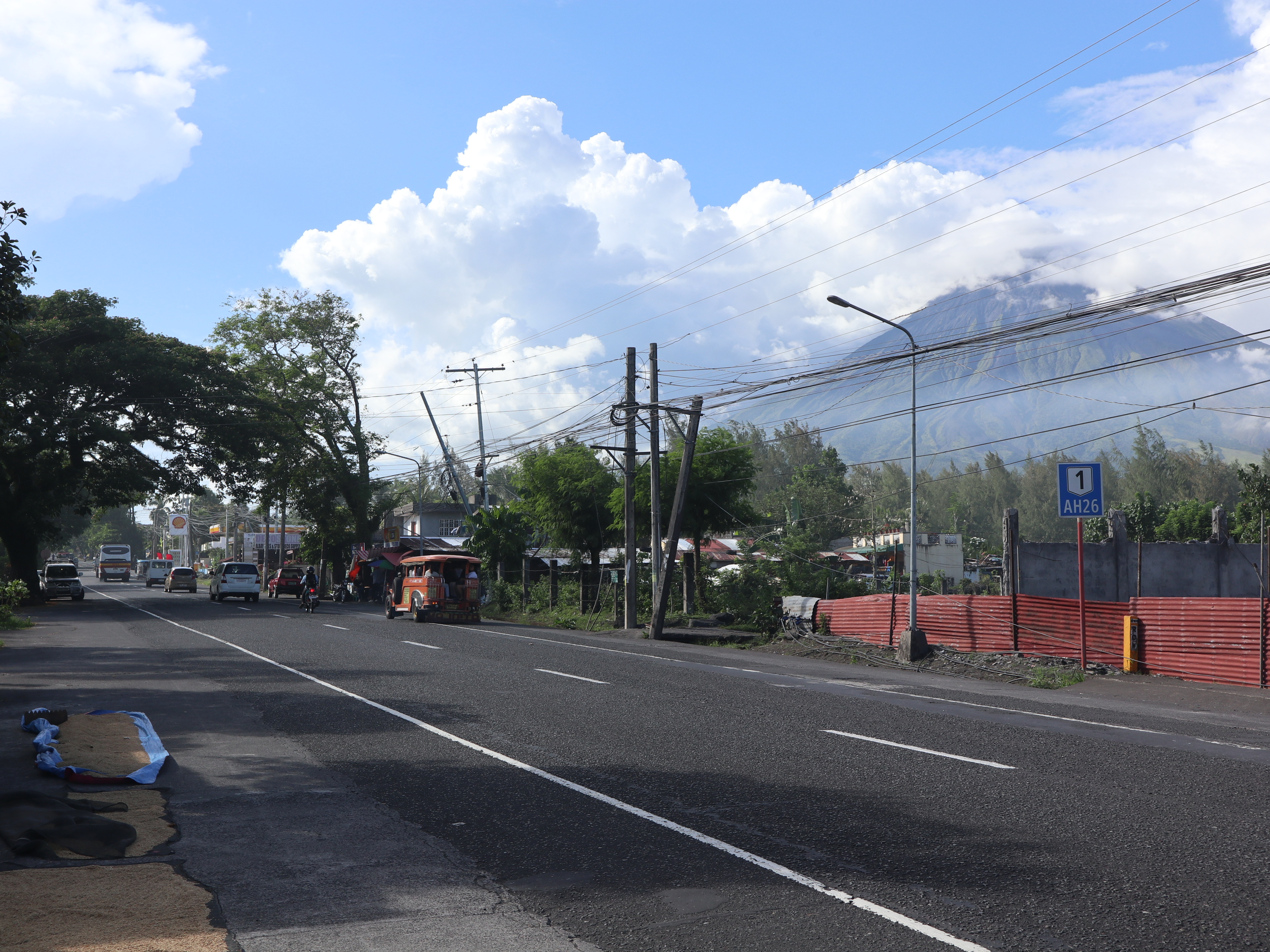
- The highway segment in Daraga, Albay, with an AH26 route marker (right), overlooking Mayon Volcano in the background

Route information
- Maintained by the Department of Public Works and Highways (DPWH)
- Length: 3,379.73 km (2,100.07 mi) Excludes sea routes Includes the 96.98 km (60.26 mi) Tacloban–Ormoc spur and the 292.39 km (181.68 mi) Davao City–Cagayan de Oro spur
- Existed: 1960s–present

Major junctions
- North end: Laoag, Philippines
- South end: Zamboanga City, Philippines

Location
- Country: Philippines
- Regions: Ilocos Region; Cagayan Valley; Central Luzon; Metro Manila; Calabarzon; Bicol Region; Eastern Visayas; Caraga; Soccsksargen; Davao Region; Northern Mindanao; Zamboanga Peninsula
- Provinces: Ilocos Norte; Cagayan; Isabela; Nueva Vizcaya; Nueva Ecija; Bulacan; Laguna; Cavite; Batangas; Quezon; Camarines Norte; Camarines Sur; Albay; Sorsogon; Northern Samar; Samar; Eastern Samar; Leyte; Southern Leyte; Surigao del Norte; Agusan del Norte; Agusan del Sur; Davao de Oro; Davao del Norte; Davao del Sur; Sarangani; South Cotabato; Sultan Kudarat; Maguindanao del Sur; Maguindanao del Norte; Lanao del Sur; Lanao del Norte; Zamboanga del Sur; Zamboanga Sibugay

Highway system
- Asian Highway Network

The Pan-Philippine Highway, also known as the Maharlika Highway (Tagalog: Daang Maharlika; (Note: Also tautologically referred to as Daang Maharlika Road.) Cebuano: Dalang Halangdon), is a network of roads, expressways, bridges, and ferry services connecting the islands of Luzon, Samar, Leyte, and Mindanao in the Philippines, serving as the country's principal transport backbone. Measuring 3,379.73 kilometers (2,100.07 mi) in length, excluding sea routes not counted by highway milestones, it is the longest road in the Philippines and forms the north–south backbone component of National Route 1 (N1) of the Philippine highway network. The entire highway is designated as Asian Highway 26 (AH26) of the Asian Highway Network.

The highway's northern terminus is located in front of the Ilocos Norte Provincial Capitol in Laoag, while its southern terminus is near the Zamboanga City Hall in Zamboanga City.

== History ==
The Pan-Philippine Highway System was an infrastructure program of President Ferdinand Marcos as a first priority project for the improvement and expansion of Philippine highway and land transport networks. The project required the concreting of 3,003 kilometers (1,866 mi) from 1965 to 1969. This included the construction of 11,333 bridges, comprising the entire system. It is a mixture of old existing roads and new roads that would be eventually added to become part of the highway. Government planners believed that the motorway and other connected roads would stimulate agricultural production by reducing transport costs, encourage social and economic development outside existing major urban centers such as Manila, and expand industrial production for domestic and overseas markets. Construction, which continued in the following decades, was supported by loans and grants from foreign aid institutions, including the World Bank. In 1979, the highway was renamed to Maharlika Highway.

The highway was rehabilitated and improved in 1997, during the administration of President Fidel V. Ramos, with assistance from the Japanese government, and dubbed the "Philippine-Japan Friendship Highway". Japan's assistance is applied only up to Carmen, Davao del Norte at the south, thus covering only about 2,100 kilometers (1,300 mi) or about 62% of the highway's entire length. In 1998, the Department of Tourism designated 35 sections of the highway as "Scenic Highways", with developed amenities for travelers and tourists. The highway was later realigned from the Digos–Maguindanao section of the Davao–Cotabato Road to traverse General Santos at the south.

The highway was officially designated as Asian Highway 26 (AH26), following the Philippines' 2007 ratification of the Intergovernmental Agreement (IGA) on the Asian Highway Network. In response, the Department of Public Works and Highways (DPWH) issued Department Order No. 15, initiating a two-phase project from 2009 to 2010 to install AH26 route markers and directional signs. The Pan-Philippine Highway originally encompassed untolled sections between Guiguinto, Bulacan, and Calamba, Laguna, but its alignment was later shifted to utilize the North and South Luzon Expressways, as well as EDSA. Auxiliary routes in Metro Manila, Leyte, and Mindanao were later added. In the mid-2020s, alongside N1, the highway was realigned from the Simuay–Landasan–Parang Road (now N937) to a bypass road also traversing between Parang and Sultan Mastura in Maguindanao del Norte.

=== Proposed rehabilitation ===
In 2026, the DPWH announced a massive, full-scale rehabilitation of the Pan-Philippine Highway that is slated to start with a bidding around April. This initiative marks the first comprehensive overhaul of the highway since its completion in the late 1970s. According to Secretary Vince Dizon, the project would prioritize the highway's segments in Quezon, Bicol Region, Samar, and parts of Mindanao.

== Asian Highway Network ==
The Pan-Philippine Highway is designated as AH26 in the Asian Highway Network, a cooperative project which seeks to improve highway systems and standards across the continent. Ratified by the Philippines in 2007, it is currently the only highway in the system that is isolated from every other highway; island-based sections of the Asian Highway Network in Japan (AH1), Sri Lanka (AH43) and Indonesia (AH2) are all linked to the mainland sections by ferries to South Korea (AH1), India (Dhanushkodi), and Singapore, respectively. Despite its isolation, it can be linked internationally via ferry like the Zamboanga–Malaysia route.

== Route description ==
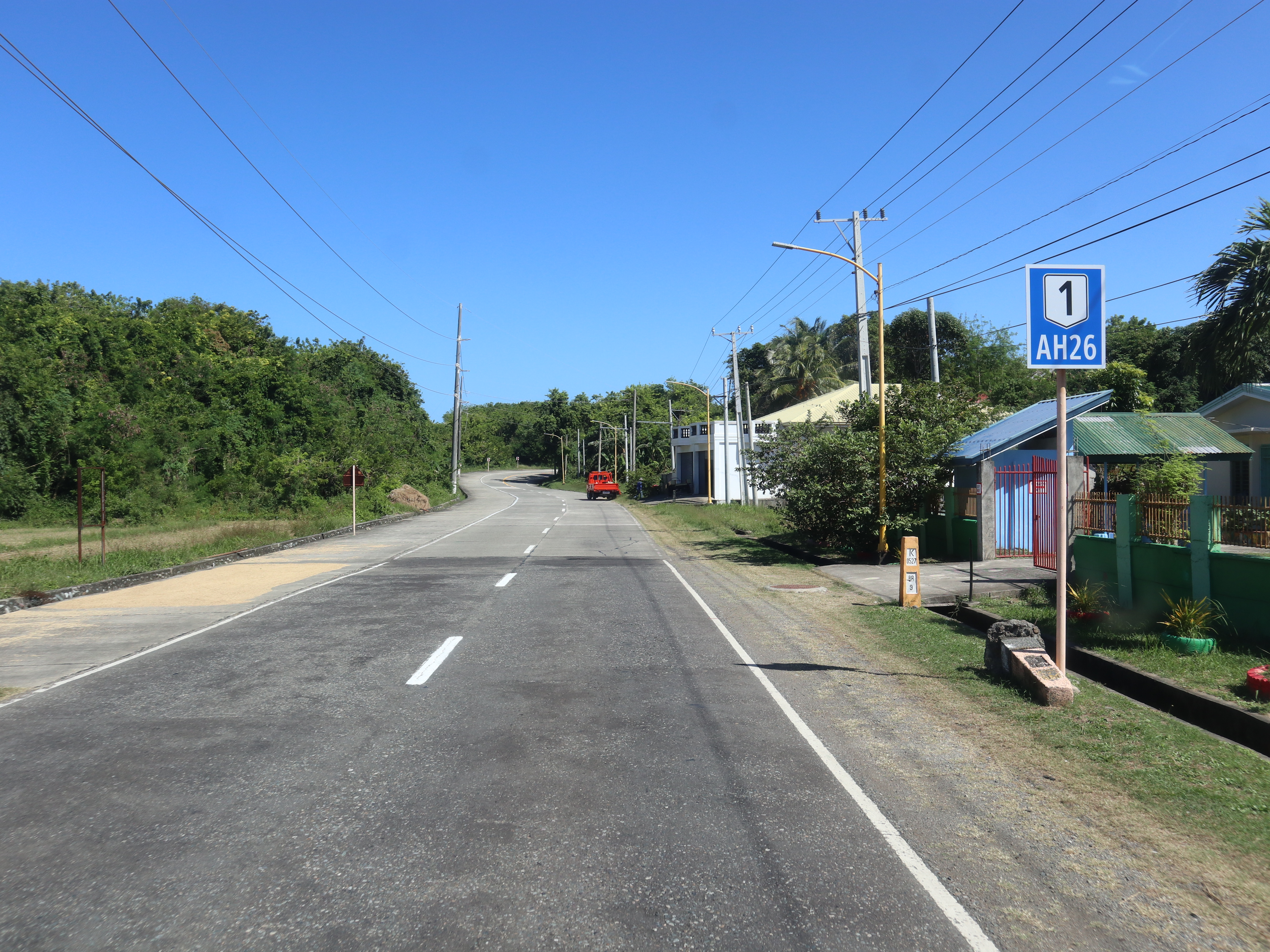
N1/AH26 reassurance marker in Burgos, Ilocos Norte

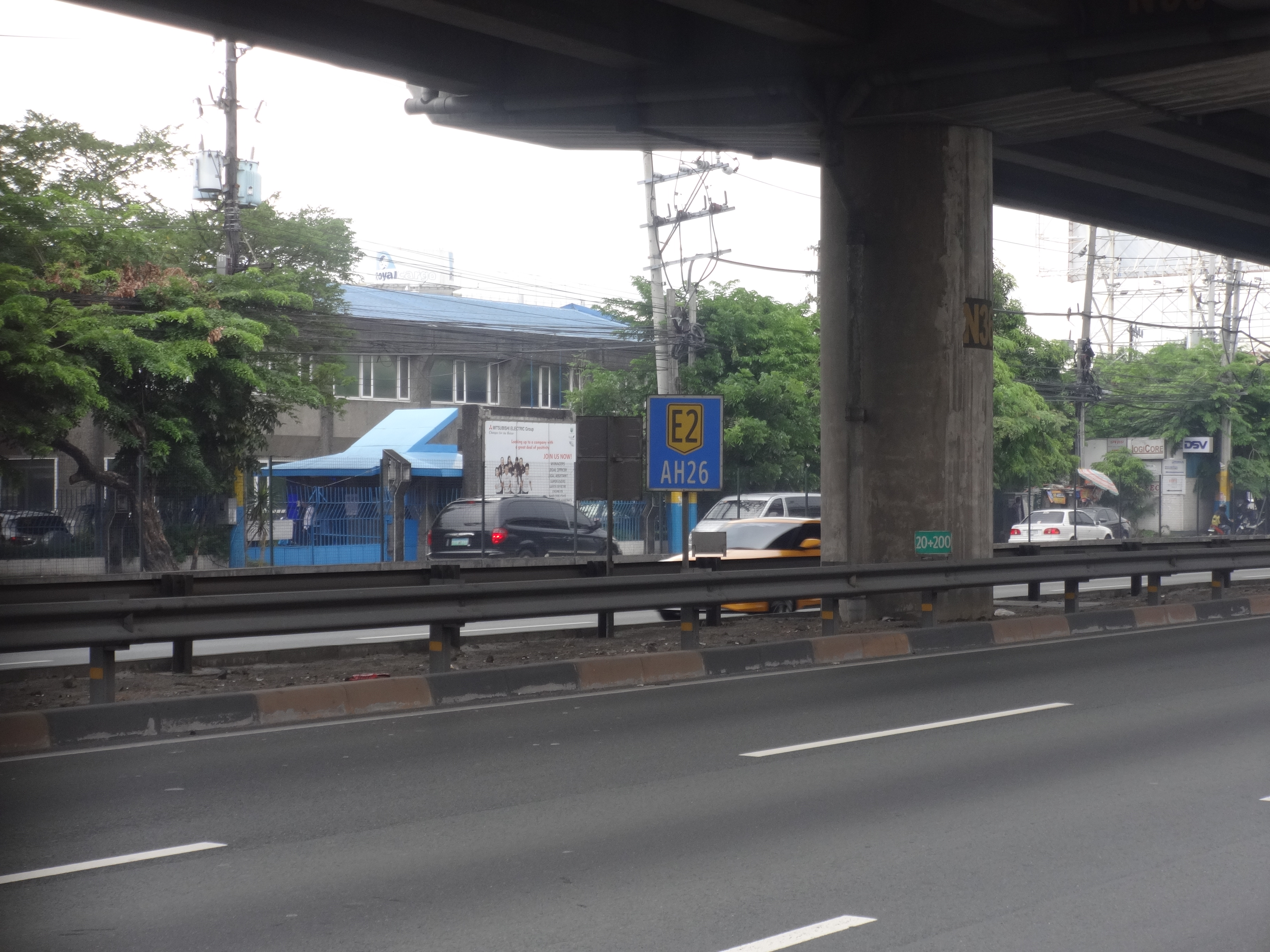
E2/AH26 reassurance marker along South Luzon Expressway (Skyway At-Grade) in Muntinlupa

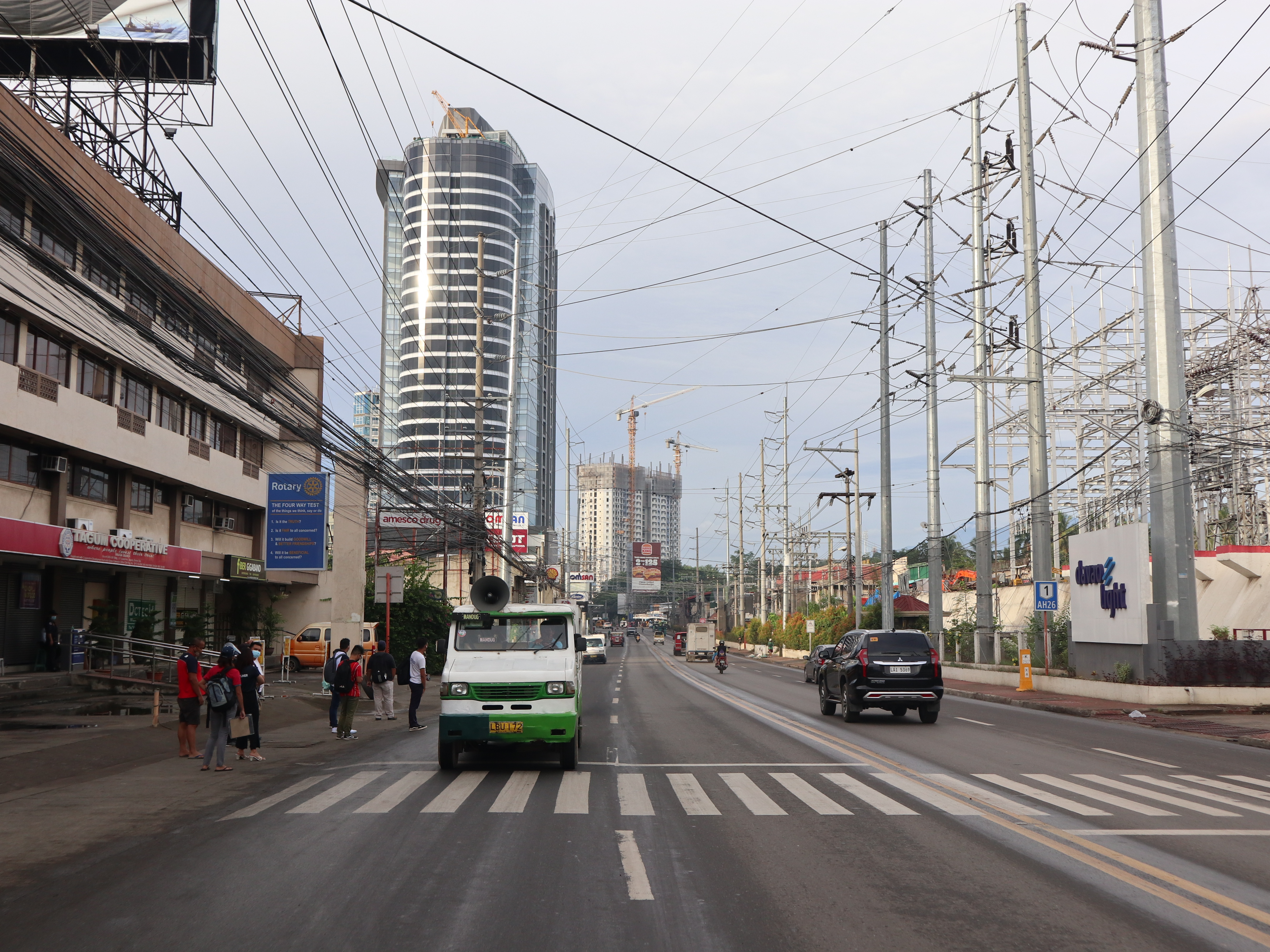
J.P. Laurel Avenue in Davao City, featuring an N1/AH26 reassurance marker in 2021. This segment was reclassified to N916-5 in the mid-2020s, though it remains part of the Pan-Philippine Highway (AH26).

AH26 officially runs along the following thoroughfares:

- N1: Laoag – Guiguinto
  - Manila North Road (Note: Partially signed as AH26)/Maharlika Highway: Laoag (Note: A segment of Manila North Road in Laoag is also known as and a part of Laoag–Paoay Road.) (Note: A segment of Pan-Philippine Highway in Laoag and Pagadian is locally known as J.P. Rizal Avenue, respectively.) (Note: A segment of Pan-Philippine Highway stretching north out of Laoag is known as Gen. Fidel V. Segundo Avenue.) – Burgos (Note: A segment of Pan-Philippine Highway here is locally known as National Highway.) – Aparri
  - Bangag-Magapit Road: Aparri – Lal-lo (Note: A segment of Bangag-Magapit Road is also known as Logac-Magapit Road in Lal-lo, Cagayan.)
  - Cagayan Valley Road: Lal-lo – Tuguegarao
  - Maharlika Highway: (Note: The segment of Maharlika Highway from Isabela to Bulacan is also known as Cagayan Valley Road.) (Note: Pan-Philippine Highway is also known as Doña Remedios Trinidad Highway from San Rafael to Pulilan in Bulacan, bypassing the respective municipal centers of Baliuag and Bustos.) San Pablo – Cabagan – Ilagan – Cauayan – Santiago – Solano (Note: A segment of Pan-Philippine Highway at the town proper is locally known as J.P. Rizal Street.) (Note: A segment of Pan-Philippine Highway at the town proper of Solano, Nueva Vizcaya is locally known as J. Manzano Street and Aquino Avenue, respectively.) (Note: A segment of Pan-Philippine Highway from Plaridel to Guiguinto in Bulacan is also known as Calle Rizal.) – Bayombong – Santa Fe – San Jose City – Cabanatuan – Gapan – San Miguel – Baliwag – Pulilan – Guiguinto
- E1: Guiguinto – Quezon City
  - North Luzon Expressway: Santa Rita Interchange – Balintawak Interchange
- N1: Quezon City – Makati
  - EDSA (Eastern Route): Balintawak Interchange – Magallanes Interchange
- E2: Makati – Calamba
  - South Luzon Expressway: Magallanes Interchange – Calamba Exit
- N1: Calamba – Matnog
  - Maharlika Highway: (Note: The segments of Maharlika Highway from Calamba to Tayabas, in Pagbilao, and from Atimonan to Matnog are historically referred to as Manila South Road.) Calamba – Santo Tomas – San Pablo – Tiaong (Note: A segment of Pan-Philippine Highway at the town proper of Tiaong, Quezon is locally known as Doña Tating Street and Don V. Robles Street, respectively.) – Candelaria (Note: A segment of Pan-Philippine Highway at the town proper is locally known as Rizal Avenue.) – Sariaya (Note: A segment of Pan-Philippine Highway at the town proper of Sariaya, Quezon is locally known as General Luna Street.) – Tayabas
  - Lucena Diversion Road: (Note: Lucena Diversion Road is also known as MSR Diversion Road.) Tayabas – Lucena – Pagbilao
  - Maharlika Highway: (Note: The segment of Pan-Philippine Highway through the Quezon National Forest Park in Pagbilao and Atimonan, Quezon is also known as New Diversion Road or simply as Diversion Road.) (Note: A segment of Pan-Philippine Highway from the town proper of Milaor, Camarines Sur to Naga in Camarines Sur is locally known as Mabolo Road.) Pagbilao (Note: A segment of Pan-Philippine Highway at the town proper of Pagbilao, Quezon is locally known as C.M. Recto Street and Pornobi Street, respectively, and collectively known as the MSR Diversion Road.) – Atimonan – Gumaca (Note: A segment of Pan-Philippine Highway at the town proper of Gumaca, Quezon is locally known as A. Bonifacio Street.) – Lopez (Note: A segment of Pan-Philippine Highway at the town proper of Lopez, Quezon is locally known as General Vera Avenue.) – Calauag – Labo – Daet – Sipocot – Milaor – Naga City (Note: A segment of Pan-Philippine Highway in Naga, Camarines Sur is locally known as Roxas Avenue or Diversion Road.) – Pili – Nabua – Polangui – Daraga – Sorsogon City (Note: A segment of Pan-Philippine Highway at the city proper of Sorsogon City is locally known as Rizal Street and Magsaysay Street, respectively) – Irosin – Matnog
- Gap (San Bernardino Strait)
  - Matnog–Allen ferry line: Luzon – Visayas
- N1: (Note: The segment of Pan-Philippine Highway from Tacloban to Baybay is also known as Tacloban–Baybay South Road.) Allen – Calbayog (Note: A segment of Pan-Philippine Highway at the city proper of Calbayog, Samar is locally known as Jose D. Avelino Street or Senate President Jose Avelino Avenue.) – Catbalogan (Note: A segment of Pan-Philippine Highway at the city proper of Catbalogan, Samar is locally known as Del Rosario Street, Curry Avenue, San Roque Street, and Rizal Avenue Extension, respectively.) – Tacloban – Palo – Mahaplag – Liloan
- Gap (Bohol Sea)
  - Liloan–Lipata ferry line: Visayas – Mindanao
- N1: Surigao City – Davao City
  - Maharlika Highway: Surigao City – Kitcharao
  - Surigao-Butuan National Highway: Kitcharao – Butuan
  - Davao-Agusan National Highway: Butuan – Bayugan – Tagum – Davao City (Note: A segment of Davao-Cotabato Road in the vicinity of Panacan, Davao City is also known as Davao City-Panabo City Road.)
- N916-5: Davao City
  - Davao-Agusan National Highway
  - J.P. Laurel Avenue
  - C.M. Recto Avenue (one-way street)
  - Davao–Cotabato Road (Note: The segment of Davao-Cotabato Road from the Davao City proper to Talomo, Davao City partially covers and is also known as A. Pichon Street (a one-way street), Elpidio Quirino Avenue, and MacArthur Highway, respectively.)
- N1: Davao City – Zamboanga City
  - Davao–Cotabato Road: Davao City – Digos
  - Digos-Makar Road: (Note: Digos-Makar Road is also known as Davao-GenSan National Highway or Davao–GenSan Highway) Digos – Malungon – General Santos (Note: A segment of Digos-Makar Road in General Santos is locally known as Jose Catolico Sr. Avenue.)
  - Marbel-Makar Road: (Note: The segment of Marbel-Makar Road from General Santos to Polomolok, South Cotabato is also known as General Santos - Polomolok National Road, GenSan - Polomolok National Road, or Polomolok National Highway.) General Santos – Polomolok (Note: The segment of Marbel-Makar Road in Polomolok (approaching Tupi, South Cotabato) is also known as Polomolok - Tupi National Highway.) – Koronadal (Note: A segment of Marbel-Makar Road in the Koronadal city proper is locally known as Gensan Drive.)
  - Cotabato-Marbel Road: (Note: Cotabato-Marbel Road is also known as Koronadal City - Cotabato City National Highway.) (Note: The segment of Cotabato-Marbel Road from Banga to Surallah, South Cotabato is also known as Banga-Surallah Road.) (Note: The segment of Cotabato-Marbel Road from Koronadal to Banga, South Cotabato is also known as Banga–Koronadal City Road.) (Note: The segment of Cotabato-Marbel Road from Banga, South Cotabato to Isulan, Sultan Kudarat is also known as Banga–Isulan Road, signed under AH26.) (Note: The segment of Cotabato-Marbel Road from Surallah, South Cotabato to Isulan, Sultan Kudarat is also known as Surallah-Isulan Road, signed under AH26.) Koronadal (Note: A segment of Cotabato-Marbel Road in the Koronadal city proper is locally known as Rafael Alunan Avenue.) – Banga – Surallah – Norala
  - Isulan-Surallah Road: Isulan (Note: A segment of Isulan-Surallah Road in Isulan, Sultan Kudarat is locally known as Sen. Ninoy Aquino Avenue.)
  - Marbel-Allah Valley-Cotabato Road: (Note: The segment of Marbel-Allah Valley-Cotabato Road from Isulan, Sultan Kudarat to Shariff Aguak, Maguindanao del Sur, is also known as Isulan–Shariff Aguak Road, while the segment from Shariff Aguak to Cotabato City is also known as Shariff Aguak–Cotabato City Road.) Isulan – Shariff Aguak – Cotabato City (Note: A segment of Marbel-Allah Valley-Cotabato Road in the city proper of Cotabato City is locally known as Sinsuat Avenue.)
  - Cotabato-Lanao Road: (Note: A segment of Cotabato–Lanao Road from Cotabato City to Sultan Kudarat, Maguindanao del Norte is also known as Quezon Avenue.) (Note: A segment of Pan-Philippine Highway from Sultan Kudarat, Maguindanao del Norte to Tukuran, Zamboanga del Sur is also known as Narciso Ramos Highway.) Cotabato City – Matanog
  - Cotabato–Malabang–Lanao del Norte Road: (Note: The segment of Pan-Philippine Highway from Malabang, Lanao del Sur to Tukuran, Lanao del Sur is also known as Malabang–Tukuran Road.) (Note: A segment of Pan-Philippine Highway, including Cotabato–Malabang–Lanao del Norte Road, between Tukuran, Lanao del Sur and Pagadian, Zamboanga del Sur is also known as Tukuran–Pagadian Highway.) Sultan Dumalondong – Picong
  - Malabang–Dobleston–Tukuran Road: Sultan Naga Dimaporo
  - Tucuran Junction–Karomatan Junction Road: Tukuran
  - Maharlika Highway: (Note: A segment of Pan-Philippine Highway between Tukuran, Zamboanga del Sur and Zamboanga City is also known as Lanao–Pagadian–Zamboanga City Road and Pagadian City–Zamboanga City Road, respectively.) Tukuran – Pagadian– Ipil – Tungawan – Zamboanga City (Note: A segment of Pan-Philippine Highway in Zamboanga City is locally known as Maria Clara L. Lobregat Highway, Veterans Avenue, Governor Lim Avenue, and Don Pablo Lorenzo Street, respectively.)

=== Auxiliary Routes ===
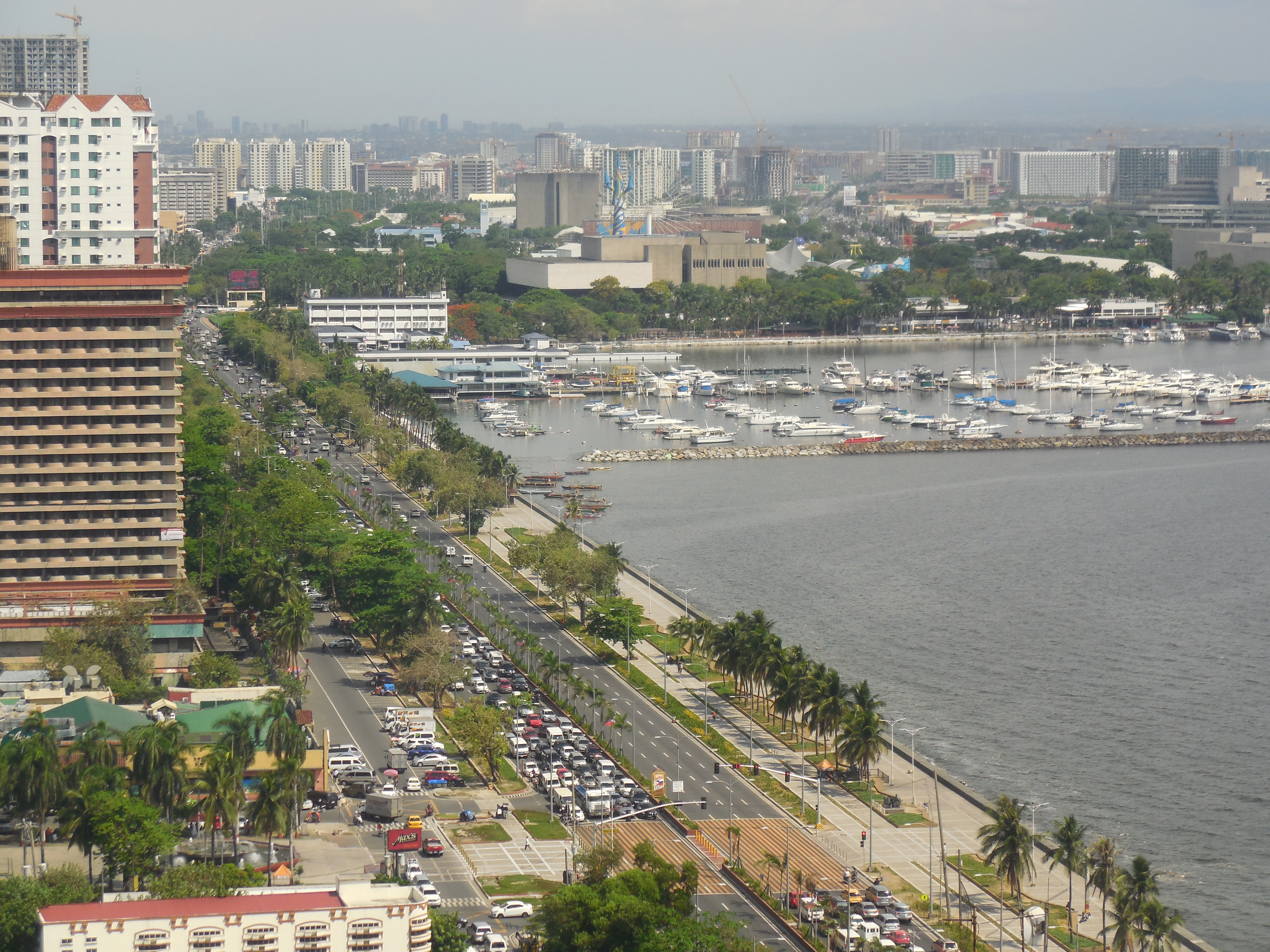
Roxas Boulevard (N120/AH26) passing through the capital city of Manila

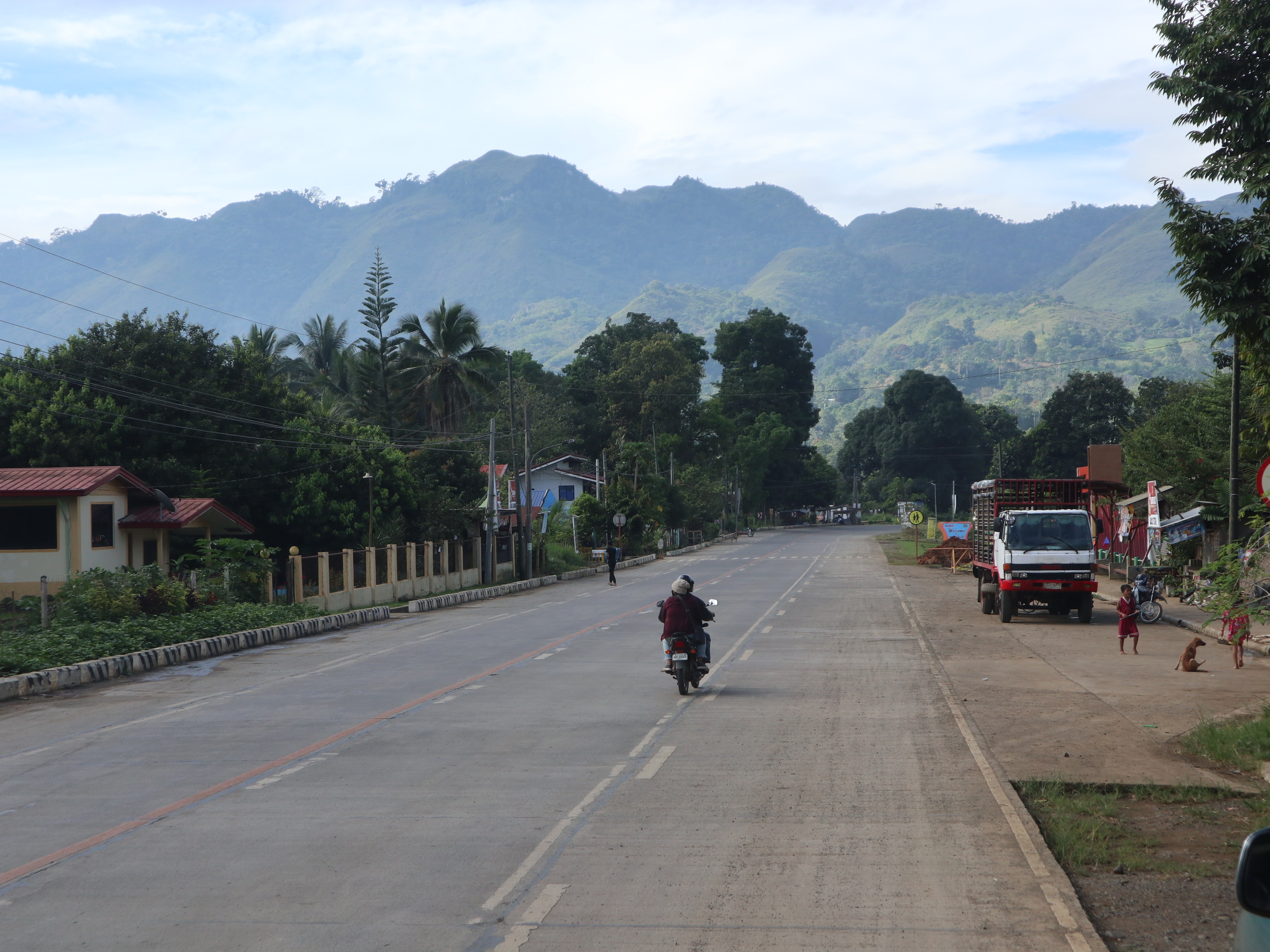
Sayre Highway (N10/AH26) in Manolo Fortich, Bukidnon

Alternatively, AH26 runs along the following thoroughfares:

Luzon (West Metro Manila)

- N1: Quezon City – Caloocan
  - EDSA (Western Route): Balintawak Interchange – Monumento
- N120: Caloocan – Pasay
  - Samson Road: Caloocan
  - Gen. San Miguel Street: Caloocan
  - C-4 Road: Caloocan – Malabon – Navotas
  - R-10: Navotas
  - Mel Lopez Boulevard: (Note: Mel Lopez Boulevard in Manila is known as Radial Road 10 or R-10 for partially being its component.) Manila
  - Bonifacio Drive: Manila
  - Roxas Boulevard: Manila – Pasay
- N1: Pasay – Makati
  - EDSA (Western Route): Roxas Boulevard – Magallanes Interchange

Luzon (South Skyway)

- E2: Makati – Muntinlupa
  - Skyway: Makati – Muntinlupa (Note: The extent of E2/AH26 in Skyway is unknown since the DPWH's GIS apps does not show any route designation for the tollway. Despite this, some E2/AH26 markers were seen between Buendia, Makati and Alabang, Muntinlupa until they were dismantled together with the center barriers in 2020.)

Visayas

- N70: (Note: Alternative name varies, according to its segments between towns/cities. For example, Palo–Carigara–Ormoc Road is also known as Palo–Santa Fe Road from Palo to Santa Fe and Tunga–Carigara Road from Tunga to Carigara. Some segments are named Real Street.) Palo (Note: A segment of Pan-Philippine Highway at the town proper of Palo, Leyte is locally known as San Salvador Street.) – Carigara (Note: A segment of Pan-Philippine Highway at the town proper of Carigara, Leyte is locally known as J. Riel Street.) – Ormoc (Note: A segment of Palo–Carigara–Ormoc Road at the city proper of Ormoc is locally known as Lilia Avenue, Apo Street, Hermosilla Street, and Real Street, respectively.)
- Gap (Camotes Sea)
  - Ormoc–Cebu ferry line

Mindanao

- N10: Davao City – Cagayan de Oro
  - Bukidnon–Davao Road (Note: Sayre Highway from Valencia to Maramag and Bukidnon–Davao Road from Quezon to Kitaotao are also known as Dologon–Busco–Quezon Road.): Davao City – Quezon (Note: A segment of Bukidnon–Davao Road in Quezon, Bukidnon is locally known as J. A. Fortich Road.) – Maramag
  - Sayre Highway: Maramag – Malaybalay (Note: A segment of Sayre Highway at the city proper of Malaybalay is locally known as Fortich Street.) – Cagayan de Oro
- N9: (Note: The northern ends of the AH26 auxiliary route in Mindanao are at Port of Cagayan de Oro and Marcos Bridge, both in Cagayan de Oro.) Cagayan de Oro
- N946: Cagayan de Oro

== Intersections ==
Ilocos Norte

- N122 in Bacarra

Cagayan

- N223 in Abulug
- N121 in Abulug
- N101 / N119 at Magapit Interchange, Lal-lo
- N104 in Tuguegarao
- N105 in Tuguegarao
- N51 / N106 in Tuguegarao
- N104 in Tuguegarao

Isabela

- N220-1 in Cabagan (northern terminus)
- N220 in Cabagan
- N220-1 in Cabagan (southern terminus)
- N220-1 in Tumauini
- N53 in Cauayan
- N51 in Santiago
- N108-1 in Santiago
- N108 in Cordon

Nueva Vizcaya

- N109 in Bagabag
- N110 in Aritao
- N114 in Santa Fe

Nueva Ecija

- N56 / N111 in San Jose
- N114 in Santo Domingo
- N111 in Cabanatuan
- N58 in Santa Rosa
- N3 in Gapan

Bulacan

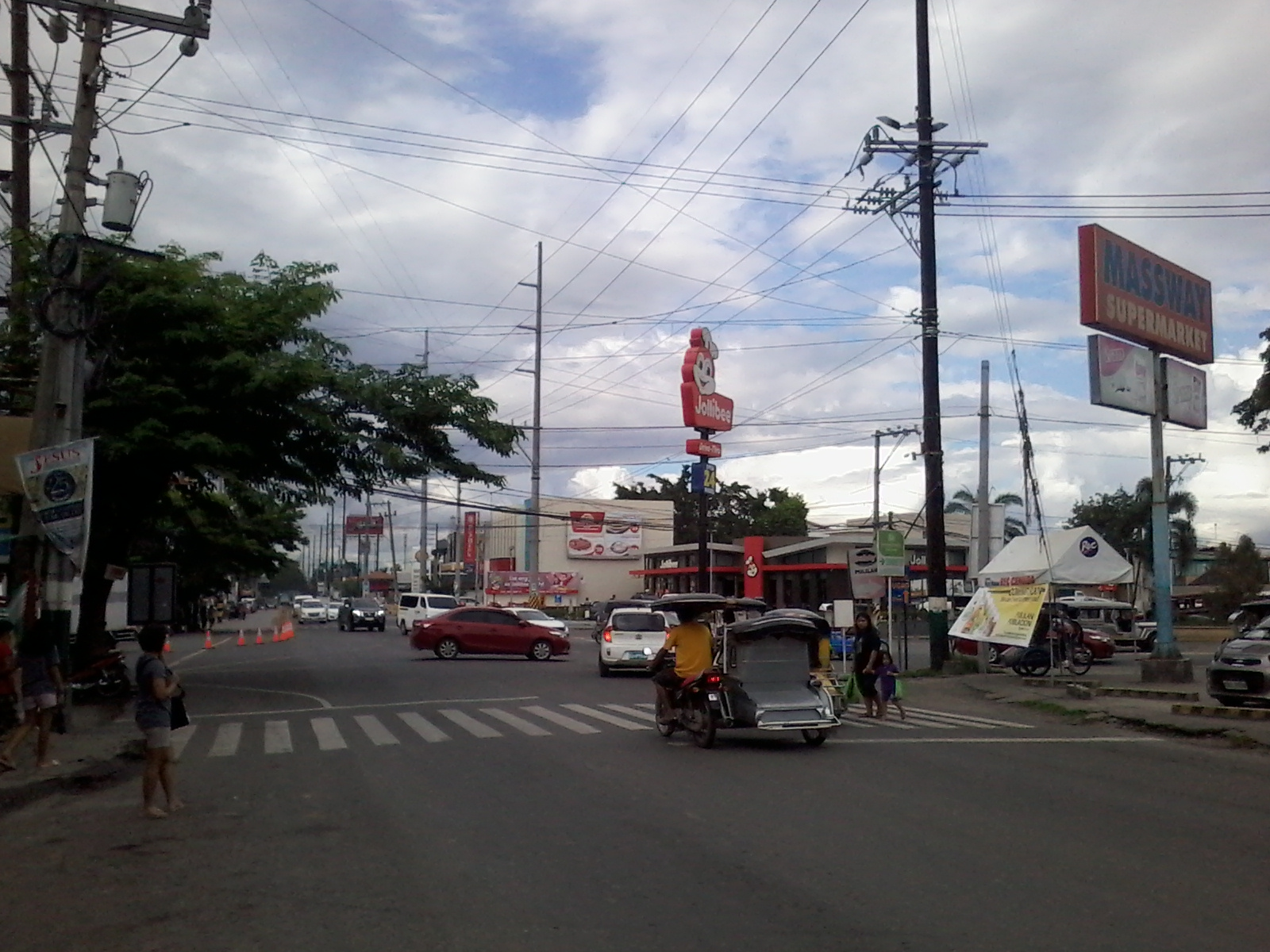
The intersection of Doña Remedios Trinidad Highway (AH26) and Pulilan Regional Road (N115) in Pulilan.

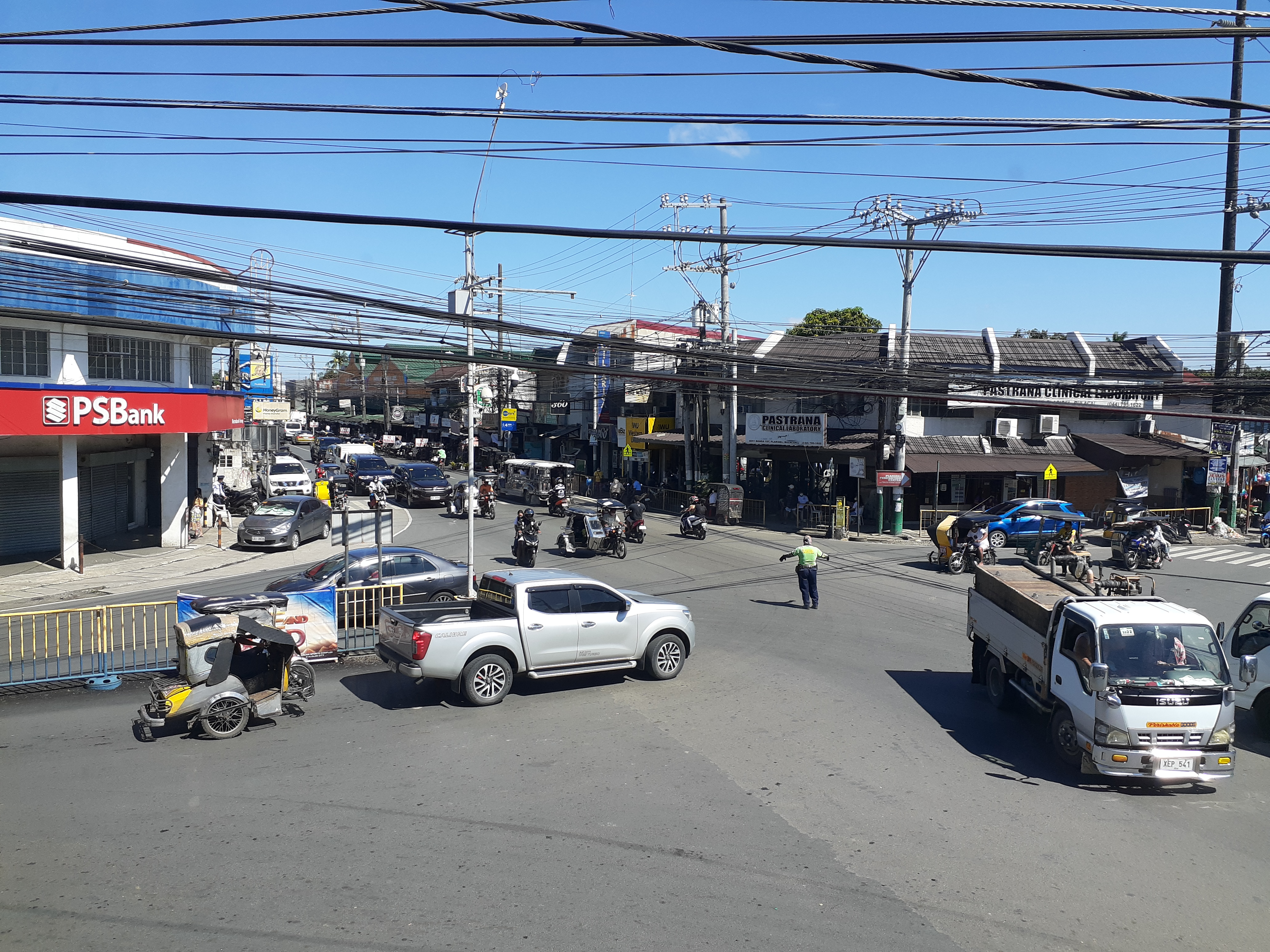
The intersection of Pan-Philippine Highway (AH26), Governor Padilla Street (N116) and General Alejo Santos Highway in Plaridel.

- N247 in San Rafael
- N115 in Pulilan
- N116 in Plaridel
- E1 / N1 in Santa Rita, Guiguinto. Route number change from N1 to E1.
- N247 in Balagtas
- E1 in Balagtas
- N117 in Meycauayan

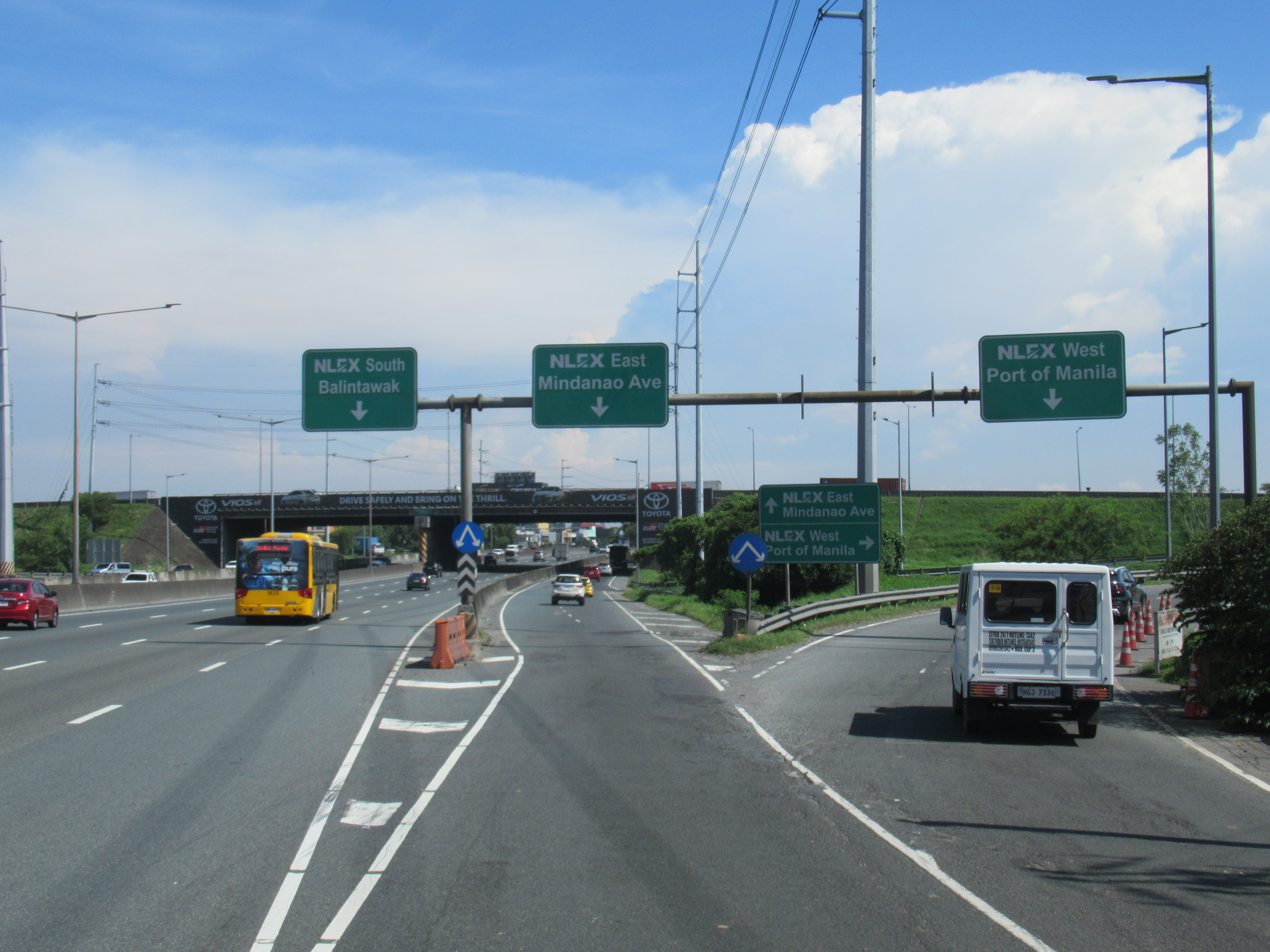
Harbor Link Interchange in Valenzuela

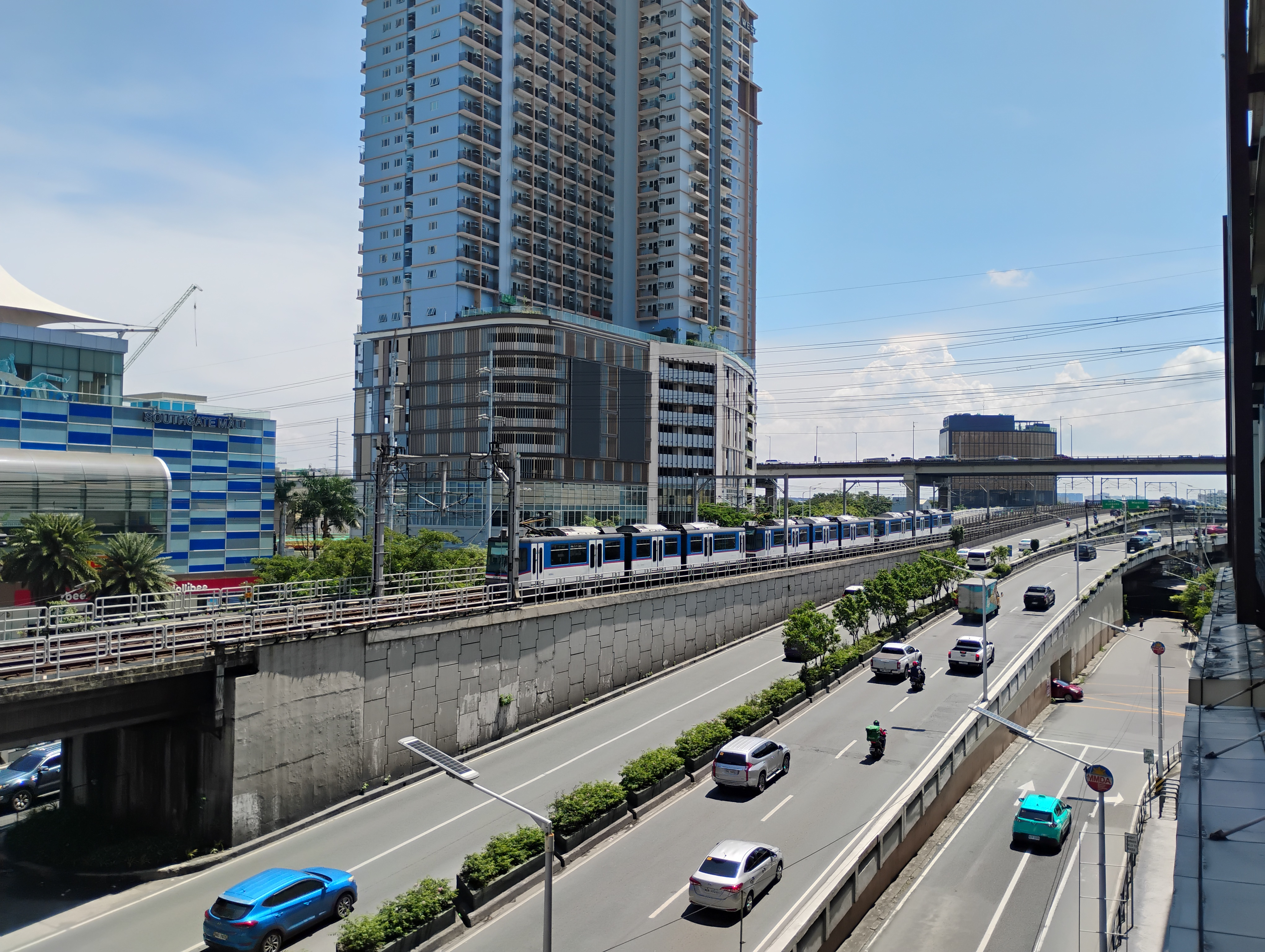
Magallanes Interchange in Makati

Metro Manila

- N118 in Valenzuela
- E5 at Harbor Link Interchange, Valenzuela
- N127 in Quezon City
- N1 / N160 at Balintawak Interchange, Quezon City. Route number change from E1 to N1.
- N127 in Quezon City
- N129 in Quezon City
- N171 / N173 in Quezon City
- N170 in Quezon City
- N172 / N174 in Quezon City
- N180 / N59 in Quezon City
- N185 in Quezon City
- N184 / N60 at Ortigas Interchange in Quezon City and Mandaluyong
- N141 in Mandaluyong
- N190 (Kalayaan Avenue) in Makati
- N191 in Makati
- N190 (Gil Puyat Avenue) in Makati
- N1 / N145 at Magallanes Interchange, Makati. Route number change from N1 to E2.
- E6 in Taguig
- N11 in Taguig
- N63 in Parañaque and Muntinlupa
- N1 in Alabang, Muntinlupa
- E2 (MCX) in Muntinlupa

Cavite

- N65 in Carmona

Laguna (Biñan–Calamba)

- E3 (CALAX) in Biñan
- N420 in Santa Rosa
- N420-1 in Calamba
- E2 / N1 in Calamba. Route number change from E2 to N1.

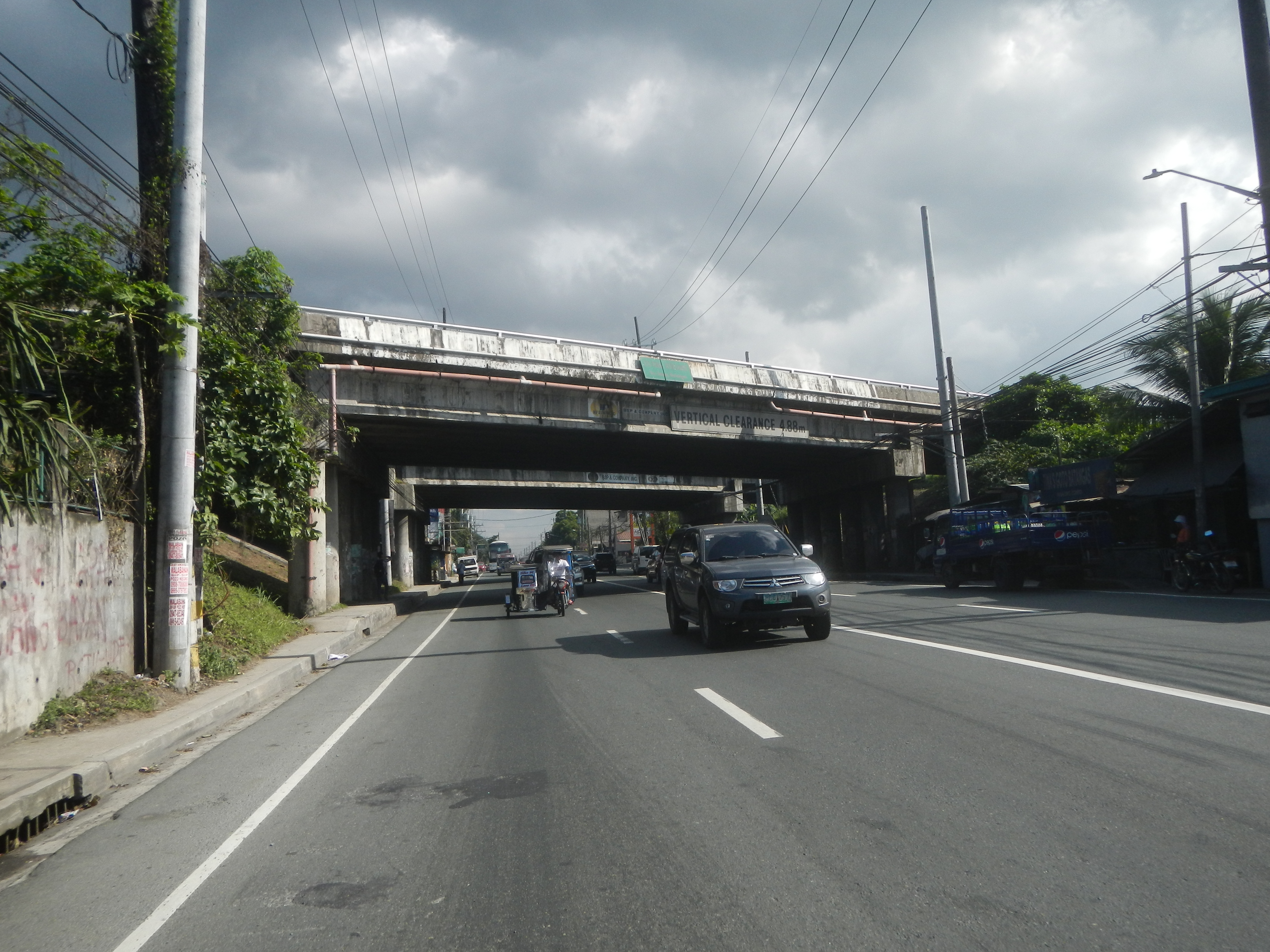
Pan-Philippine Highway (N1/AH26) crossing beneath the STAR Tollway (E2) at Santo Tomas Interchange, Santo Tomas, Batangas

Batangas

- E2 in Santo Tomas
- N421-2 in Santo Tomas (northern terminus)
- N4 / N421-2 in Santo Tomas

Laguna (Alaminos–San Pablo)

- N421-1 in Alaminos (two eastern termini)
- N67 in San Pablo (two southern termini)
- N608-1 in San Pablo

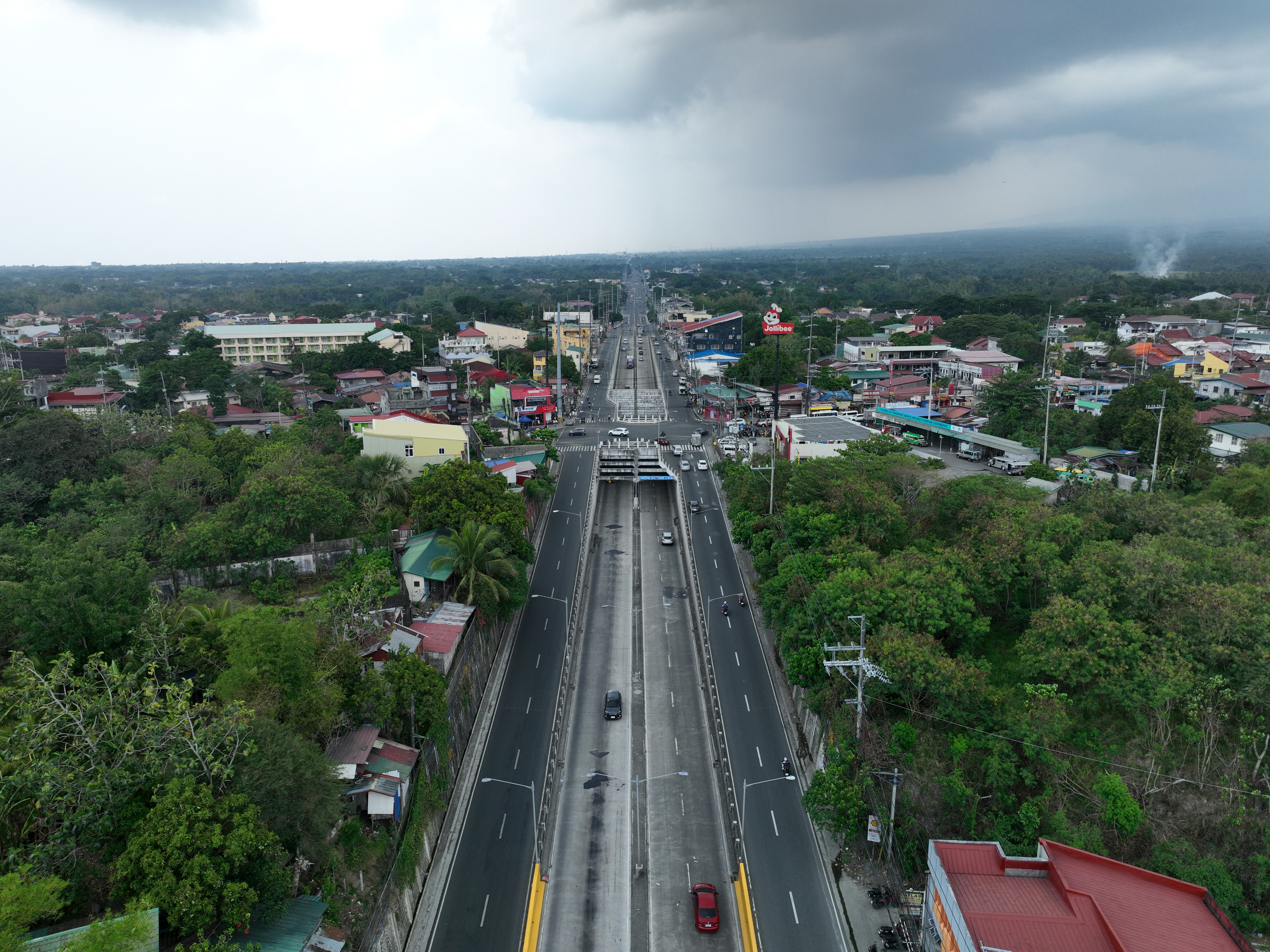
The intersection of Lucena Diversion Road (N1/AH26) and Tayabas–Lucena Road (N603) in Lucena, Quezon

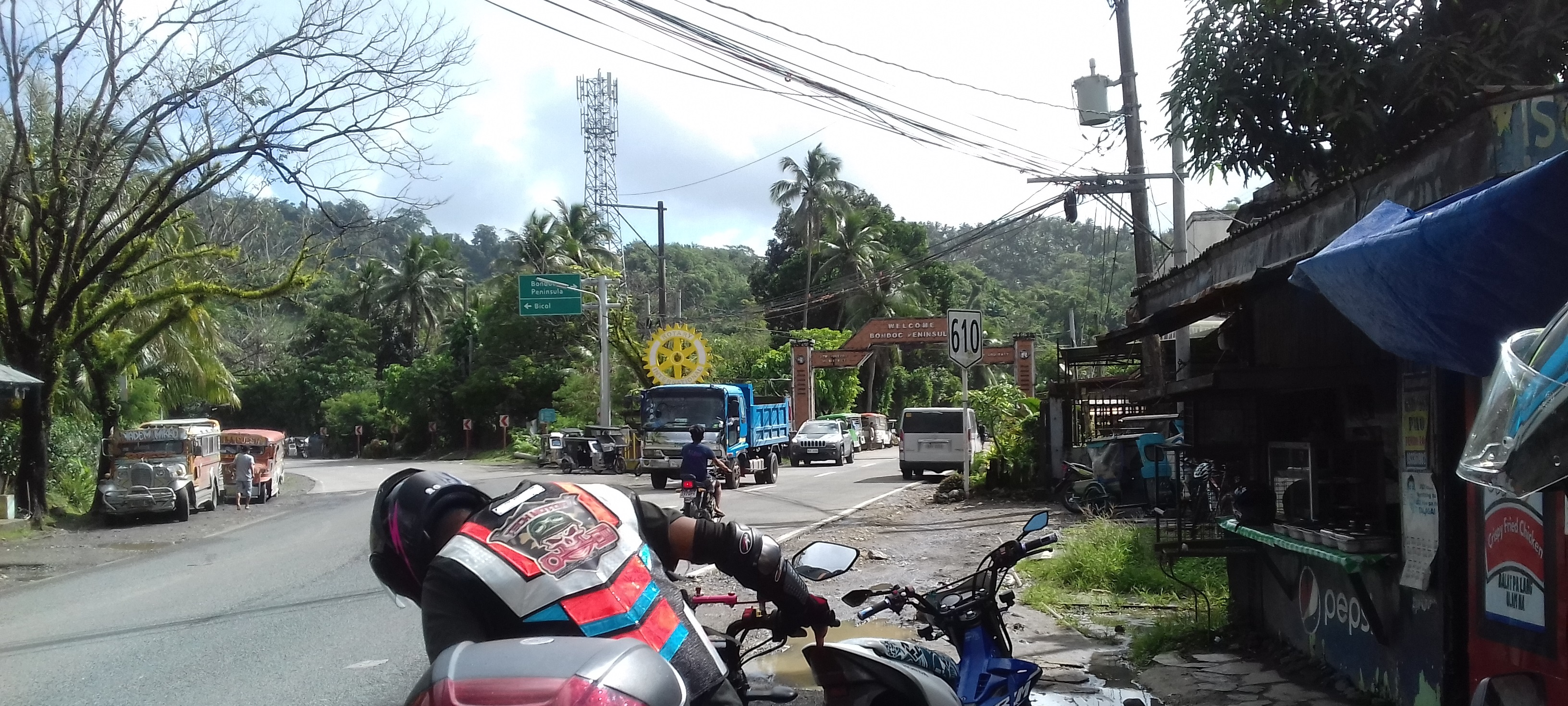
The intersection of Maharlika Highway (N1/AH26) and Pagbilao–Padre Burgos Road (N610) in Pagbilao, Quezon

Quezon

- N608-1 in Tiaong
- N608 in Tiaong (northern terminus)
- N435 in Tiaong
- N608 in Tiaong (southern terminus)
- N609 in Candelaria
- N422-1 in Candelaria
- N609 in Candelaria
- N606 in Sariaya
- N606 in Isabang, Tayabas
- N422 in Isabang, Lucena
- N603 in Gulang-Gulang, Lucena
- N606 in Talipan, Pagbilao
- N610 in Silangang Malicboy, Pagbilao
- N613-2 in Atimonan
- N618-1 in Gumaca (western terminus)
- N613 in Gumaca
- N618-1 in Gumaca (eastern terminus)
- N612-1 in Lopez (western terminus)
- N611 in Lopez
- N612 in Lopez
- N612-1 in Lopez (eastern terminus)
- N657 in Lopez

Camarines Norte

- N68 in Santa Elena
- N620 in Labo
- N621 in Daet (northern & southern termini)

Camarines Sur

- N625 in Lupi
- N626 in Lupi
- N68 in Sipocot
- N623 in Pamplona
- N627 in San Fernando
- N672 in Pili
- N673 in Pili
- N630 in Pili
- N634 in Baao
- N634 in Nabua
- N635 in Bato

Albay

- N638 in Polangui (two northern termini)
- N639 in Ligao
- N636 in Ligao
- N630 in Daraga

Sorsogon

- N642 in Pilar
- N641 in Castilla
- N643 in Sorsogon City (western terminus)
- N644 in Sorsogon City
- N643 in Sorsogon City (eastern terminus)
- N645 in Bulan

Northern Samar

- N670 in Allen

Samar

- N672 in Calbayog
- N673 in Calbayog
- N679 in Calbayog (western & eastern termini)
- N677 in Gandara (northern & southern termini)
- N675 in Catbalogan
- N674 in Paranas
- N670 in Basey
- N670 in Santa Rita

Samar–Leyte boundary

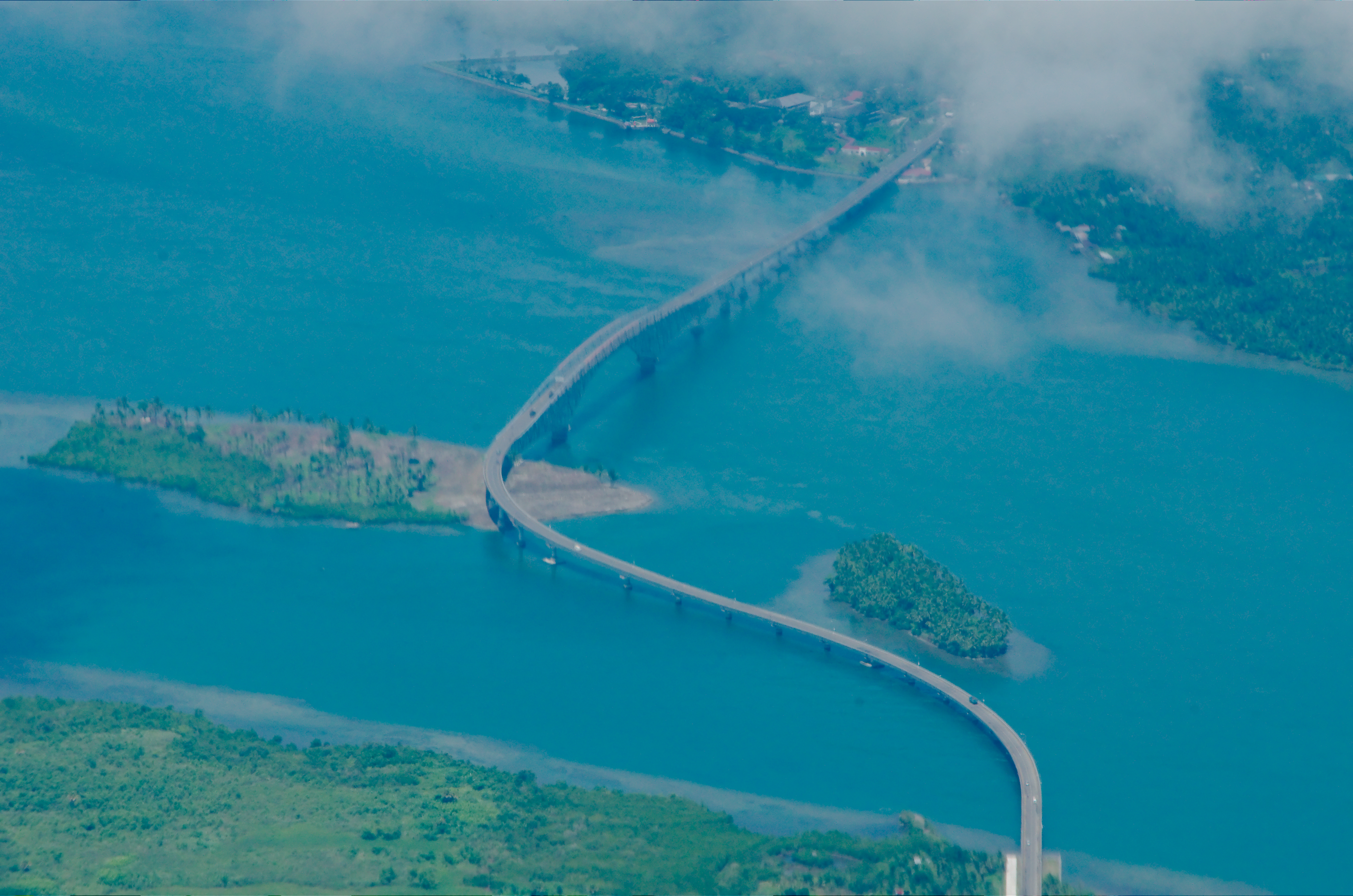
The San Juanico Bridge carries the Pan-Philippine Highway between Samar and Leyte islands

- San Juanico Bridge

Leyte

- N717 in Tacloban (northern terminus)
- N686 in Tacloban
- N687 in Tacloban
- N717 in Tacloban (southern terminus)
- N718 in Palo
- N686 in Palo
- N70 in Palo
- N719 in Palo
- N690 in Abuyog
- N70 in Mahaplag

Southern Leyte

- N692 in Sogod
- N690 in Liloan
- N691 in Liloan

Surigao del Norte

- N901 in Surigao City
- N902 in Placer

Agusan del Norte

- N9 in Butuan
- N951 in Butuan

Agusan del Sur

- N903 in Prosperidad
- N904 in Prosperidad
- N905 in San Francisco
- N904 / N73 in Trento

Davao de Oro

- N906 in Montevista
- N907 in Nabunturan

Davao del Norte

- N908 in Tagum (northern terminus)
- N909 / N74 in Tagum
- N908 in Tagum (southern terminus)
- N910 in Carmen
- N909 in Panabo

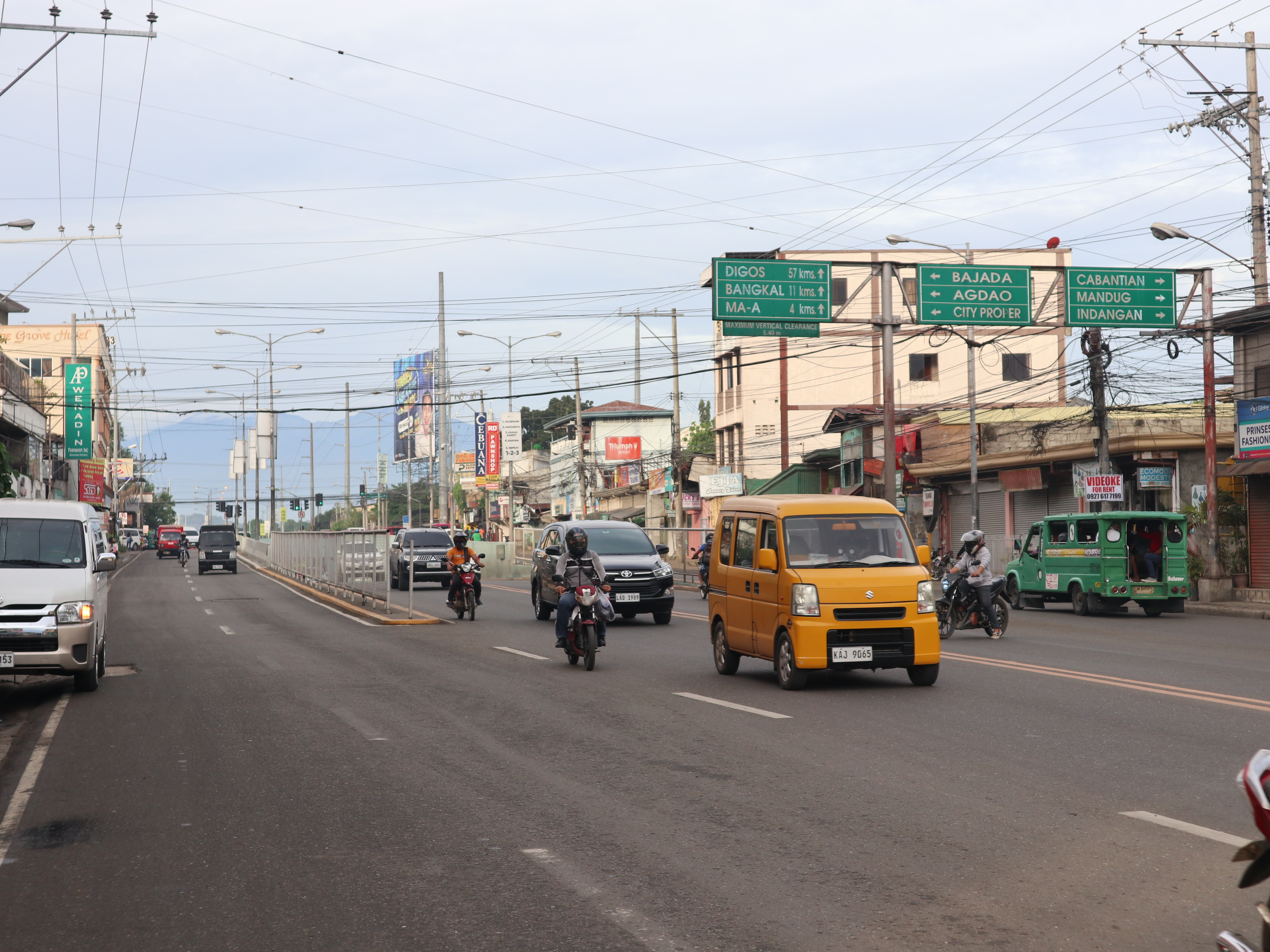
Buhangin Underpass along Carlos P. Garcia National Highway (N1/AH26) at its intersection with Buhangin–Lapanday Road (N918) in Davao City

Davao del Sur

- N918-1 in Davao City
- N1 in Davao City
- N914 in Buhangin, Davao City
- N915 in Buhangin, Davao City
- N916 in Agdao, Davao City (eastern terminus)
- N917 in Agdao, Davao City
- N918 in Agdao & Buhangin, Davao City
- N919 / N920 in Poblacion, Davao City
- N919 in Poblacion, Davao City
- N920 in Poblacion, Davao City
- N921 in Talomo, Davao City
- N916 in Talomo, Davao City (western terminus)
- N1 in Davao City
- AH 26 (N10) in Davao City
- N916-1 in Davao City
- N923 in Digos (northern terminus)
- N75 in Digos
- N924 in Digos
- N923 in Hagonoy (southern terminus)
- N930 in Sulop

South Cotabato

- N931 in General Santos (eastern terminus)
- N930 in General Santos
- N935 in General Santos
- N931 in General Santos

Sultan Kudarat

- N940 in Tacurong
- N932 in Surallah
- N76 in Isulan
- N941 in Esperanza

Maguindanao del Sur

- N933 in Datu Saudi Ampatuan

Maguindanao del Norte

- N75 in Sultan Kudarat
- N935 in Datu Odin Sinsuat
- N936 in Datu Odin Sinsuat
- N937 in Sultan Mastura
- N937 in Parang
- N939 in Parang

Lanao del Sur

- N77 in Malabang

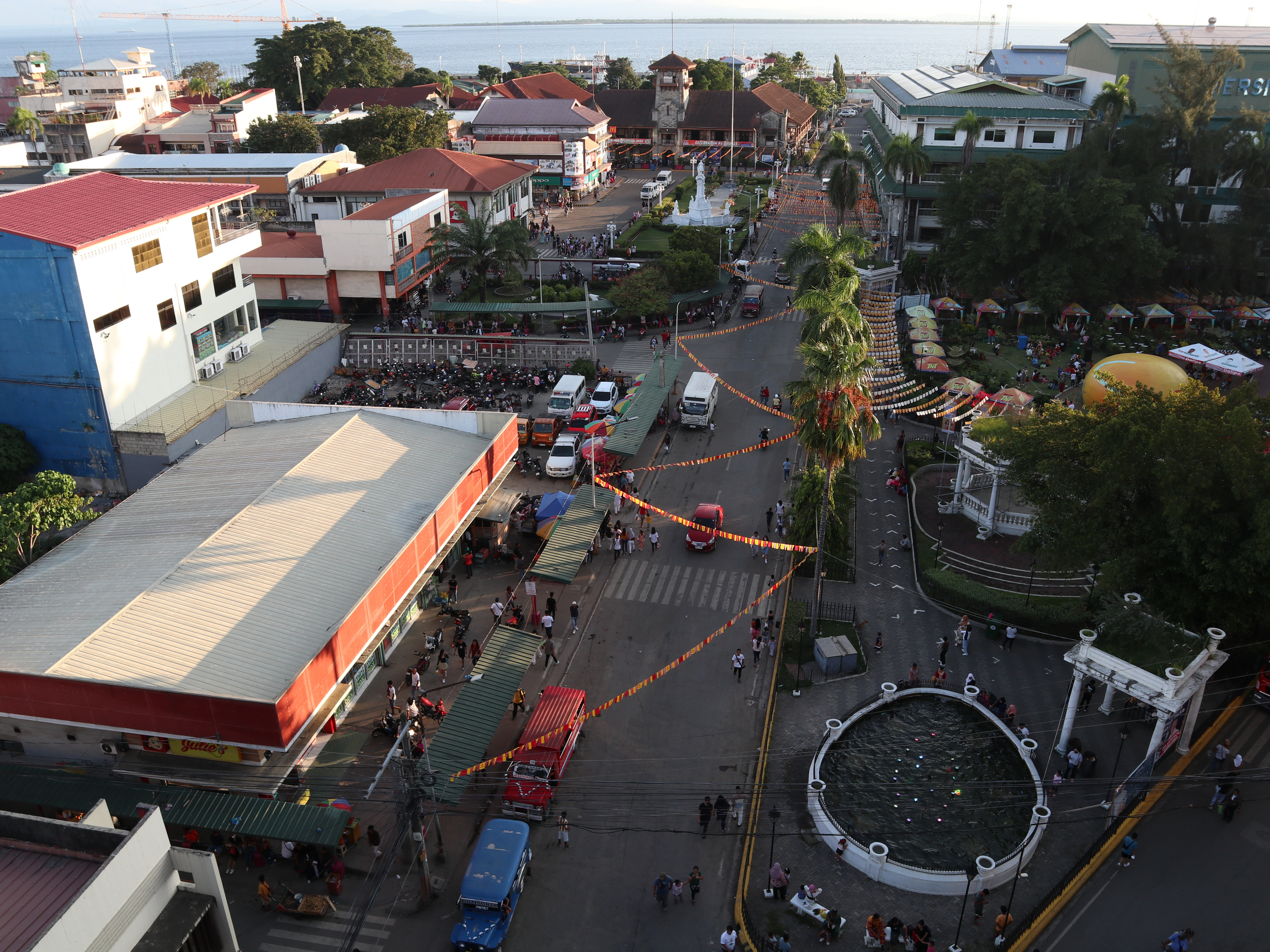
Aerial view of AH26 towards its southern terminus in Zamboanga City

Zamboanga del Sur

- N78 in Labangan
- N965-1 in Pagadian
- N965-2 in Pagadian
- N961-4 in Dumalinao
- N961-1 in Tigbao

Zamboanga Sibugay

- N961-2 in Diplahan
- N961-1 in Imelda (two separate segments)
- N79 in Ipil

Zamboanga City

- N972
- N968
- N966 / N970 / N971. Southern terminus of AH26.

=== Auxiliary routes ===
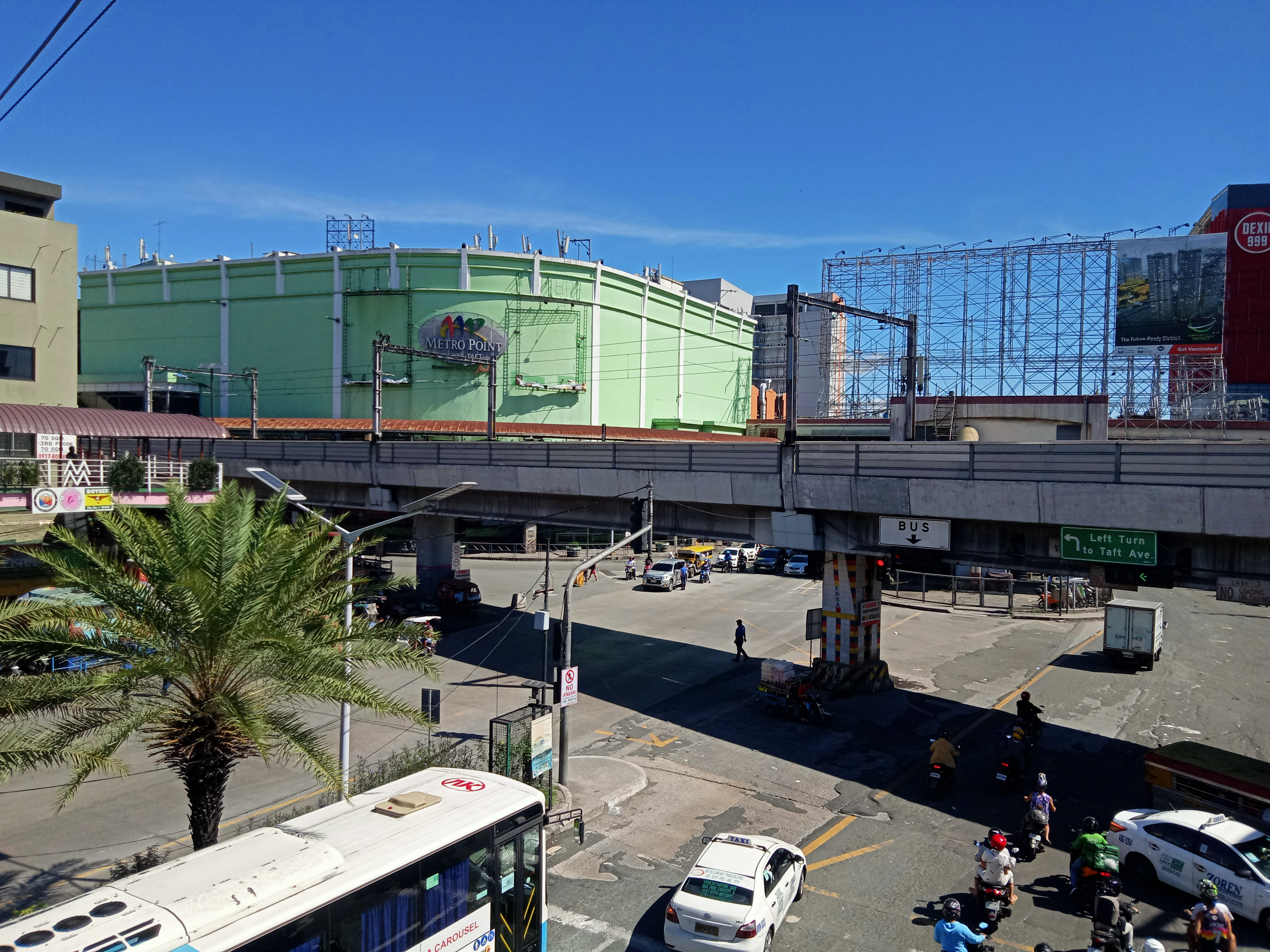
Pasay Rotonda, an intersection of N1/AH26 (EDSA) and N170 (Taft Avenue) in Pasay

Metro Manila (western route) – part of N1 and N120

- N1 / N160 / E1 in Balintawak, Quezon City. Northern terminus of AH26 auxiliary route in Metro Manila.
- N1 / N150 in Caloocan. Route number change from N1 to N120.
- N130 in Navotas
- E5 in Navotas
- N140 in Tondo, Manila
- N145 in Tondo and San Nicolas, Manila
- N150 in Ermita and Intramuros, Manila
- N155 in Ermita, Manila
- N156 in Ermita, Manila
- N140 in Malate, Manila
- N190 in Pasay
- N61 in Pasay. Route number change from N120 to N1.
- N170 in Pasay
- N171 (Aurora Boulevard) in Pasay
- N1 / N145 / E2 at Magallanes Interchange, Makati. Southern terminus of AH26 auxiliary route in Metro Manila.

Visayas (western route) – part of N70

- N1 in Palo. Northern terminus of AH26 auxiliary route in Visayas.
- N718 in Palo
- N681 in Capoocan
- N683 in Ormoc
- N684 in Ormoc
- N70 in Ormoc

Mindanao – part of N10 and N9

- N1 in Davao City. Southern terminus of AH26 auxiliary route in Mindanao.
- N942 in Arakan
- N943 in Maramag
- N912-1 in Maramag (southern terminus of southern section)
- N912 in Valencia
- N912-1 in Valencia (northern terminus of southern section)
- N912-1 in Malaybalay (northern & southern terminus of northern section)
- N946 in Cagayan de Oro
- N862 in Cagayan de Oro
- N946 in Cagayan de Oro
- N945 / N9 in Cagayan de Oro
- N862 in Cagayan de Oro
- N946 in Cagayan de Oro

== In popular culture ==
As the primary transport backbone of the Philippines, the highway is frequently featured in local media, often as a symbol of the "long journey" or national connection.

- Television: The highway was the central setting for the Maalaala Mo Kaya episode titled "Tsinelas" (2011), which dramatized the real-life story of two orphaned brothers who walked from Metro Manila to Samar to find their relatives. The episode starred AJ Perez and Bugoy Cariño.
- Music: The highway is the namesake for various travel-themed media, including "The Pan-Philippine Highway Road Trip" curated collections which highlight the route's significance in OPM culture as a route for touring bands.
- Journalism and Documentaries: The highway has been the subject of multiple investigative reports regarding national infrastructure, such as The Manila Times podcast "Maharlika Highway: No more a royal road," which explores its historical and cultural shift from the 1970s to the present.

== See also ==
- Transportation in the Philippines
- Department of Public Works and Highways
- Asian Highway Network
- Philippine Nautical Highway System

== Notes ==
=== Alternative names ===
Pan-Philippine Highway also has alternative names, especially locally within the poblacion of respective town and cities.
