= Makilala–Allah Valley Road =

Road in the Philippines

Makilala–Allah Valley Road
- Digos–Sultan Kudarat Road
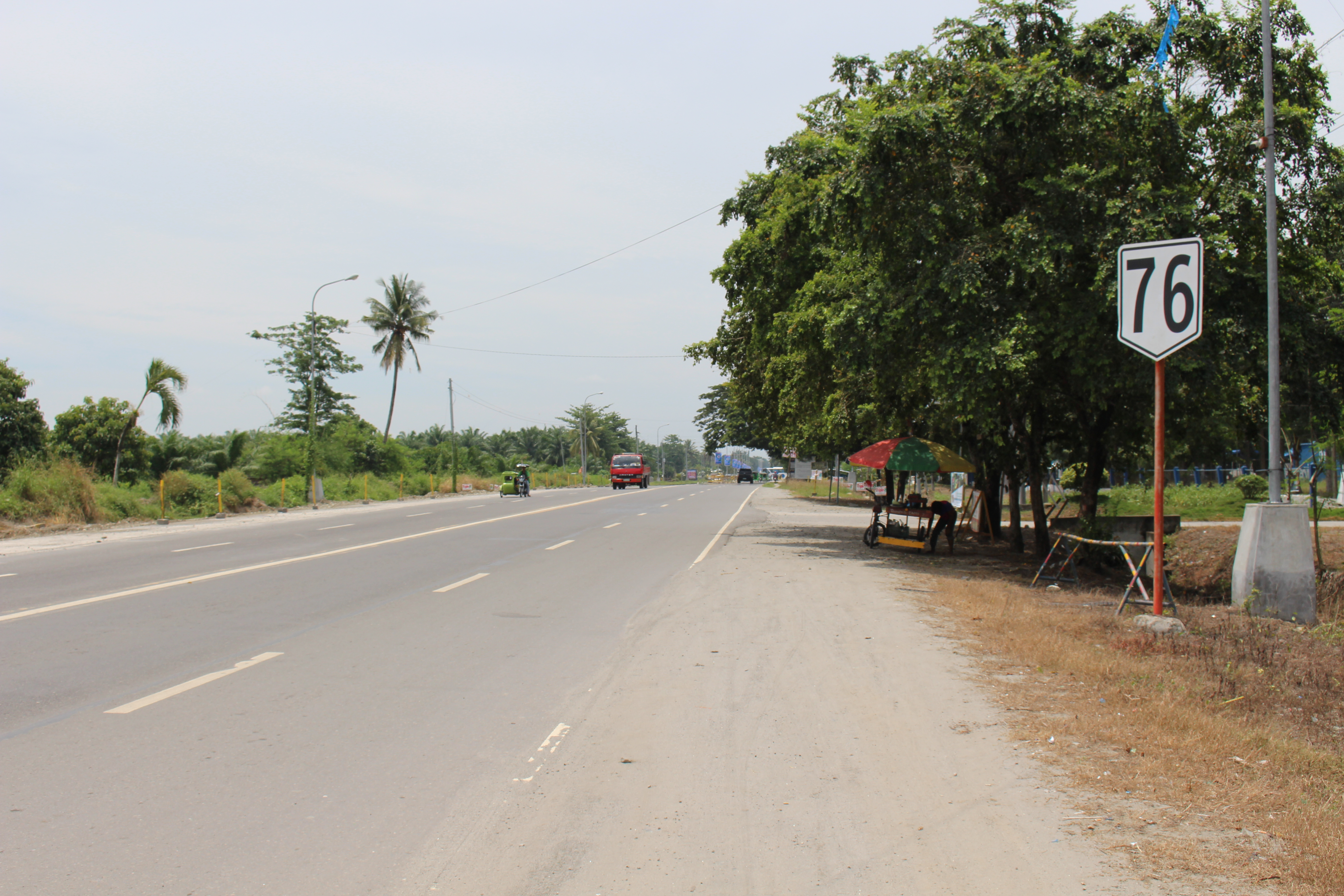
- Reassurance Marker at Isulan, Sultan Kudarat

Route information
- Maintained by Department of Public Works and Highways
- Length: 72 km (45 mi)
- Component highways: N76

Major junctions
- From: N75 (Davao–Cotabato Road) at Makilala
- N940 (Makar–Dulawan–Midsayap–Marbel Road) at Tacurong
- To: AH 26 (N1) (Maharlika Highway) at Isulan

Location
- Country: Philippines
- Provinces: Cotabato, Maguindanao del Sur, Sultan Kudarat
- Major cities: Tacurong City
- Towns: Makilala, M'lang, Tulunan, Datu Paglas, Buluan, Mangudadatu, President Quirino, Isulan

Highway system
- Roads in the Philippines; Highways; Expressways; List
← N75	→ N77

The Makilala–Allah Valley Road, is a 72-kilometer (45 mi) two-to-four lane highway in the Philippines that connects the provinces of Cotabato, Maguindanao del Sur, and Sultan Kudarat. It is classified as a national primary highway for Mindanao. It also connects to the Maharlika Highway in Tacurong City. It lessens the travel time from North Cotabato to Sultan Kudarat.

The entire highway is designated as National Route 76 (N76) of the Philippine highway network.

== Route description ==
=== Makilala to Datu Paglas ===
The eastern section of N76 is at Makilala that links up to N75. It traverses the municipalities of M'lang and Tulunan in North Cotabato. It traverses towards Maguindanao del Sur into Datu Paglas at 39-kilometre (24 mi).

=== Datu Paglas to Tacurong ===
At Datu Paglas, there is a roundabout that links N76 into a national tertiary highway, Datu Paglas–Columbio Road. It traverses into the municipalities of Buluan and Mangudadatu. It traverses into Sultan Kudarat at the municipality of President Quirino and into Tacurong at 22-kilometre (14 mi).

=== Tacurong to Isulan ===
At Tacurong, there is a roundabout that links to N940 and AH26. It then traverses into its western section towards Isulan at 11-kilometre (6.8 mi).

== Intersections ==
Intersections are numbered by kilometer post, with the Marawi city proper designated as kilometre 0.

Province	City/Municipality	km	mi	Destinations	Notes
Sultan Kudarat	Tacurong			N940 (Midsayap–Marbel Road)	Roundabout
Sultan Kudarat	Tacurong			AH 26 (N1) (Maharlika Highway)	
1.000 mi = 1.609 km; 1.000 km = 0.621 mi
