= Sorsogon Diversion Road =

National secondary road in the Philippines

Sorsogon Diversion Road
- Salvador H. Escudero III Diversion Road

Route information
- Maintained by Department of Public Works and Highways – Sorsogon 1st District Engineering Office
- Length: 7.445 km (4.626 mi)
- Component highways: N643

Major junctions
- West end: AH 26 (N1) (Maharlika Highway)
- N644 (Bacon–Manito Road)
- East end: AH 26 (N1) (Maharlika Highway)

Location
- Country: Philippines
- Provinces: Sorsogon
- Major cities: Sorsogon City

Highway system
- Roads in the Philippines; Highways; Expressways; List
← N642	→ N644

Sorsogon Diversion Road, officially known as Salvador H. Escudero III Diversion Road, is a 7.4-kilometer (4.6 mi), national secondary road in the city of Sorsogon of the Sorsogon province in the Philippines. Its official name, enacted in 2018, derives from Salvador Escudero III, who served as the province's 1st district representative and the country's agriculture secretary.

The entire road is designated as National Route 643 (N643) of the Philippine highway network.

== Route description ==
Like most of the diversion roads in the country, the road bypasses the city proper of Sorsogon as an alternate route of Maharlika Highway, which goes straight to the city proper.

== Notable buildings ==
From the west:

- Sorsogon Provincial Hospital
- Wilcon Depot
- Padre Pio Hospital of Sorsogon
- Sorsogon City Government Center

== Intersections ==
The entire route is located in Sorsogon City. Intersections are numbered by kilometre post, with the Rizal Park in Manila designated as kilometer 0.

km	mi	Destinations	Notes
577.386	358.771	AH 26 (N1) (Maharlika Highway) – Manila, Legazpi, Naga, Lucena	Western terminus.
		N644 (Bacon–Manito Road) – Manito, Prieto Diaz, Sorsogon City Proper	
584.445	363.157	AH 26 (N1) (Maharlika Highway) – Matnog, Casiguran, Juban, Irosin	Eastern terminus.
1.000 mi = 1.609 km; 1.000 km = 0.621 mi
