= Bulan–Magallanes Road =

Road in Sorsogon, Philippines

Bulan–Magallanes Road
- Gate–Bulan Airport Road

Route information
- Maintained by Department of Public Works and Highways; Sorsogon 2nd District Engineering Office
- Length: 15 km (9.3 mi)
- Component highways: N645

Major junctions
- East end: AH 26 (N1) in Matnog, Sorsogon
- N646 (Bulan Seaport Road) in Bulan, Sorsogon
- West end: Bulan Airport

Location
- Country: Philippines
- Provinces: Sorsogon
- Towns: Matnog, Bulan

Highway system
- Roads in the Philippines; Highways; Expressways; List
| ← N644 | → N646 |

Bulan–Magallanes Road is a 15-kilometer (9.3 mi), national secondary road in Sorsogon province of the Philippines.

The entire road is designated as National Route 645 (N645) of the Philippine highway network.

== Route description ==
The road starts from the junction of Maharlika Highway in Irosin–Matnog boundary as its eastern terminus, where the road officially known as the Gate–Bulan Airport Road by DPWH. It provides access to the town proper of Bulan. Within the town proper, the route continues at the T-junction to the right, where the eastern terminus of Bulan Seaport Road (N646) is located to the left that connects to Bulan Seaport. Currently, the numbered route ends at the Bulan Airport. The rest of the route remained unnumbered and rest of the road to Magallanes is not yet classified as a tertiary national road by DPWH.

== Intersections ==
The entire route is located in Sorsogon. Intersections are numbered by kilometre post, with Rizal Park in Manila designated as kilometre 0.

| City/Municipality | km | mi | Destinations | Notes |
|---|---|---|---|---|
| Matnog | 629 | 391 | AH 26 (N1) (Maharlika Highway) – Manila, Sorsogon City, Samar Island (via ferry), Matnog Town Proper, Matnog Ferry Terminal | Eastern terminus. |
| Bulan | | | N646 (Bulan Seaport Road) – Bulan Seaport, Masbate City (via ferry) | Entire numbered route known as Eastern Nautical Highway. |
| Bulan | 644 | 400 | Bulan Airport | Current western terminus. The rest of the road leads to Magallanes is not yet classified as a tertiary national road. |
1.000 mi = 1.609 km; 1.000 km = 0.621 mi
