= Sarangani–Sultan Kudarat Coastal Road =

Road in the Philippines

Sarangani–Sultan Kudarat Coastal Road
- Awang–Upi–Lebak–Kalamansig–Palimbang–Sarangani Road
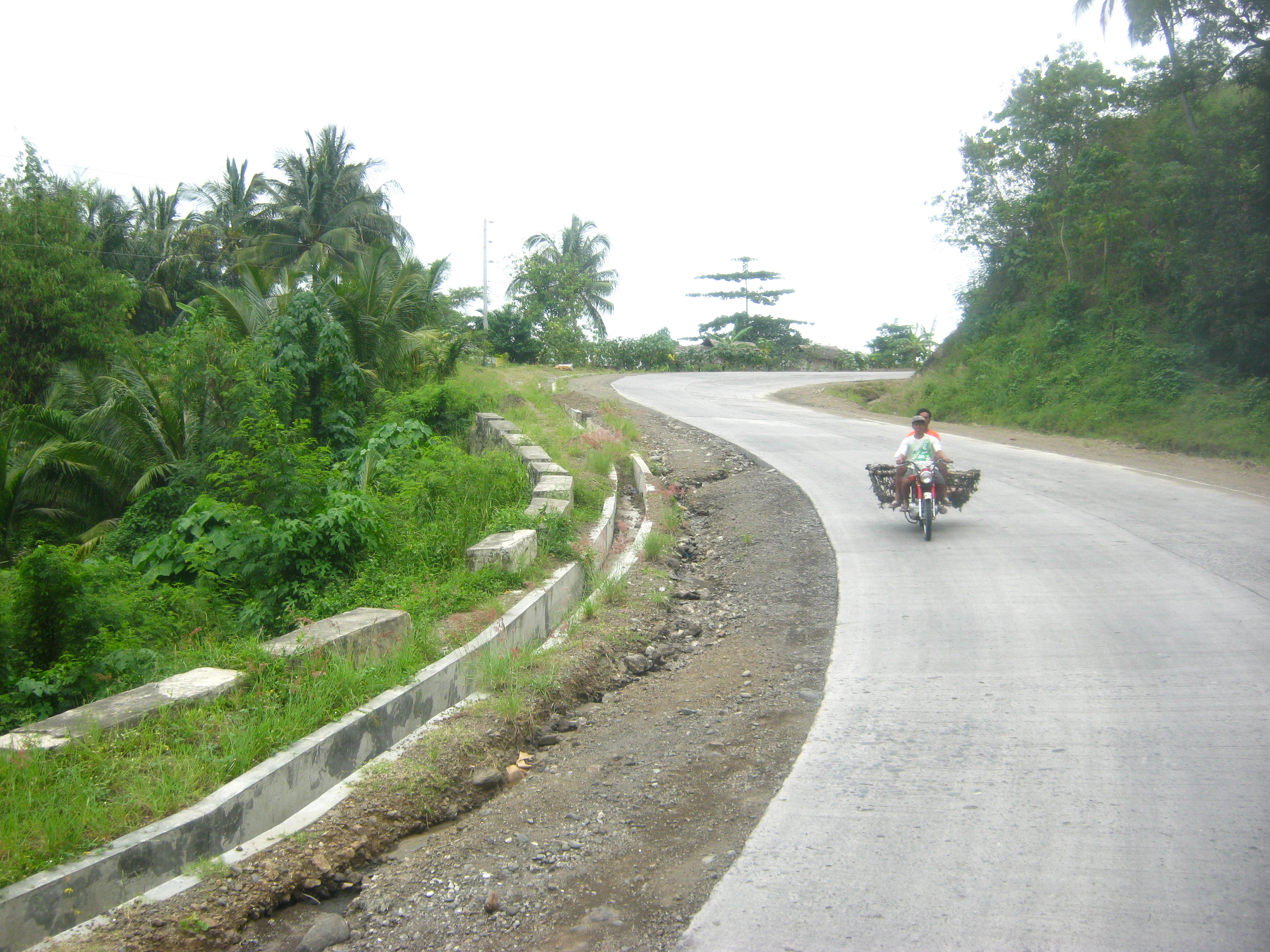
- Section of the Road at General Santos

Route information
- Maintained by Department of Public Works and Highways
- Length: 323 km (201 mi)
- Component highways: N935

Major junctions
- North end: AH 26 (N1) (Maharlika Highway) at Datu Odin Sinsuat
- N941 (Ninoy Aquino–Lebak–Kalamansig Road) at Palimbang; N932 (Filipino-American Friendship Avenue) at General Santos
- South end: AH 26 (N1) (Maharlika Highway) at General Santos

Location
- Country: Philippines
- Major cities: General Santos
- Towns: Datu Odin Sinsuat, Upi, South Upi, Lebak, Kalamansig, Palimbang, Maitum, Kiamba, Maasim

Highway system
- Roads in the Philippines; Highways; Expressways; List
← N932	→ N940

The Sarangani–Sultan Kudarat Coastal Road or Awang–Upi–Lebak–Kalamansig–Palimbang–Sarangani Road is a 323-kilometre (201 mi), two-to-four lane national secondary road, connecting the provinces of Maguindanao del Norte, Maguindanao del Sur, Sultan Kudarat, Sarangani, and South Cotabato. It starts from Datu Odin Sinsuat in Maguindanao del Norte and ends at General Santos in South Cotabato.

The entire road is designated as National Route 935 (N935) of the Philippine highway network.

== Intersections ==
Intersections are numbered by kilometre post, with the Marawi city proper designated as kilometre 0.

Province	City/Municipality	km	mi	Destinations	Notes
Sultan Kudarat	Palimbang			N941 (Ninoy Aquino–Lebak–Kalamansig Road)	
South Cotabato	General Santos			N932 (Filipino-American Friendship Avenue)	
1.000 mi = 1.609 km; 1.000 km = 0.621 mi
