= Cuevas–Bislig Road =

Road in the Philippines

Cuevas–Bislig Road

Route information
- Maintained by Department of Public Works and Highways
- Length: 46 km (29 mi)
- Component highways: N73

Major junctions
- From: AH 26 (N1) / N904 (Maharlika Highway) in Trento
- To: N902 (Surigao–Davao Coastal Road) in Bislig

Location
- Country: Philippines
- Provinces: Agusan del Sur and Surigao del Sur
- Major cities: Bislig
- Towns: Trento

Highway system
- Roads in the Philippines; Highways; Expressways; List
← N70	→ N74

The Cuevas–Bislig Road is a 46-kilometer (29 mi), two-lane national primary highway that connects the provinces of Agusan del Sur and Surigao del Sur. This highway also connects to the Maharlika Highway in Barangay Cuevas, Trento, Agusan del Sur. It lessens the travel time from the southern part of Agusan del Sur to Bislig in Surigao del Sur.

The highway forms part of National Route 73 (N73) of the Philippine highway network.
