= Surigao–Davao Coastal Road =

Highway in Mindanao, Philippines

Surigao–Davao Coastal Road
- President Diosdado P. Macapagal Highway

Route information
- Maintained by Department of Public Works and Highways
- Length: 677 km (421 mi)
- Component highways: N902 from Placer to Mati; N74 from Mati to Tagum

Major junctions
- North end: AH 26 (N1) in Placer, Surigao del Norte
- N903 (Payasan–Los Arcos Road) in Lianga, Surigao del Sur; N905 (San Francisco–Bahi–Barobo Road) in Barobo, Surigao del Sur; N73 (Cuevas–Bislig Road) in Bislig; N906 (Compostela–Cateel Road) in Cateel, Davao Oriental; N907 (Mati–Maragusan Road) in Mati
- South end: AH 26 (N1) / N909 (Maharlika Highway) in Tagum

Location
- Country: Philippines
- Provinces: Surigao del Norte, Surigao del Sur, Davao Oriental, Davao de Oro, Davao del Norte
- Major cities: Bislig, Tandag, Mati, Tagum
- Towns: Placer, Bacuag, Gigaquit, Claver, Carrascal, Cantilan, Madrid, Carmen, Lanuza, Cortes, Tago, Bayabas, Cagwait, Marihatag, San Agustin, Lianga, Barobo, Tagbina, Hinatuan, Lingig, Boston, Cateel, Baganga, Caraga, Manay, Tarragona, San Isidro, Lupon, Banaybanay, Pantukan, Mabini, Maco

Highway system
- Roads in the Philippines; Highways; Expressways; List
← N73	→ N75

The Surigao–Davao Coastal Road or the President Diosdado P. Macapagal Highway is a 677-kilometer (421 mi), two-to-six lane highway that connects the provinces of Surigao del Norte, Surigao del Sur, Davao Oriental, Davao de Oro, and Davao del Norte. It connects the Maharlika Highway in Placer, Surigao del Norte to the Agusan in Tagum. Running along the eastern coast of Mindanao, it is one of the longest roads in the Philippines.

The road forms part of National Route 902 (N902) from Placer to Mati and National Route 74 (N74) from Mati to Tagum of the Philippine highway network.

== Intersections ==
Intersections are numbered by kilometer post, with the Marawi city proper designated as kilometer 0.

Province	City/Municipality	km	mi	Destinations	Notes
Davao del Norte	Tagum			AH 26 (N1) (Davao–Agusan National Highway)	Southern terminus.
Davao Oriental	Mati			N907 (Mati-Maragusan Road)	Route changes from N902 to N74.
Surigao del Norte	Placer			AH 26 (N1) (Maharlika Highway)	Northern terminus.
1.000 mi = 1.609 km; 1.000 km = 0.621 mi
