= Wright–Taft Road =

Road in the Philippines

Wright-Taft Road

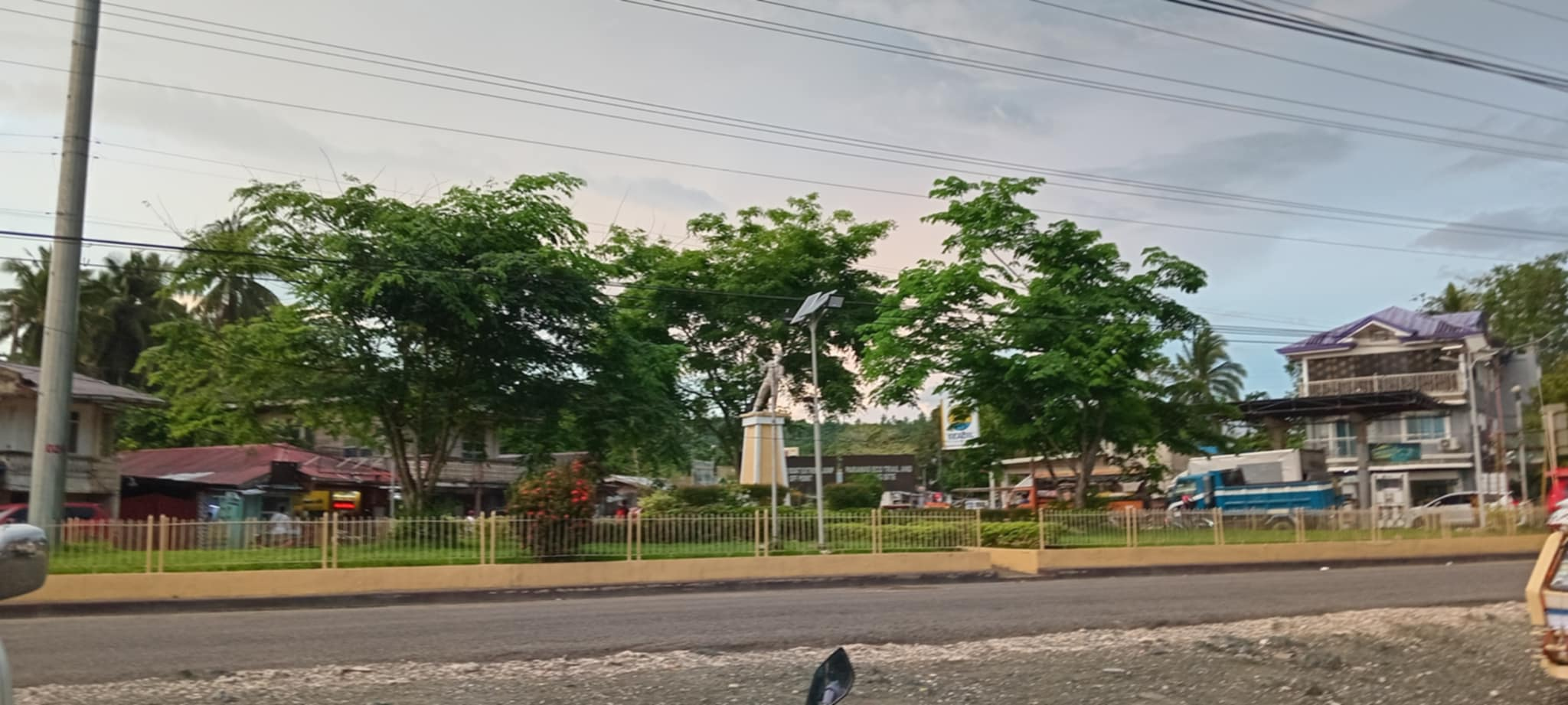
- Crossing of the Wright-Taft Highway with the Maharlika Highway seen in Paranas, Samar.

Route information
- Length: 62 km (39 mi)

Major junctions
- From: N670 (Jct Taft-Oras-Sn Policarpo-Arteche Rd) in Taft, Eastern Samar
- To: N1 (Maharlika Highway) in Paranas

Location
- Country: Philippines
- Provinces: Eastern Samar, Samar
- Towns: Taft, Hinabangan, Paranas

Highway system
- Roads in the Philippines; Highways; Expressways; List

Wright–Taft Road is a road crossing a part of Eastern Samar and the province of Samar. Its designated route number is 674. The highway originates from an intersection with the N670 highway in Taft, Eastern Samar before entering the province of Samar and crossing the municipalities of Hinabangan and Paranas before ending in the Pan-Philippine Highway. The highway was planned in 1908, with a portion being finished in 1928. In the following decades, the road was paved and rehabilitated. Because of multiple typhoons, it has also been closed.

== Route description ==
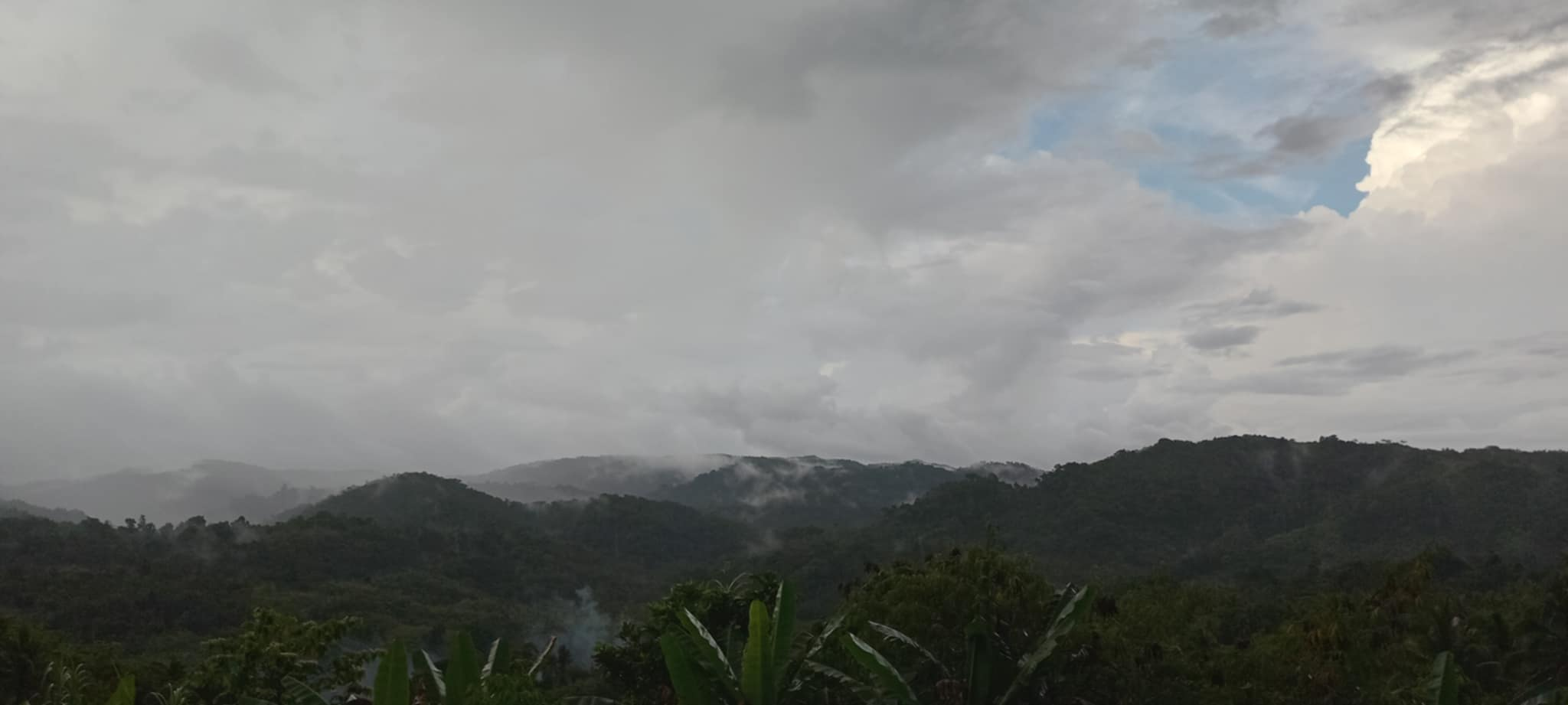
View of Samar Island Park from the side of the Wright-Taft Highway.

Originating from an intersection with the Jct Taft-Oras-San Policarpo-Arteche Road, the Eastern Samar portion is 30 kilometres (19 miles) in length. The road starts slightly far from downtown Taft. The road tracks southwest, entering the community of Lomatud. The road then tracks south before turning west. The road encounters multiple mountains, encountering the Loop-de-Loop Bridge, where the road turns under itself. In the Taft portion of the highway, it encounters the Danao and Lumatod Bridges. Shortly after, the road enters the Samar Island Park and eventually the province of Samar. The Samar portion is 32 km (20 mi). For a short stretch of 9 km (5.6 mi), the highway enters the municipality of Hinabangan. It encounters Military Camp Eugenio S. Daza before entering Paranas. The road directs southwest. The road has an intersection with the San Jose de Buan Road, which leads to the municipality of San Jose de Buan. Shortly after, the road ends at the Pan-Philippine Highway in Paranas.

== History ==
The first mention of the highway was in 1908, during the planning and conception of the road in a report by the Government of the Philippines. By 1928, a section of the road was already built. In a July 1987 report, the road was reported to have been upgraded to asphalt concrete. An aerial inspection of the road was conducted during a meeting of the cabinet of President Fidel Ramos in Borongan on July 12, 1996. The road was included in a program for the rehabilitation of highways for fast delivery on September 1, 1996. On January 6, 2020, two sections of the road in Binaloan, Taft, were closed due to landslides. On June 3, 2021, a section of the road in Binaloan was closed due to the possibility of landslide from Tropical Storm Choi-wan, locally named Dante. On October 5, the road was closed due to landslides by Tropical Storm Lionrock, named as Lannie. On October 28, 2022, the road was closed due to possible landslides on the onslaught of Tropical Storm Nalgae, locally Paeng. On March 20, 2025, half of the road were closed in Binaloan and other parts because of the possibility of landslides due to heavy rains.
