= Mahaplag =

Municipality in Leyte, Philippines

- Municipality
- Municipality of Mahaplag
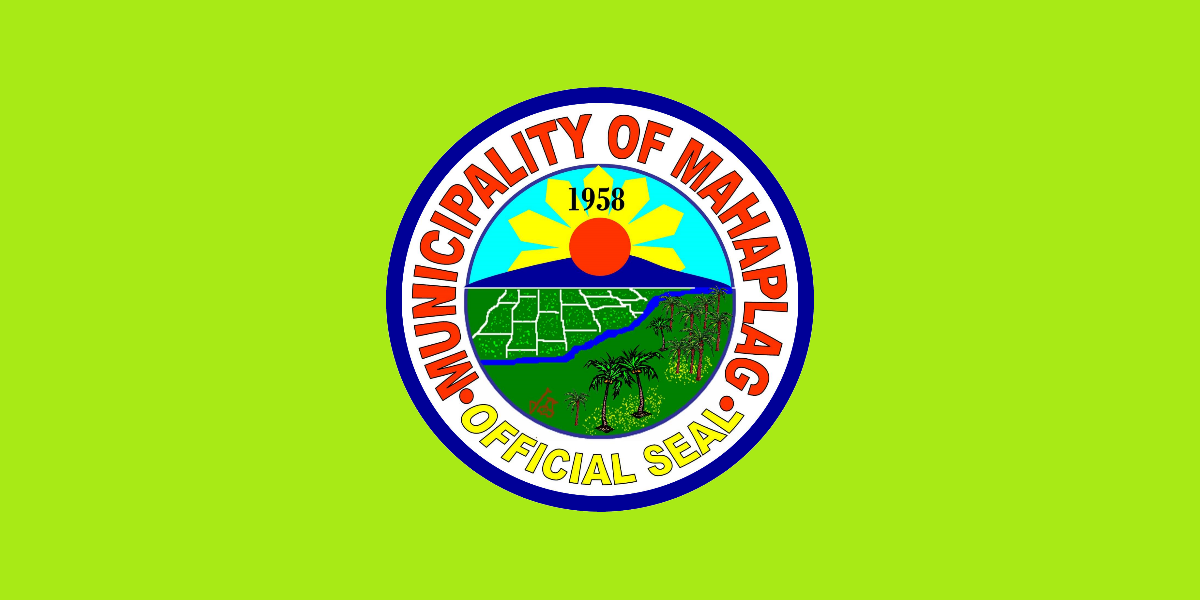
- Flag

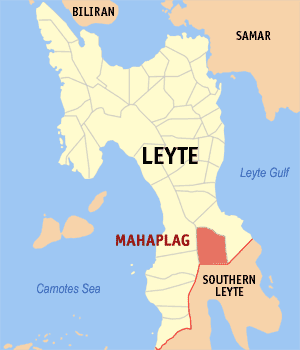
- Map of Leyte with Mahaplag highlighted
- Interactive map of Mahaplag
- Location within the Philippines
- Coordinates: 10°36′18″N 124°57′54″E
- Country: Philippines
- Region: Eastern Visayas
- Province: Leyte
- District: 5th district
- Barangays: 28 (see Barangays)

Government
  - Type: Sangguniang Bayan
  - Mayor: Daisy A. Lleve
  - Vice Mayor: Myra P. Solis
  - Representative: Carl Nicolas C. Cari
  - Councilors: List: • Arlene O. Giganto; • Aida L. Dizon; • Harlin O. Gonzaga; • Jeffrey M. Relevo; • Laudiano B. Terol; • Carmelito C. Alonzo; • Glenn H. Bartolini; • Love Joy V. Roa; DILG Masterlist of Officials
  - Electorate: 19,737 voters (2025)

Area
  - Total: 104.79 km^{2} (40.46 sq mi)
- Elevation: 238 m (781 ft)
- Highest elevation: 964 m (3,163 ft)
- Lowest elevation: 6 m (20 ft)

Population (2024 census)
  - Total: 28,424
  - Density: 271.25/km^{2} (702.53/sq mi)
  - Households: 6,713

Economy
  - Income class: 3rd municipal income class
  - Poverty incidence: 32.55% (2023)
  - Revenue: ₱ 148.7 million (2024)
  - Assets: ₱ 353.2 million (2024)
  - Expenditure: ₱ 171.9 million (2024)
  - Liabilities: ₱ 146.6 million (2024)

Service provider
  - Electricity: Don Orestes Romualdez Electric Coperative (DORELCO)
- Time zone: UTC+8 (PST)
- ZIP code: 6512
- PSGC: 0803731000
- IDD : area code: +63 (0)53
- Native languages: Waray; Tagalog

Mahaplag (IPA: [mɐ'hɐplɐg]), officially the Municipality of Mahaplag; (Waray: Bungto han Mahaplag ; Cebuano: Dakbayan sa Mahaplag ; Tagalog: Bayan ng Mahaplag), is a municipality in the province of Leyte, Philippines. According to the 2024 census, it has a population of 28,424 people.

== Geography ==
=== Barangays ===
Mahaplag is politically subdivided into 28 barangays. Each barangay consists of puroks and some have sitios.

- Campin
- Cuatro De Agosto
- Hilusig
- Himamara
- Hinaguimitan
- Liberacion
- Mabuhay
- Mabunga
- Magsuganao
- Mahayag
- Mahayahay
- Malinao
- Malipoon
- Palanogan
- Paril
- Pinamonoan
- Poblacion
- Polahongon
- San Isidro
- San Juan
- Santa Cruz
- Tagaytay
- Uguis
- Union
- Upper Mahaplag
- Hiluctogan
- Maligaya
- Santo Niño

=== Climate ===
Climate data for Mahaplag, Leyte
Month	Jan	Feb	Mar	Apr	May	Jun	Jul	Aug	Sep	Oct	Nov	Dec	Year
Mean daily maximum °C (°F)	28 (82)	28 (82)	29 (84)	30 (86)	30 (86)	29 (84)	29 (84)	29 (84)	29 (84)	29 (84)	29 (84)	29 (84)	29 (84)
Mean daily minimum °C (°F)	22 (72)	22 (72)	22 (72)	23 (73)	24 (75)	25 (77)	25 (77)	25 (77)	25 (77)	24 (75)	24 (75)	23 (73)	24 (75)
Average precipitation mm (inches)	78 (3.1)	57 (2.2)	84 (3.3)	79 (3.1)	118 (4.6)	181 (7.1)	178 (7.0)	169 (6.7)	172 (6.8)	180 (7.1)	174 (6.9)	128 (5.0)	1,598 (62.9)
Average rainy days	16.7	13.8	17.3	18.5	23.2	26.5	27.1	26.0	26.4	27.5	24.6	21.0	268.6
Source: Meteoblue

== Demographics ==
Population census of Mahaplag

Year	Pop.	±% p.a.
1960	10,010	—
1970	15,918	+4.74%
1975	17,909	+2.39%
1980	20,381	+2.62%
1990	22,673	+1.07%
1995	24,009	+1.08%

Year	Pop.	±% p.a.
2000	26,511	+2.15%
2007	27,097	+0.30%
2010	26,599	−0.67%
2015	27,823	+0.86%
2020	27,865	+0.03%
2024	28,424	+0.48%

Source: Philippine Statistics Authority

In the 2024 census, the population of Mahaplag was 28,424 people, with a density of 270 inhabitants per square kilometre or 700 inhabitants per square mile.

== Economy ==
Poverty incidence of Mahaplag (%)

Source: Philippine Statistics Authority
