= N10 highway =

Primary road in the Philippines

Route 10

Route information
- Auxiliary route of AH 26 (26)
- Maintained by the Department of Public Works and Highways
- Length: 278 km (173 mi)
- Component highways: AH 26 (N10)

Major junctions
- North end: N9 (Butuan–Cagayan de Oro–Iligan Road) in Cagayan de Oro
- N912 (Kapalong–Talaingod–Valencia Road) in Valencia; N945 (Maramag–Maradugao Road) in Maramag; AH 26 (N10) (Bukidnon–Davao Road) in Maramag; N943 (Sayre Highway) in Maramag; N942 (Paco–Roxas–Arakan Valley–Jct Davao–Bukidnon) in Davao
- South end: AH 26 (N1) (Pan–Philippine Highway) in Davao City

Location
- Country: Philippines
- Provinces: Misamis Oriental, Bukidnon, Davao del Sur
- Major cities: Cagayan de Oro, Malaybalay, Valencia, Davao City
- Towns: Manolo Fortich, Sumilao, Impasugong, Maramag, Quezon, Kitaotao

Highway system
- Roads in the Philippines; Highways; Expressways; List
← N9	→ N11

National Route 10 (N10) is a 278-kilometer (173 mi) primary national route that forms part of the Philippine highway network and a spur of Asian Highway 26 (AH26) of the Asian Highway Network. It connects the provinces of Misamis Oriental, Bukidnon and Davao del Sur.

== History ==
Two roads were designated as N10 during the addition of the national routes in 2014 by the Department of Public Works and Highways, namely Sayre Highway (Cagayan de Oro to Maramag) and Bukidnon–Davao Road (Maramag to Davao).

== Asian Highway Network ==
The entire route forms part of the Mindanao spur of the Asian Highway 26 of the Asian Highway Network. As it is part of the said network, the route markers are different as the shield is significantly smaller and is inside a blue quadilateral with a thick white outline.

== Route description ==
=== Cagayan de Oro to Maramag ===
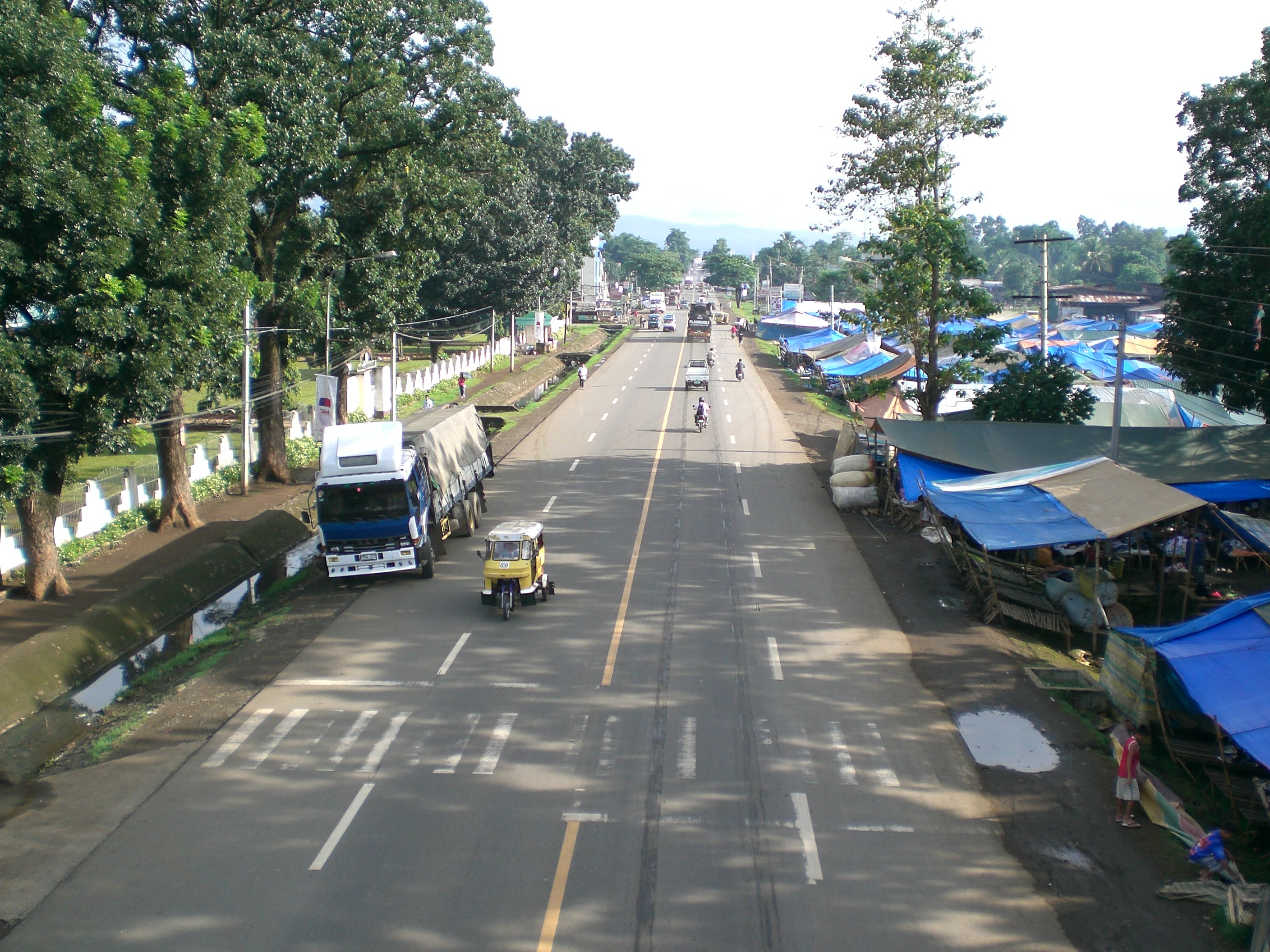
Sayre Highway in Valencia, Bukidnon

N10 starts from a junction and northern terminus in Butuan–Cagayan de Oro–Iligan Road (N9) and starts as Sayre Highway in Cagayan de Oro. It treverses to the cities and municipalities of Manolo Fortich, Impasugong, Malaybalay, Valencia and Maramag. The road after reaching the junction of Bukidnon–Davao Road, changes the route to N943 and continues at the former route.

=== Maramag to Davao ===
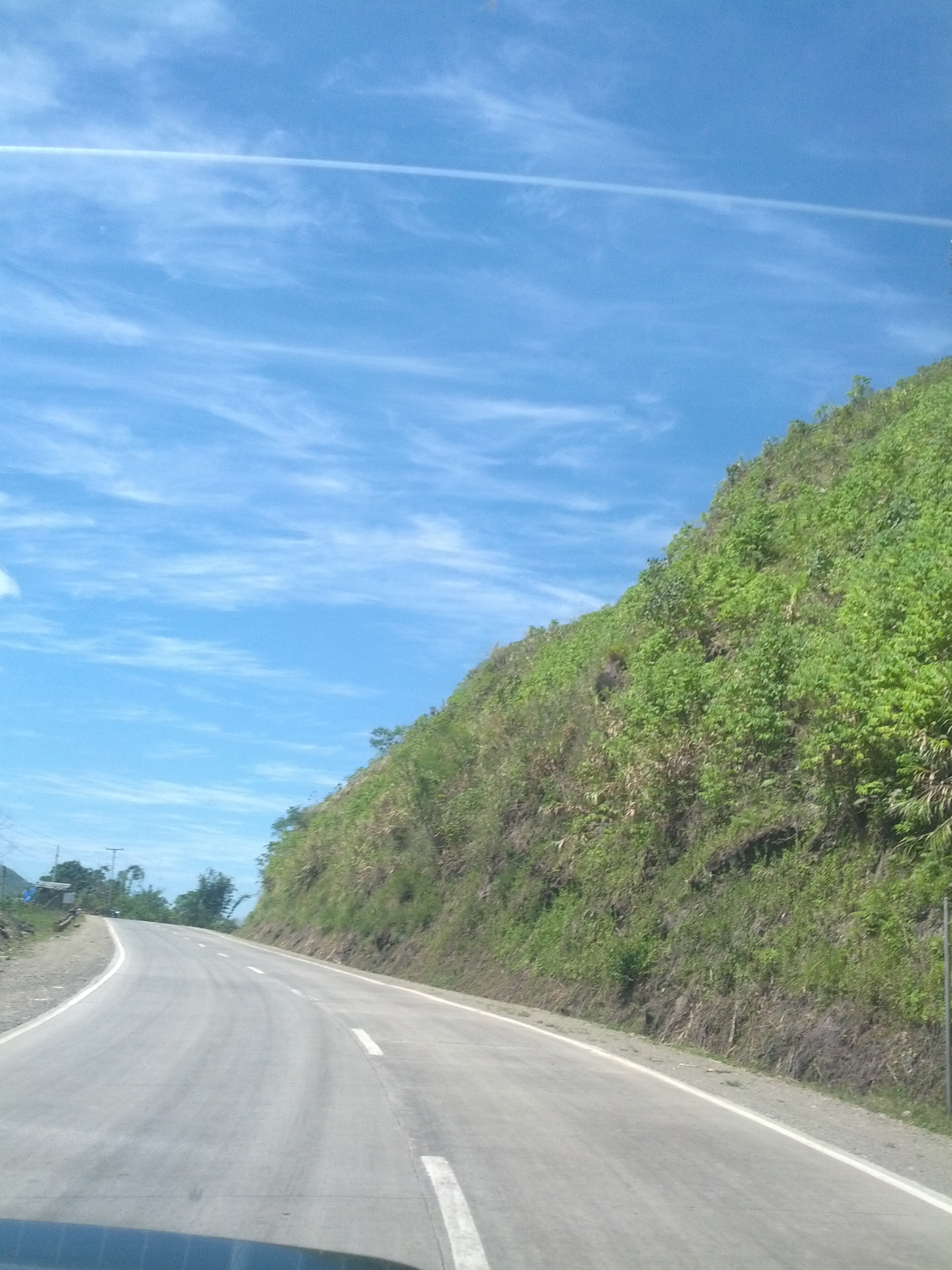
Bukidnon–Davao Road

N10 continues in Bukidnon–Davao Road, starting from Maramag. It then traverses to the municipalities of Quezon and Kitaotao, before reaching the city of Davao. It reaches its southern terminus at Maharlika Highway/Davao–Cotabato Road (N1/AH26) in Talomo, Davao City.

== Intersections ==
Province	City/Municipality	km	mi	Destinations	Notes
Cagayan de Oro		1,425	885	N9 (Butuan–Cagayan de Oro–Iligan Road)	Northern terminus
Alae River				New Alae Bridge and Old Alae Bridge over Alae River	
Bukidnon	Manolo Fortich			Jct SH–San Miguel–Del Monte Airport	
Bukidnon	Manolo Fortich			Jct SH–Manolo Fortich–Libona–Indahag Road	
Bukidnon	Malaybalay			N912-1 (Malaybalay City Bypass Road)	
Bukidnon	Malaybalay			N912-1 (Malaybalay City Bypass Road)	
Bukidnon	Valencia			N912-1 (Valencia City Bypass Road)	
Bukidnon	Valencia	1,536	954	N912 (Kapalong–Talaingod–Valencia Road)	
Bukidnon	Maramag			N912-1 (Valencia City Bypass Road)	
Bukidnon	Maramag	1,557	967	N945 (Maramag–Maradugao Road)	
Bukidnon	Maramag	1,562	971	AH 26 (N10) (Bukidnon–Davao Road)	Route change from N10 to N943
Bukidnon	Maramag	1,562	971	N943 (Sayre Highway)	N10 continues as Bukidnon−Davao Road
Davao City		1,639	1,018	N942 (Paco–Roxas–Arakan Valley–Jct Davao–Bukidnon)	
Davao City				N916-4 (Magtuod-Calinan Circumferential Road)	
Davao City				N916-3 (San Francisco Street) / Doña Aurora Street	
Davao City		1,519	944	AH 26 (N1) (Pan–Philippine Highway)	Southern terminus
1.000 mi = 1.609 km; 1.000 km = 0.621 mi
