= Davao City Coastal Road =

Road in the Philippines

- Davao City Coastal Bypass Road

Route information
- Auxiliary route of N916
- Maintained by the Department of Public Works and Highways
- Length: 17.8 km (11.1 mi)
- Status: Partial Completion
- Component highways: N916-1

Major junctions
- South end: AH26 (MacArthur Highway) in Davao City
- N916-1 (Tulip Road) in Davao City
- North end: N916 (R. Castillo Street) in Davao City

Location
- Country: Philippines
- Major cities: Davao City

Highway system
- Roads in the Philippines; Highways; Expressways; List

The Davao City Coastal Road, also referred to as Davao City Coastal Bypass Road, is a four-lane coastal bypass highway in Davao City, Philippines. Spanning approximately 17.8 kilometres (11.1 mi), it serves as an alternative coastal highway, designed to reduce traffic congestion while also functioning as a storm-surge barrier and public promenade.

== Future plans ==
Future expansions include direct connections to the proposed Davao City Expressway and Davao–Bukidnon Road via the Ulas Viaduct.

== See also ==
- Davao City Expressway
- N916 highway
- Pan-Philippine Highway
