= Kabacan massacre =

- Date: August 29, 2020
- Time: 12:20pm (UTC+8)
- Venue: Aringay Road, University of Southern Mindanao
- Location: Kabacan, Cotabato, Philippines; 7°7′15.3″N 124°49′37″E
- Also known as: Kabacan 9 massacre
- Type: Massacre
- Motive: Unknown
- Deaths: 9 (inc. 1 death in hospital)

The Kabacan massacre refers to the killing of nine unarmed Moro men by at least five unidentified individuals in the town of Kabacan in Cotabato, Philippines on August 29, 2020.

== Background ==
On August 29, 2020, at around 12:20pm (UTC+8), nine Moro farmers were shot near a granary along Aringay Road within University of Southern Mindanao (USM) campus in Kabacan, Cotabato by at least five unidentified individuals. All but one died on the sport with the sole survivor dying in a hospital a few hours later. The nine men reportedly were told to alight from their motorcycles by the suspects who proceeded to shoot at the victims using high powered firearms.

== Perpetrators and motive ==
The perpetrators of the Kabacan massacre are undetermined although what is known is at least five individuals were involved in the killings. The Kabacan Police released a report which concluded that the assailants were equipped with high powered firearms such as M-16 Armalite rifle, Carbine rifle and caliber .45 pistol based from 32 empty shells retrieved from the crime scene. Initially the incident was reported as a rido or clan feud by authorities but it was established that there was no gunfight and that the victims were gunned down by the suspects.

The Region 12 office of the Commission on Human Rights (CHR) says that the local police might be responsible for the killing citing a "dying declaration" it retrieved from the relatives of the ninth victim who died in a hospital alleging that police officers were responsible for the incident.

== Response ==
The Philippine National Police said that the law enforcement agency will be conducting an investigation on the matter. A special task force was formed led by Cotabato Police Provincial Office head Henry Villar heading to a marching order by Cotabato Governor Nancy Catamco to identify and arrest the suspects of the killings. The Philippine Army in Cotabato province also launched its own investigation reasoning that the incident might escalate tensions and hamper its "peace and development efforts".

CHR Region 12 launched its own probe on the incident and has considered the incident as a case of "extrajudicial killing" and is considering filing charges against the local police. The human rights body said that even if the local police was found not liable for the killings itself, it may consider indicting them for negligence if they find the police's response to the case as inefficient.

Bangsamoro Chief Minister Murad Ebrahim also directed Public Order and Safety Minister Hussein Muñoz to form and lead a body tasked to investigate the massacre. He also called on the Bangsamoro Human Rights Commission to conduct its own investigation.

The formed PNP task force is aiming to dispel reports that the police is responsible for the killings as "fake news".

== Reactions ==
Several sectors of the local community including the Moro National Liberation Front, the Roman Catholic Diocese of Kidapawan, and the CBCP National Secretariat on Social Action has urged an independent probe on the killings.

The Bangsamoro regional government condemned the killings despite the massacre happening outside its jurisdiction since that the victims were identified as Moros.
