= Pakiputan Wharf Road =

Road in the Philippines

Pakiputan Wharf Road
- Sasa Wharf Road
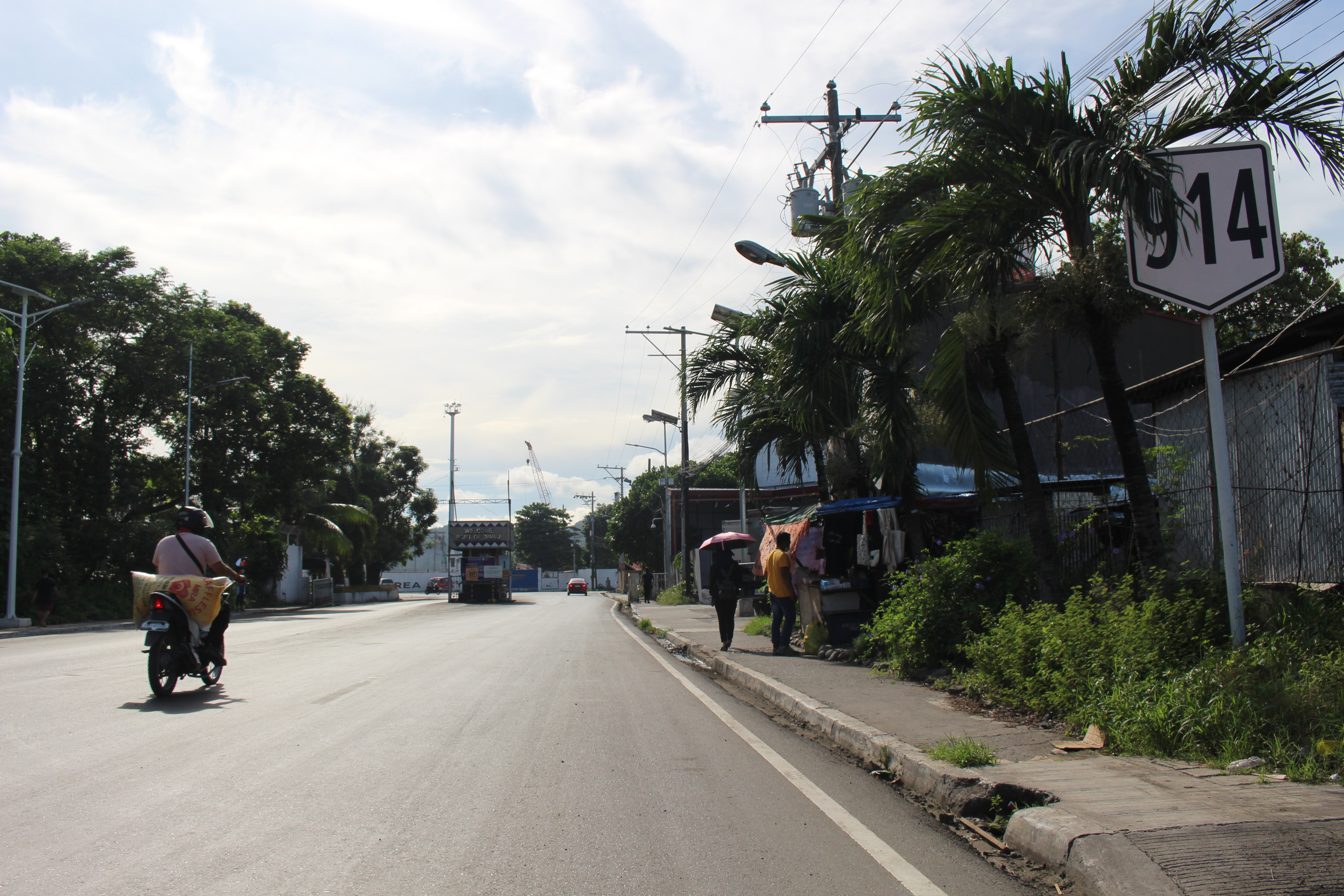
- Sasa Wharf Access Road

Route information
- Maintained by Department of Public Works and Highways
- Length: 0.5 km (0.31 mi; 1,600 ft)
- Component highways: N914

Major junctions
- West end: AH 26 (N1) (Davao–Agusan National Highway)
- East end: Port of Davao

Location
- Country: Philippines
- Major cities: Davao City

Highway system
- Roads in the Philippines; Highways; Expressways; List
← N913	→ N915

The Pakiputan Wharf Road is a 0.5 kilometers (0.31 mi), two-lane road that connects the Pan-Philippine Highway to the Port of Davao. It serves as Davao's main road for port access.

The highway forms part of National Route 914 (N914) of the Philippine highway network
