= Catitipan Airport Road =

Road in the Philippines

Catitipan Airport Road
- Old Davao Airport Road
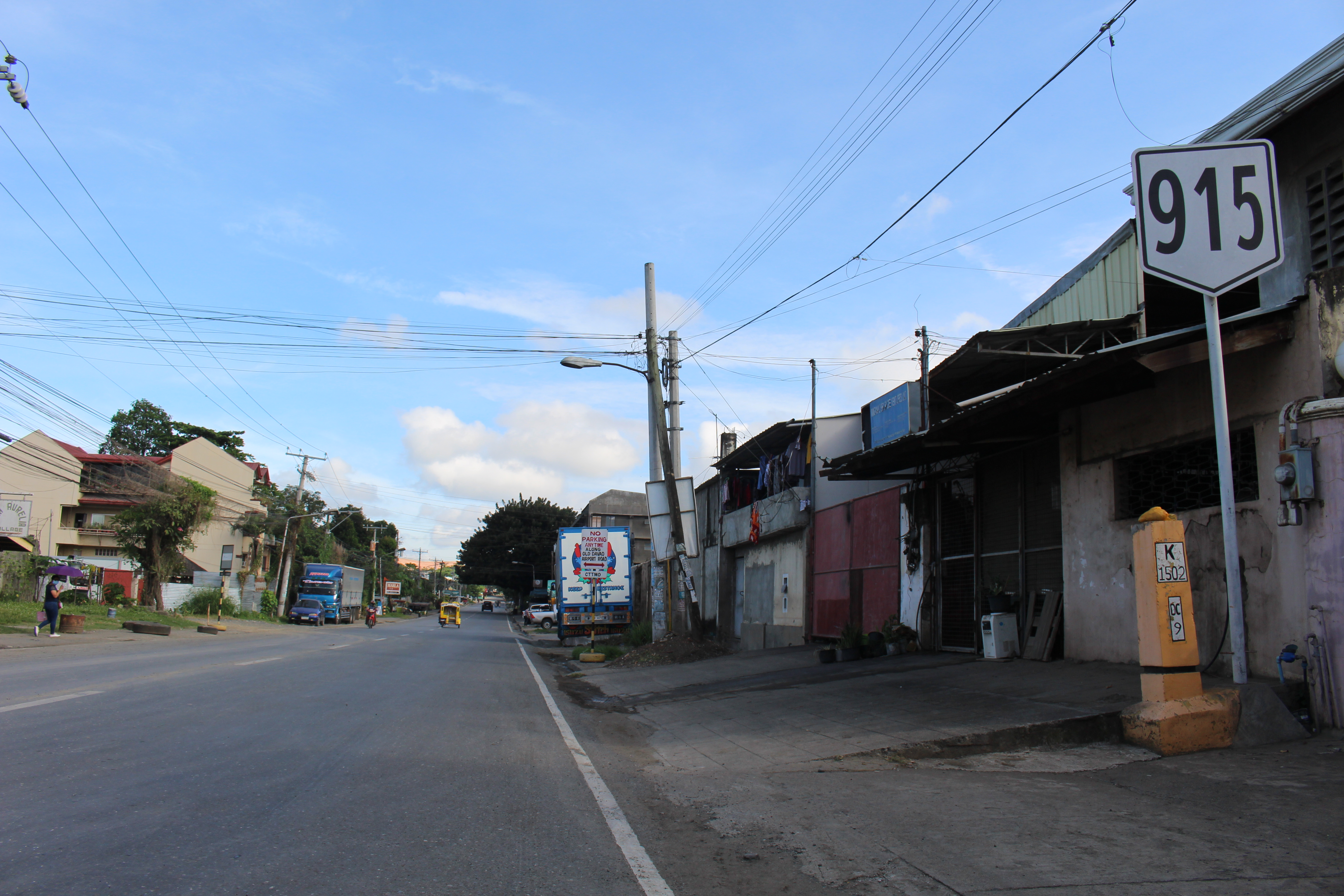
- Old Airport Road

Route information
- Maintained by Department of Public Works and Highways
- Length: 2 km (1.2 mi)
- Component highways: N915

Major junctions
- North end: Mindanao Development Authority (Old Davao Airport)
- South end: AH 26 (N1) (Davao-Agusan National Highway) in Davao

Location
- Country: Philippines
- Major cities: Davao

Highway system
- Roads in the Philippines; Highways; Expressways; List
← N914	→ N916

The Catitipan Airport Road is a 2-kilometer (1.2 mi), two-lane road that formerly served as an access road to the Old Davao Airport in Davao. The current Airport Road is accessed through the Carlos P. Garcia National Highway.

The highway forms part of National Route 915 (N915) of the Philippine highway network.

== History ==
In 1955, it was declared a national secondary road due to Executive Order No. 113 by President Ramon Magsaysay. It formerly served as the airport road of the Old Davao Airport.
