= Davao City Expressway =

Proposed city expressway in Davao City, Philippines

- Davao Expressway
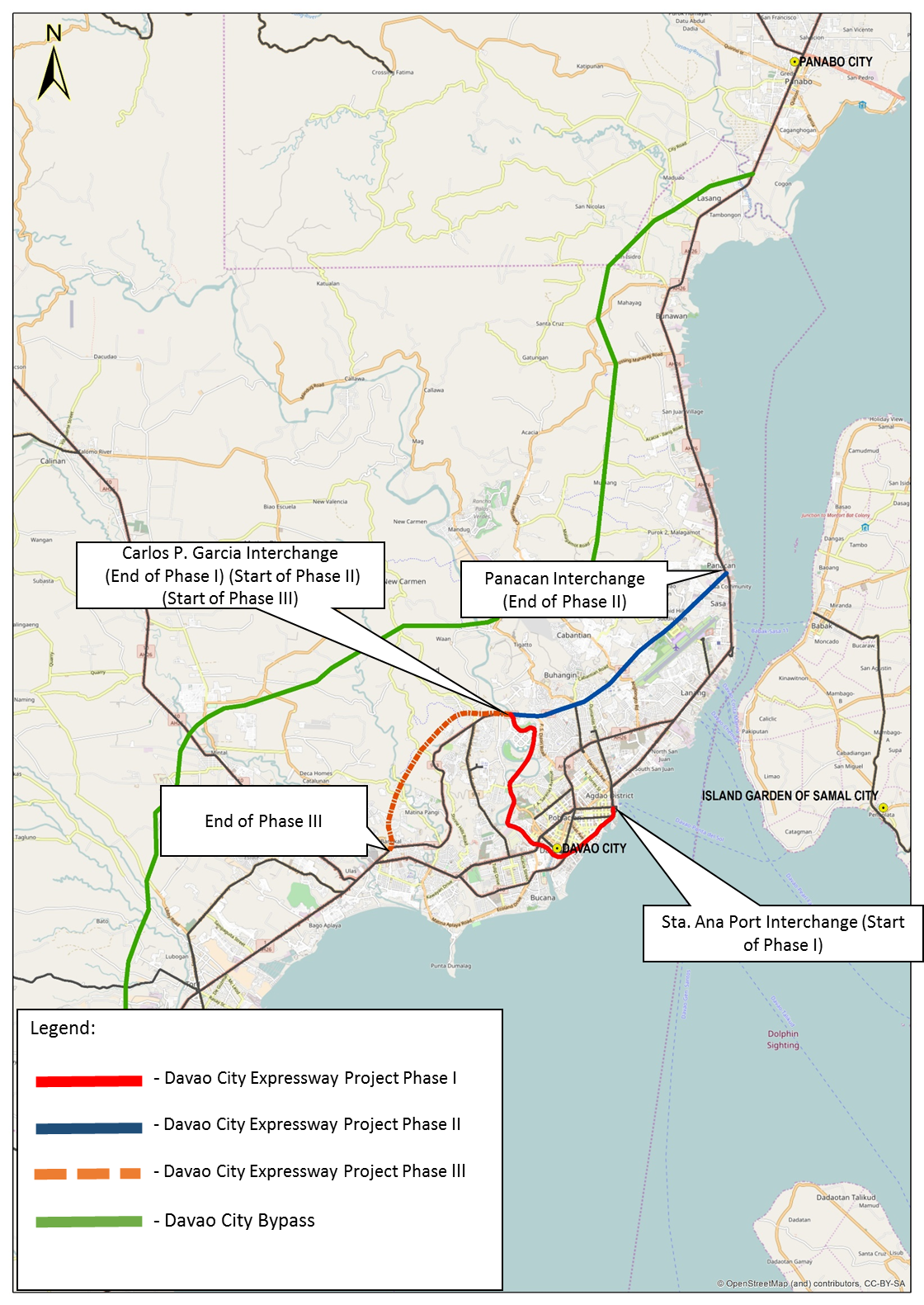
- Official route

Route information
- Length: 23.3 km (14.5 mi)

Major junctions
- From: Santa Ana Port and Agdao District; Panacan
- To: Bangkal, Davao City

Location
- Country: Philippines
- Major cities: Davao City

Highway system
- Roads in the Philippines; Highways; Expressways; List

The Davao City Expressway is a proposed expressway in Davao City, Philippines. It was proposed by the then-President of the Philippines, Rodrigo Duterte, to mitigate the congestion on the section of the Pan-Philippine Highway in Davao City.

== Project description ==
The Davao City Expressway is one of the flagship infrastructure projects proposed under the Build! Build! Build! Program of the Duterte administration. The proposed project is a two-way, four-lane urban 29.21-kilometer expressway which aims to link Davao City's main areas with the Port of Davao and Francisco Bangoy International Airport. It is divided into three phases, with a T-shaped interchange in Ma-a that would connect south to the Davao Coastal Road, east to Panacan, and west to Toril. Phase 1 of the project will consist of an 8.479 km elevated viaduct structure covering Davao Coastal Road via the Sta. Ana Port Interchange to the Carlos P. Garcia Interchange in Ma-a. Phase 2 consists of an 8.510 km elevated viaduct structure from Ma-a Interchange to Panacan. Phase 3 will be a 12.821 km at-grade structure, including a 0.27 km expressway tunnel, from Ma-a Interchange to Dumoy Interchange.

The proposal also details that the expressway will be a 23.1 meter-wide, four-lane main road with 34 viaducts, a 260-meter-long (850 ft) tunnel, and nine interchanges (three T-Hub, one partial cloverleaf and five diamond interchanges). Viaducts at various lengths make up 90% of the project, while the rest will be built at-grade. The project's total cost is estimated to be P80.528 billion, including a road right of way (ROW) cost estimate of P4.12 billion. The project will be under an ODA (Official Development Assistance) mode of financing.

Once completed, the Davao City Expressway is expected to greatly improve the traffic capacity of the Davao section of Asian Highway 26 (AH26). The project is expected to boost economic and social development in Davao City and potentially drive rapid economic development to the rest of Mindanao.

== Phases of development and cost ==
Phases
Segment	Location	Length
Phase 1	Davao City Coastal Road to Ma-a Interchange	Total length of 6.774 km, including bridge(viaduct) length of about 5.626 km
Phase 2	Panacan Interchange to Ma-a Interchange	Total length of 9.615 km, including bridge(viaduct) length of about 9.045 km
Phase 3	Ma-a Interchange to Dumoy Interchange	Total length of 12.821 km, including bridge(viaduct) length of about 7.35 km and 260 m tunnel

The proposed project has an approximate cost of P80.528 billion, including road right-of-way (ROW) costs.

== Project status ==
- Authority to Procure was approved on January 20th, 2017.
- Preparation of the Terms of Reference (TOR), Approved Budget for the Contract (ABC) and other bidding documents.
- Feasibility Study EIS Report (May 2022).
- With ECC (November 9th, 2022).
- Approved Infrastructure Flagship Project (IFP) from NEDA (March 2023).
- Government to spend P1.2 trillion for infrastructure in Mindanao, which includes the Davao City Expressway.

== See also ==
- North Luzon East Expressway
- Expressways of the Philippines
- Mindanao
