= Banisilan–Guiling–Alamada–Libungan Road =

Road in Mindanao, Philippines

Banisilan–Guiling–Alamada–Libungan Road

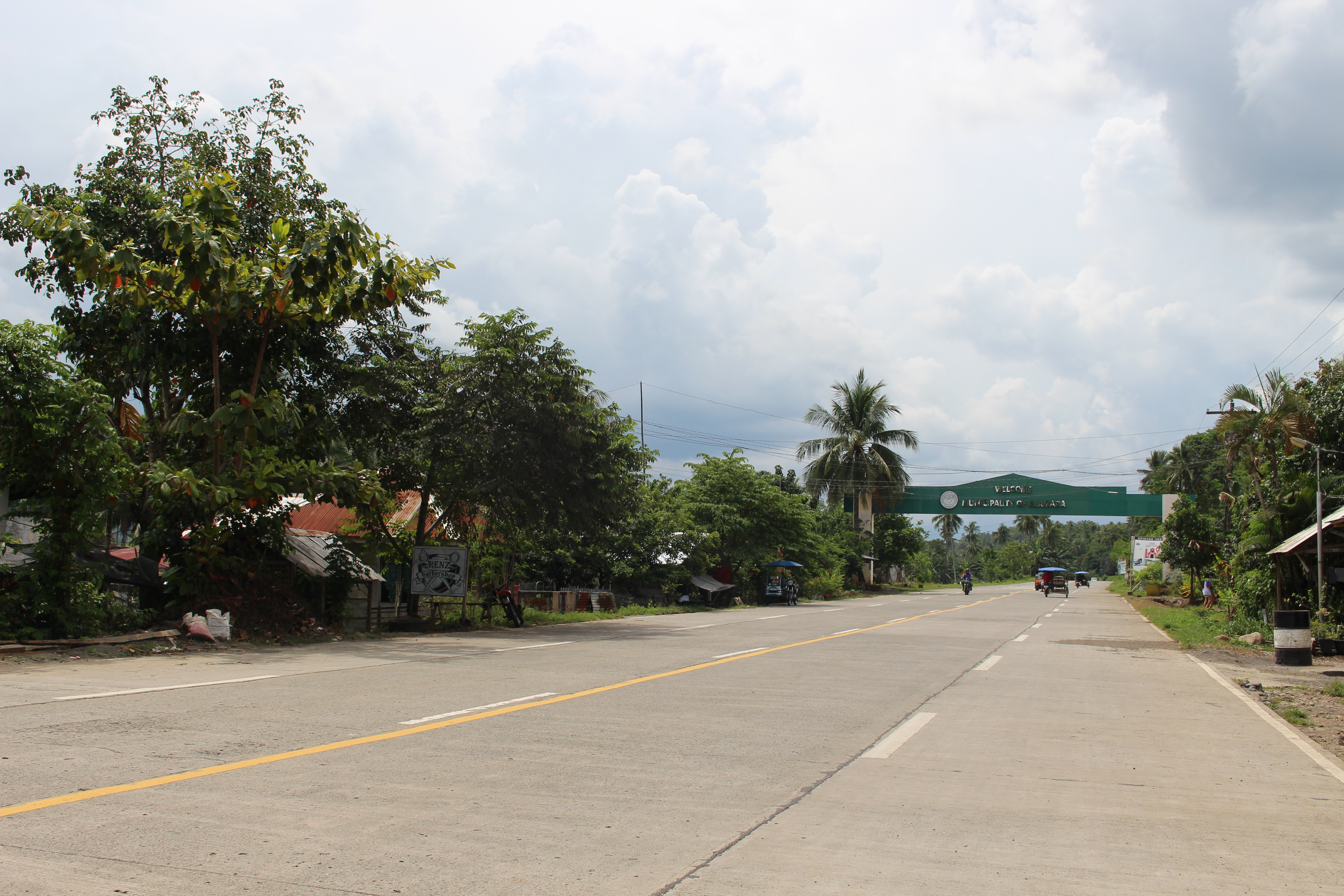

Route information
- Maintained by Department of Public Works and Highways
- Length: 118 km (73 mi)
- Component highways: N944

Major junctions
- From: N75 (Davao–Cotabato Road) at Libungan
- To: N945 (Cagayan de Oro–Dominorog–Camp Kibaritan Road) in Kalilangan

Location
- Country: Philippines
- Towns: Libungan, Alamada, Banisilan, Wao, Kalilangan

Highway system
- Roads in the Philippines; Highways; Expressways; List
← N943	→ N945

The Banisilan–Guiling–Alamada–Libungan Road is a 118-kilometer (73 mi), two-lane secondary highway that connects the provinces of Cotabato, Lanao del Sur, and Bukidnon. The road also connects Libungan, Cotabato to the Davao–Cotabato Road and leads to Asik-Asik Falls in Alamada, Cotabato.

The highway forms part of National Route 944 (N944) of the Philippine highway network.
