= Davao–Cotabato Road =

Road in the Philippines

Davao–Cotabato Road

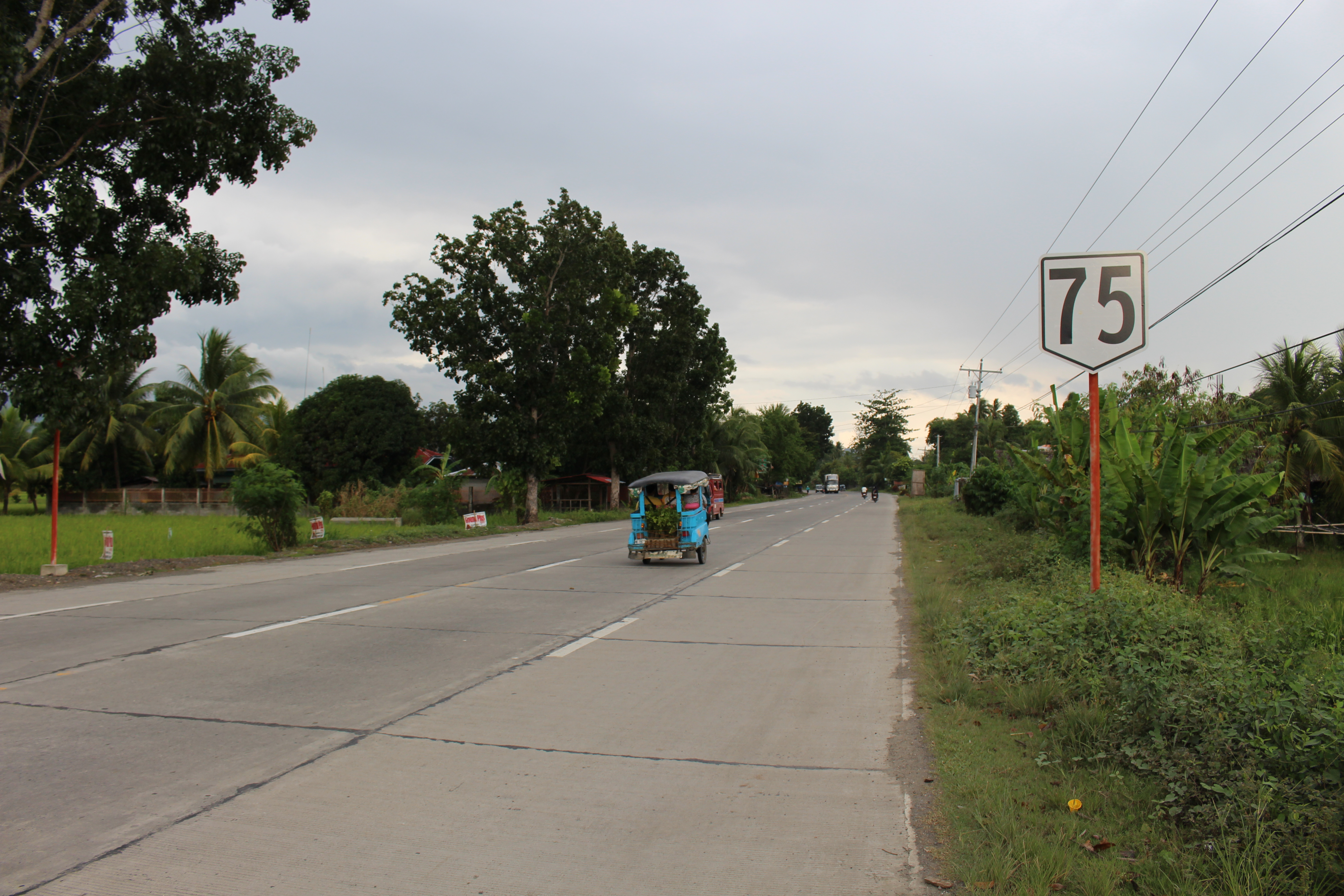
- Reassurance Marker at Pigcawayan, North Cotabato. However, it has been taken away as of 2021.

Route information
- Maintained by Department of Public Works and Highways
- Length: 205.664 km (127.794 mi)
- Component highways: AH 26 (N916-5) in Davao City; AH 26 (N1) from Davao City to Digos and Sultan Kudarat; N75 from Digos to Sultan Kudarat

Major junctions
- East end: Bonifacio Rotunda in Davao City
- N920 (Quirino Highway) in Davao City; N921 (Ma-a Road) in Davao City; N916 (Quimpo Boulevard) in Davao City; N1 (Carlos P. Garcia National Highway) in Davao City; AH 26 (N10) (Davao–Bukidnon Road) in Talomo, Davao City; N923 (Digos Diversion Road) in Digos; AH 26 (N1) (Digos–Makar Road) in Digos; N76 (Makilala–Allah Valley Road) at Makilala; N942 (Paco–Roxas–Arakan Valley–Junction Davao–Bukidnon Road) at Kidapawan; N943 (Sayre Highway) at Kabacan: N940 (Makar–Dulawan–Midsayap–Marbel Road) at Midsayap; N944 (Banisilan–Guiling–Alamada–Libungan Road) at Libungan
- West end: AH 26 (N1) (Cotabato–Lanao Road) in Sultan Kudarat, Maguindanao del Norte

Location
- Country: Philippines
- Provinces: Davao del Sur, Cotabato, Maguindanao del Norte, Maguindanao del Sur
- Major cities: Davao City, Digos, Kidapawan
- Towns: Bansalan, Makilala, Matalam, Kabacan, Datu Montawal, Pagalungan, Pikit, Aleosan, Midsayap, Libungan, Pigcawayan, Santa Cruz

Highway system
- Roads in the Philippines; Highways; Expressways; List
| ← N74 | → N76 |

The Davao–Cotabato Road is a 205.7-kilometer (127.8 mi), two-to-six lane major national primary road, connecting the provinces of Davao del Sur, Maguindanao del Sur, Cotabato, and Maguindanao del Norte. It runs from Davao City to Sultan Kudarat, Maguindanao del Norte.

This road is designated as part of National Route 916-5 (N916-5), National Route 1 (N1) and National Route 75 (N75) of the Philippine highway network and partially Asian Highway 26 (AH26) of the Asian highway network.

== Route description ==
=== Davao City to Digos ===
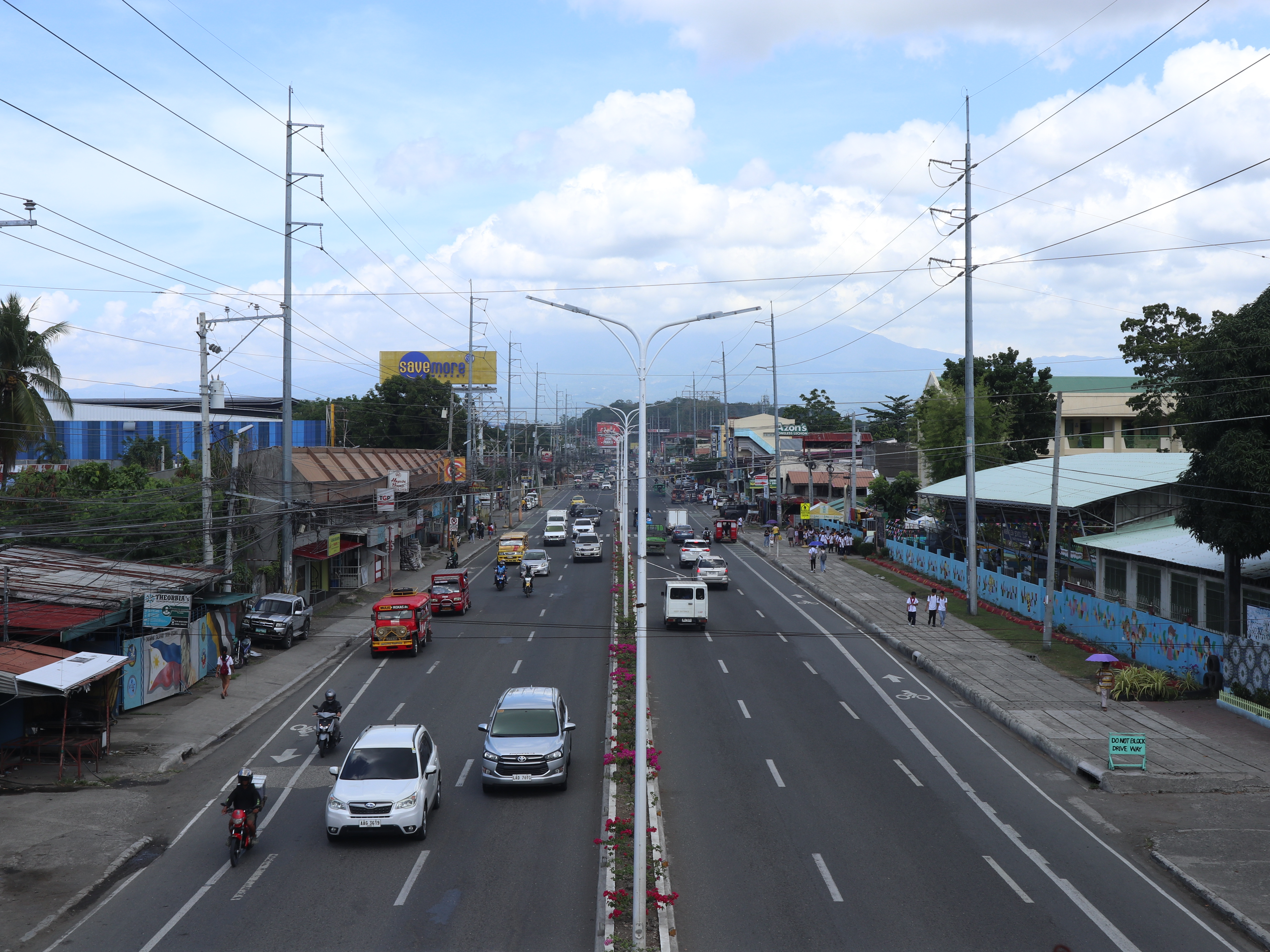
Davao–Cotabato Road as McArthur Highway in Davao City. This section forms part of N916-5.

Starting at the Bonifacio Rotunda in the Davao City proper, the Davao–Cotabato Road begins as the western section of National Route 916-5 (N916-5) and a component of the Pan-Philippine Highway (AH26). It initially runs northwest as A. Pichon Street, a one-way street carrying southeast-bound traffic. The route then turns southwest onto Elpidio Quirino Avenue and becomes MacArthur Highway upon crossing the General Generoso Bridge I over the Davao River.

It then meets Carlos P. Garcia National Highway, where it turns west and becomes part of National Route 1 (N1). It then enters Santa Cruz, Davao del Sur as it traverses its eastern coast. It enters Digos and there it meets Digos–Makar Road, locally known as Rizal Avenue, where N1/AH26 would continue.

=== Digos to Makilala ===
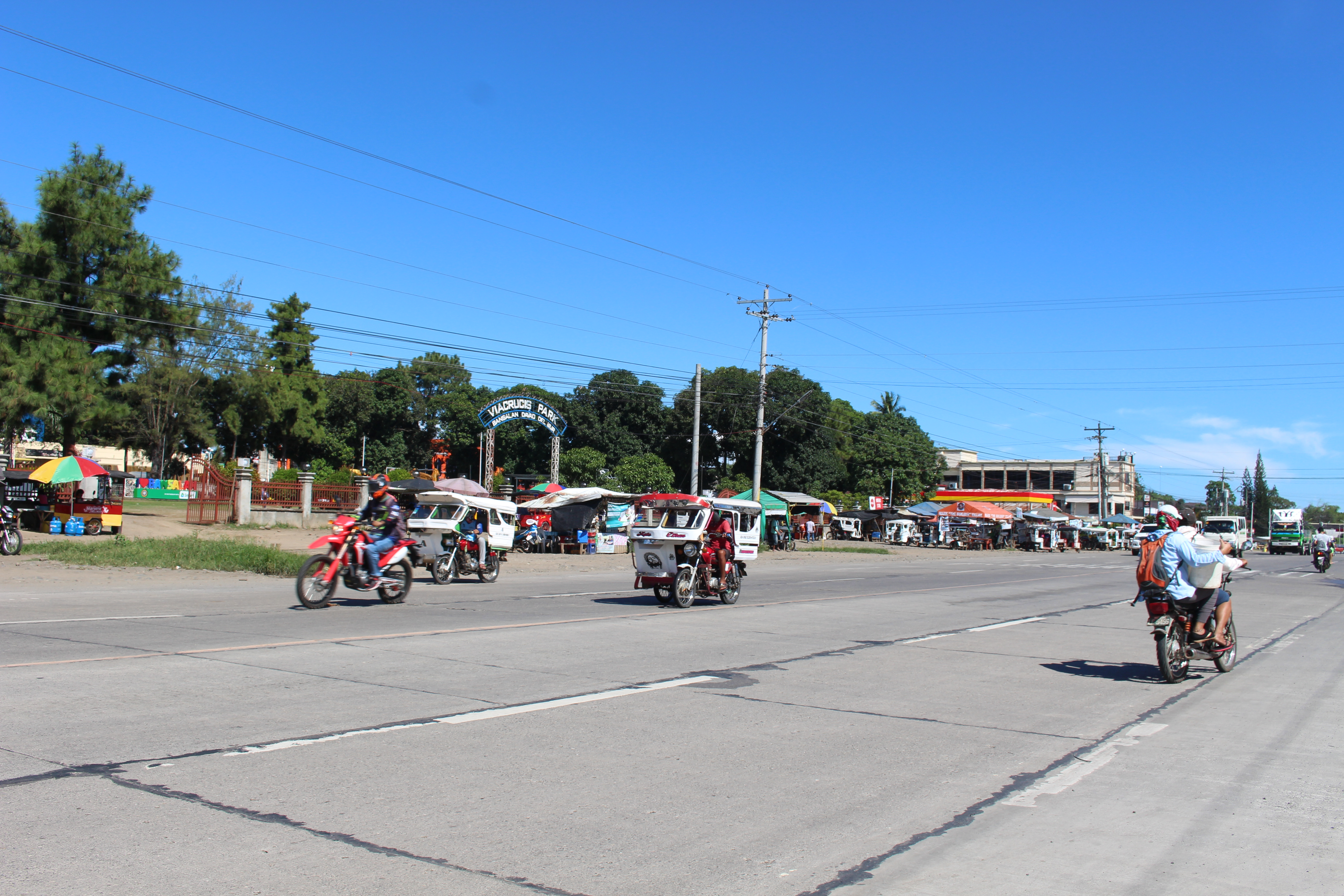
The road in Bansalan.

N75 commences at the intersection with N1/AH26. It traverses to the west through the municipality of Bansalan onto towards Makilala for 32 kilometers (20 mi). There is a gateway sign when entering Makilala.

=== Makilala to Matalam ===
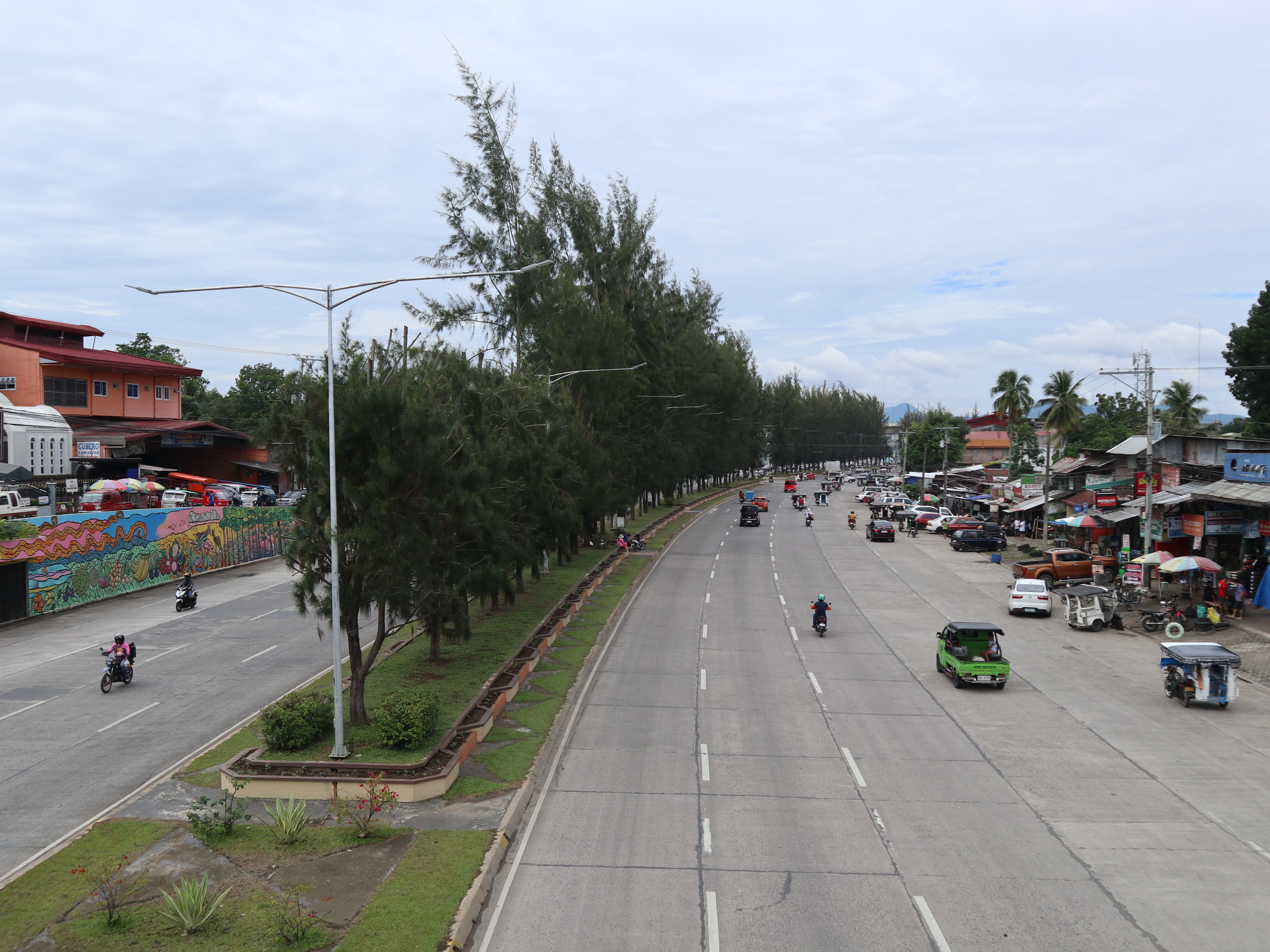
The road as Quezon Boulevard in Kidapawan.

At Makilala, it connects towards Makilala–Allah Valley Road (N76) which links Makilala to Sultan Kudarat Province. It traverses Kidapawan, where it is locally known as Quezon Boulevard, and connects to Paco–Roxas–Arakan Valley–Junction Davao–Bukidnon Road (N942). The route then traverses into Matalam for 47 kilometers (29 mi). There is a roundabout that connects Davao–Cotabato Road to a national tertiary highway that leads to M'lang and a shortcut for Makilala–Allah Valley Road (N76).

=== Matalam to Kabacan ===
Davao–Cotabato Road traverses towards Kabacan and has a crossing that links up with Sayre Highway (N943). It connects North Cotabato to Bukidnon. The total length of this section is at 11 kilometers (6.8 mi).

=== Kabacan to Midsayap ===
At Kabacan, the Davao–Cotabato Road traverses towards Maguindanao del Sur into Datu Montawal and Pagalungan. It then enters Cotabato, traversing Pikit and Aleosan onto towards Midsayap for 42 kilometers (26 mi). At Midsayap, it links to N940 that traverses towards Marbel.

=== Midsayap to Sultan Kudarat, Maguindanao del Norte ===
N75 traverses towards into Libungan and links up with Banisilan–Guiling–Alamada–Libungan Road (N944). It finally traverses towards Pigcawayan and Sultan Kudarat into its western section. The western section of Davao–Cotabato Road (N75) links back into the Pan-Philippine Highway in 33 kilometers (21 mi).

== History ==
The highway existed back to the American colonial era as part of Highway 1 in Mindanao that linked Surigao and Davao via Cagayan. The entire highway was once considered part of the Pan-Philippine Highway, until the route was realigned from the section west of Digos (via Koronadal) to the southern roads passing through General Santos. The route markers were added in 2014 (for N1/AH26) and 2017 (for N75), although the look of the N75 route marker is different in Davao del Sur due to the stretched 5.

In the mid-2020s, the section of the road between the Bonifacio Rotunda and Carlos P. Garcia National Highway was redesignated as N916-5, as N1 was redesignated to the latter. Despite this reclassification to a secondary national road, the segment retains its status as part of the Pan-Philippine Highway or Asian Highway 26 (AH26) network.

== Intersections ==
Intersections are numbered by kilometer post, with the Rizal Park in Manila designated as kilometer 0.

| Province | City/Municipality | km | mi | Destinations | Notes |
|---|---|---|---|---|---|
| Davao City | | | | N916-5 (C.M. Recto Avenue) / A. Pichon Street | Roundabout; eastern terminus |
| Davao City | | 1,511.8 | 939.4 | N920 (Quirino Highway) | |
| Davao City | | | | N921 (Ma-a Road) | |
| Davao City | | 1,515.01 | 941.38 | N916 (Quimpo Boulevard) | |
| Davao City | | | | N1 (Carlos P. Garcia National Highway) | Route number transition from N916-5 to N1 |
| Davao City | | 1,519.00 | 943.86 | AH 26 (N10) (Davao–Bukidnon Road) | |
| Davao del Sur | Digos | | | N923 (Digos Diversion Road) | |
| Davao del Sur | Digos | 1,563.522 | 971.528 | AH 26 (N1) (Digos–Makar Road / Rizal Avenue) | Route number transition from N1 to N75; end of AH26 concurrency |
| Davao del Sur | Digos | 1,565.4 | 972.7 | N924 (Digos Junction Road) | Locally known as Quezon Avenue |
| Cotabato | Makilala | 1,593.193 | 989.964 | N76 (Makilala–Allah Valley Road) | |
| Cotabato | Kidapawan | 1,625.310 | 1,009.921 | N942 (Paco–Roxas–Arakan Valley–Junction Davao–Bukidnon Road) | Roundabout. |
| Cotabato | Kabacan | | | N943 (Sayre Highway) | |
| Cotabato | Midsayap | 1,693.098 | 1,052.042 | N940 (Makar–Dulawan–Midsayap–Marbel Road) | |
| Cotabato | Libungan | | | N944 (Banisilan–Guiling–Alamada–Libungan Road) | |
| Maguindanao del Norte | Sultan Kudarat | 1,715.788 | 1,066.141 | AH 26 (N1) (Cotabato-Lanao Road) | Western terminus. |
1.000 mi = 1.609 km; 1.000 km = 0.621 mi: Route transition
