= Sayre Highway =

Major road in Mindanao, Philippines

Sayre Highway

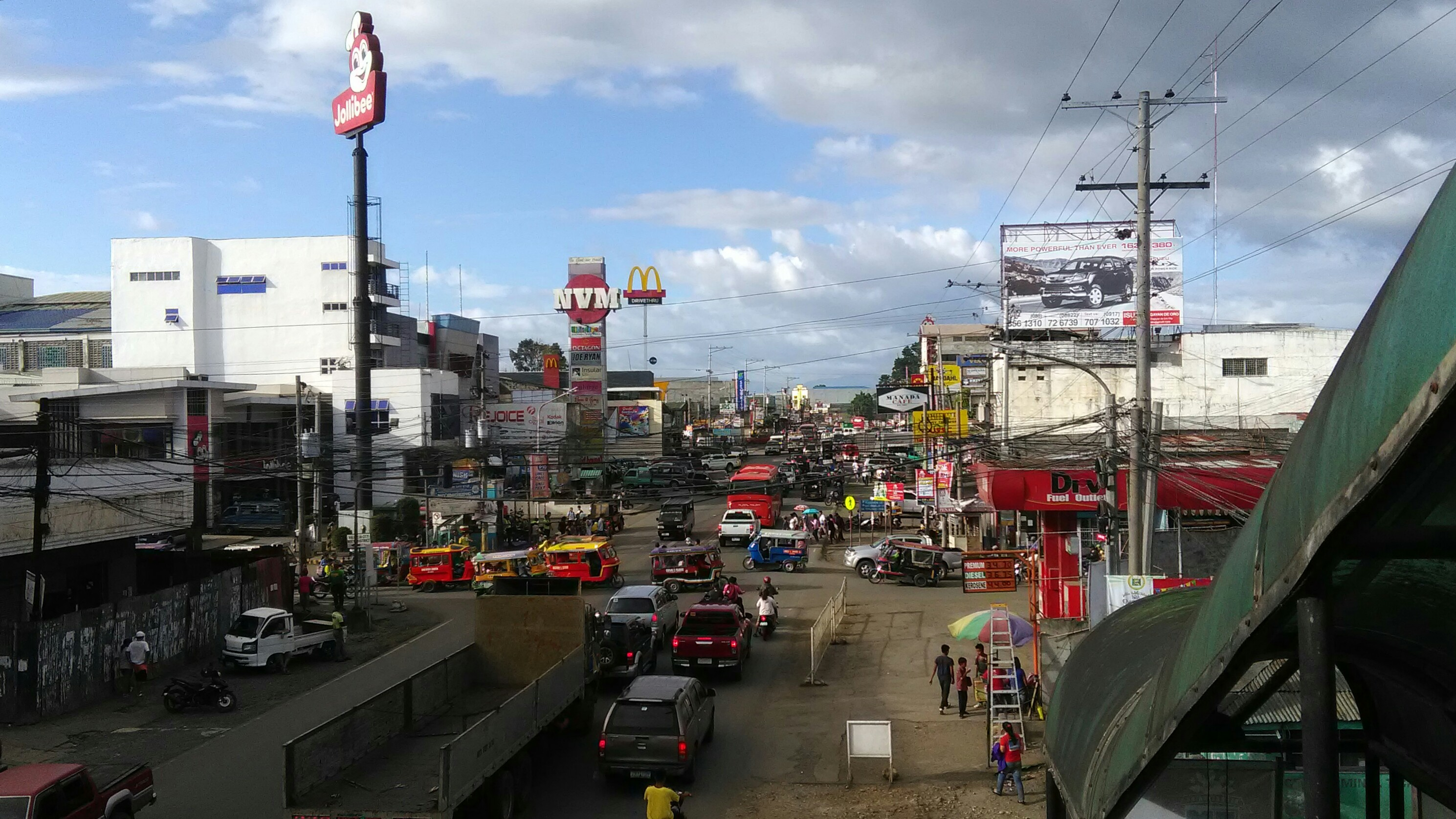
- Portion of the Sayre Highway in Valencia, Bukidnon

Route information
- Auxiliary route of AH 26 (26)
- Length: 192 km (119 mi)
- Component highways: AH 26 (N10) (Cagayan de Oro to Maramag); N943 (Maramag to Kabacan)

Major junctions
- North end: N9 (Butuan–Cagayan de Oro–Iligan–Tukuran Road) – Puerto, Cagayan de Oro, Misamis Oriental
- AH 26 (N10) (Dologon–Quezon Road) in Maramag, Bukidnon; N945 (Maramag–Maradugao Road) in Maramag, Bukidnon; AH 26 (N10) (Bukidnon–Davao Road) in Maramag, Bukidnon; N912 (Kapalong–Talaingod–Valencia Road) in Valencia, Bukidnon
- South end: N75 (Davao–Cotabato Road) – Kabacan, Cotabato

Location
- Country: Philippines
- Provinces: Misamis Oriental, Bukidnon, Cotabato
- Major cities: Cagayan de Oro, Malaybalay, Valencia
- Towns: Manolo Fortich, Sumilao, Maramag, Don Carlos, Kitaotao, Dangcagan, Kibawe, Damulog, Carmen, Kabacan

Highway system
- Roads in the Philippines; Highways; Expressways; List
| ← N9 | → N11 |

The Francis Bowes Sayre Sr. Highway or simply the Sayre Highway is a four-to-six lane, 192-kilometre (119 mi), primary national highway that connects Cagayan de Oro to Kabacan. It traverses the provinces of Misamis Oriental, Bukidnon and Cotabato.

The highway's name was Route 3 but was changed to Sayre Highway, in honor of Francis Bowes Sayre, Sr., the U.S. Philippine High Commissioner who spearheaded its construction. It extends southward through central Mindanao for a distance of about 161 kilometers (100 mi), linking the northern and southern arms of Route 1 (Digos–Butuan Highway). This section of the Philippine national highway was constructed during the American occupation of the Philippines.

The parts of the highway are composed of National Route 10 (N10), a spur route of Asian Highway 26 in the north; and National Route 943 (N943) in the southern portion of the Philippine highway network.

== Intersections ==
Intersections are numbered by kilometre post, with the Rizal Park in Manila designated as kilometre 0.

| Province | City/Municipality | km | mi | Destinations | Notes |
|---|---|---|---|---|---|
| Misamis Oriental | Cagayan de Oro | | | N9 (Butuan–Cagayan de Oro–Iligan Road) | Northern terminus |
| Bukidnon | Valencia | | | N912 (Kapalong–Talaingod–Valencia Road) | |
| Bukidnon | Maramag | | | N945 (Maramag–Maradugao Road) | |
| Bukidnon | Maramag | | | AH 26 (N10) (Bukidnon–Davao Road) | Route number changes from N10 to N943. |
| Cotabato | Kabacan | | | N75 (Davao–Cotabato Road) | Southern terminus |
1.000 mi = 1.609 km; 1.000 km = 0.621 mi: Route transition
