= Bukidnon–Cotabato Road =

Road in the Philippines

Bukidnon–Cotabato Road

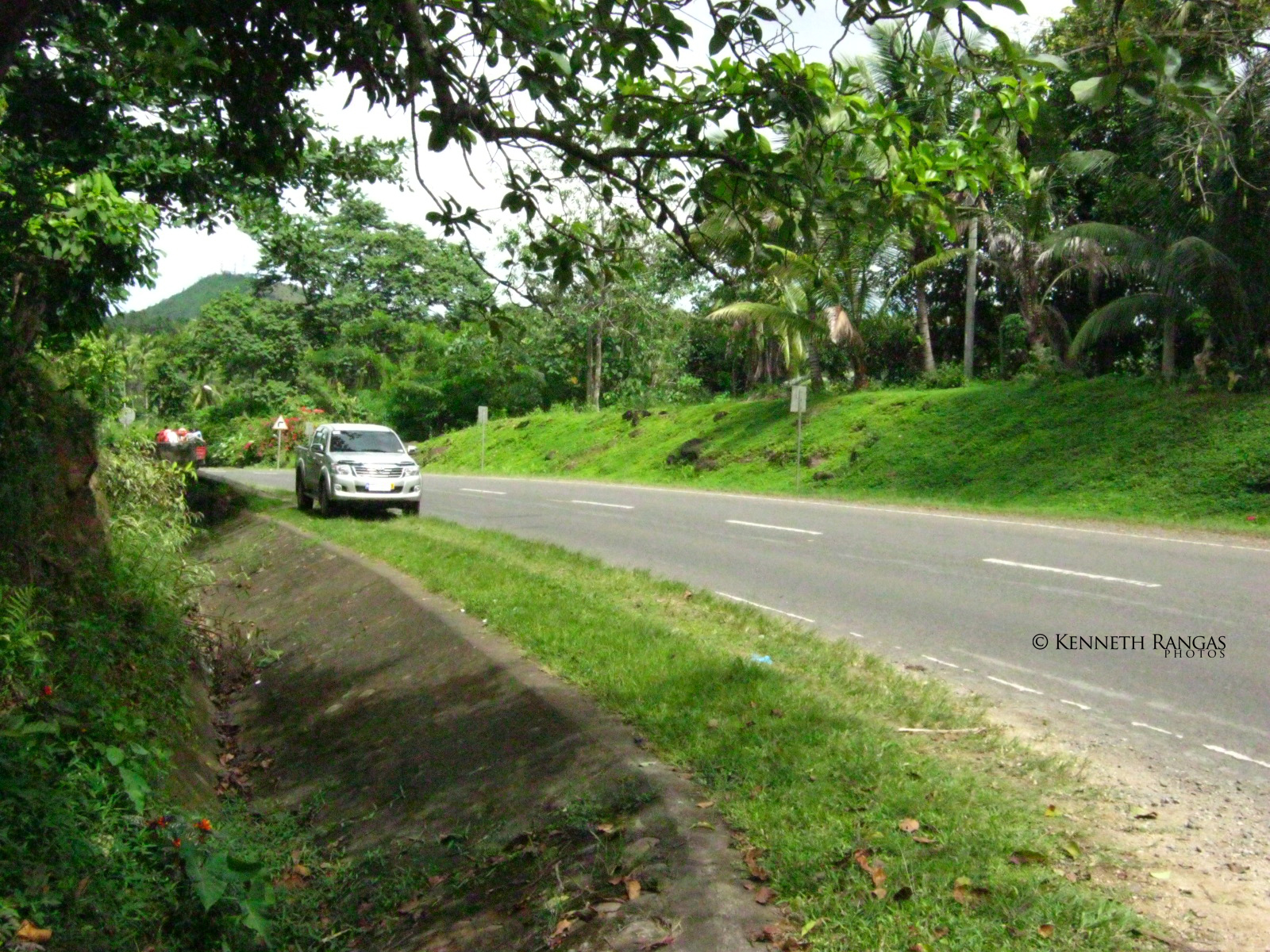
- Section of the Road in Damulog, Bukidnon

Route information
- Maintained by Department of Public Works and Highways
- Length: 94 km (58 mi)
- Component highways: N943

Major junctions
- North end: AH 26 (N10) in Maramag, Bukidnon
- South end: N75 (Davao–Cotabato Road) at Kabacan, Cotabato

Location
- Country: Philippines
- Towns: Kabacan, Carmen, Kadingilan, Damulog, Kibawe, Dangcagan, Maramag, Don Carlos

Highway system
- Roads in the Philippines; Highways; Expressways; List
| ← N942 | → N944 |

The Bukidnon–Cotabato Road is a 94-kilometre (58 mi) two-to-four lane highway that connects the provinces of Cotabato and Bukidnon. This highway serves as one of the components of Sayre Highway.

This highway is a designated component of National Route 943 (N943) of the Philippine highway network.
