= Bukidnon–Davao Road =

Road in the Philippines

Bukidnon–Davao Road
- Davao–Bukidnon Road; BuDa Road
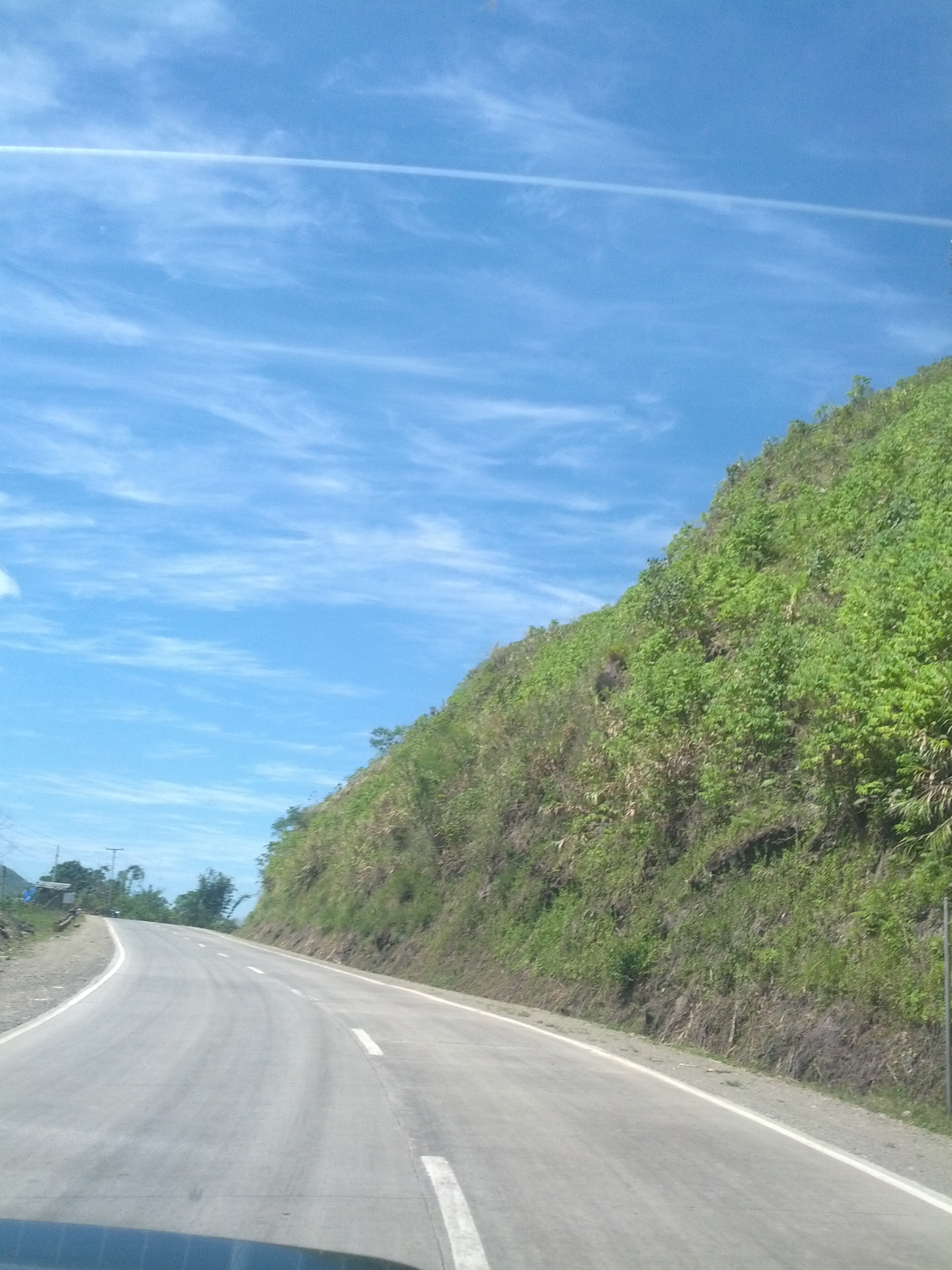
- Bukidnon–Davao Road northbound, 2013

Route information
- Auxiliary route of AH 26 (26)
- Maintained by Department of Public Works and Highways
- Length: 140 km (87 mi)

Major junctions
- From: AH 26 (N10) / N943 (Sayre Highway) in Maramag
- N942 (Arakan–Katipunan Road) in Arakan
- To: AH 26 (N1) (McArthur Highway) in Davao

Location
- Country: Philippines
- Provinces: Davao del Sur, Cotabato, Bukidnon
- Major cities: Davao City
- Towns: Arakan, Kitaotao, Quezon, Maramag

Highway system
- Roads in the Philippines; Highways; Expressways; List
← N9	→ N11

The Bukidnon–Davao Road, often called as BuDa Road (a syllabic abbreviation of Bukidnon and Davao) and also known as Bukidnon–Davao City Road or conversely as Davao–Bukidnon Road, is a 140-kilometer (87 mi), two-to-four lane national primary highway that connects Davao City and the municipality of Maramag in Bukidnon.

The entire road forms part of National Route 10 (N10) of the Philippine highway network and a spur of Asian Highway 26 (AH26) of the Asian highway network.

== History ==
Having been a local road connecting Talomo to Malagos in the then-town of Davao, the route was later extended north through the mountainous terrain to Bukidnon, forming the present-day highway.

On July 17, 2026, a section of the Bukidnon–Davao Road in Sitio Marahan, Barangay Marilog Proper, Davao City, collapsed due to a landslide. The collapse made the highway impassable, damaging 11 houses and displacing 14 families.
