= N916 highway =

Road in the Philippines

Route 916

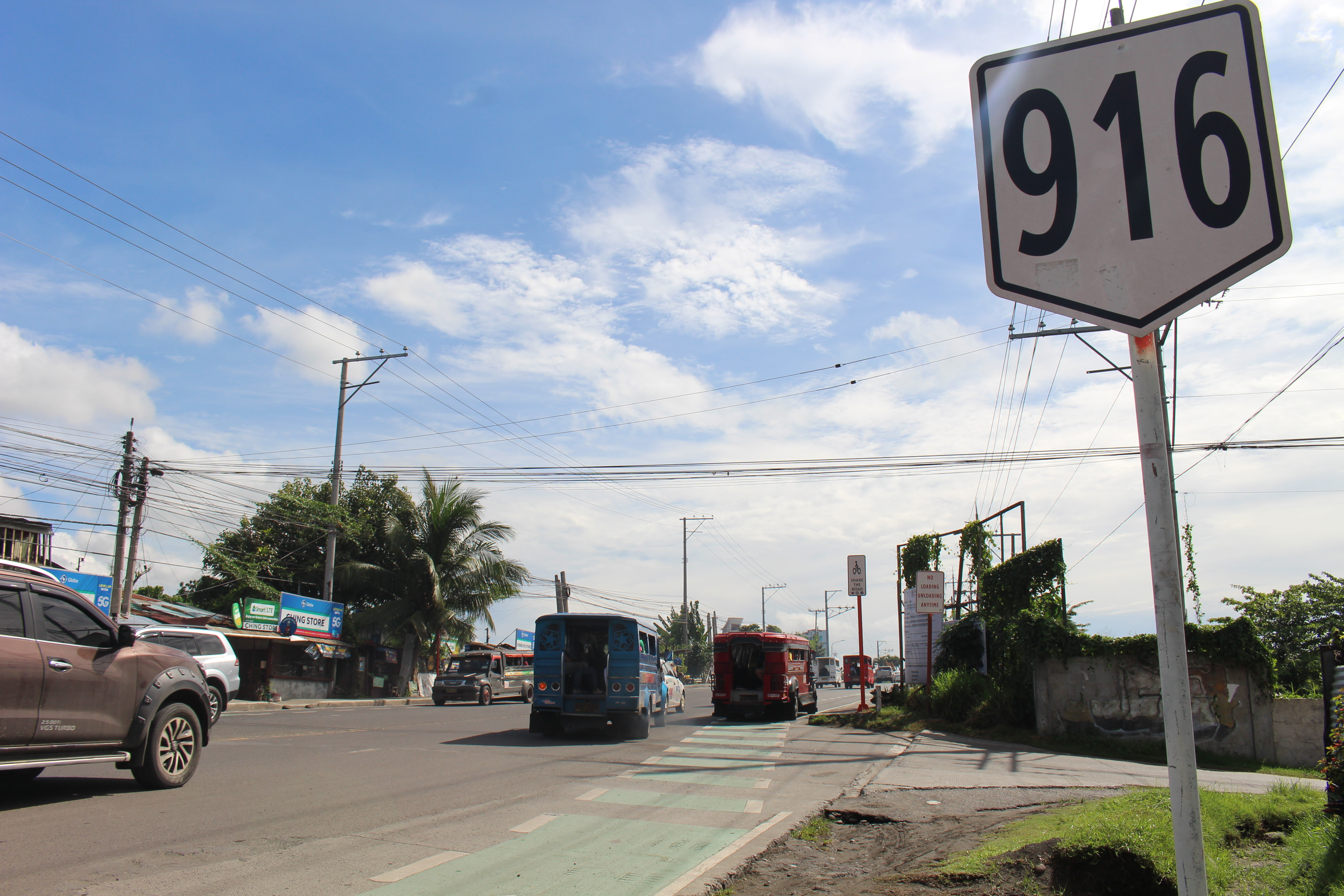
- Quezon Boulevard, near Bolton Bridge

Route information
- Maintained by Department of Public Works and Highways
- Length: 11 km (6.8 mi)

Major junctions
- West end: N916-5 (MacArthur Highway) in Talomo, Davao City
- N919 (Magsaysay Avenue) in Poblacion; N919 (Santa Ana Avenue) in Poblacion; N917 (J.P. Cabaguio Avenue) / N918 (Dacudao Road) in Agdao
- East end: N916-5 (Davao–Agusan National Highway / J.P. Laurel Avenue) in Agdao, Davao City

Location
- Country: Philippines
- Major cities: Davao City

Highway system
- Roads in the Philippines; Highways; Expressways; List
← N915	→ N917

National Route 916 or N916 is a 11-kilometer (6.8 mi), two-to-four lane road that consists of four different major streets and five spur routes in Davao City. It is one of major roads in the city that connects the western and eastern part of Davao.

== Route description ==
There are nine components of this road, Quimpo Boulevard, Quezon Boulevard, Leon Garcia Street, R. Castillo Street, Davao City Coastal Road (as N916-1), Carlos Villa-Abrille Drive and Tulip Drive (as N916-2), Mintal-Bago Galleria Road and San Francisco Street (as N916-3), Toril-Calinan Road (as N916-4), and the recently reclassified former Daang Maharlika routes (Davao-Agusan National Highway, J.P. Laurel Avenue, C.M. Recto Avenue and the MacArthur Highway as 916-5).

=== Quimpo Boulevard ===
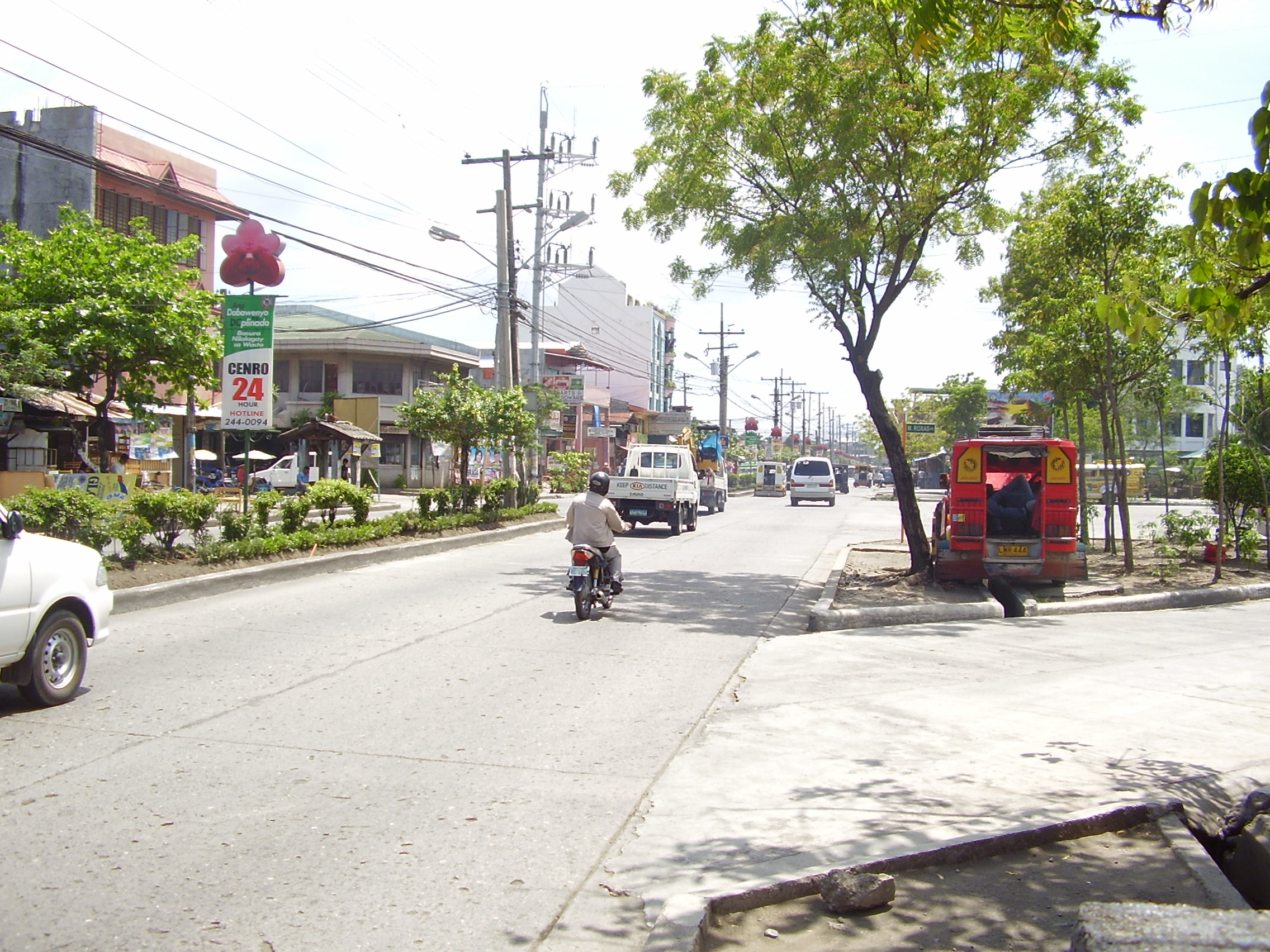
Quimpo Boulevard

Quimpo Boulevard is a 4-kilometer (2.5 mi) road in Talomo district that links AH26 to Bolton Bridge. It also has an intersection near Bolton Bridge which links to a tertiary road that also serves as a shortcut to AH26.

=== Quezon Boulevard ===
Quezon Boulevard is a 2-kilometer (1.2 mi) road that links Bolton Bridge to Magsaysay Avenue (N919), at the vicinity of Magsaysay Park in Poblacion district.

=== Leon Garcia Street ===
Leon Garcia Street is a 1-kilometer (0.62 mi) road that connects N919 to the Agdao Flyover. It also links to Santa Ana Avenue, also a part of N919, in Uyanguren.

=== R. Castillo Street ===
R. Castillo Street is a 5-kilometer (3.1 mi) that connects the eastern section of N916 to N916-5. It links Agdao to Lanang.

=== Davao City Coastal Road ===
Davao City Coastal Road is a 17.8-kilometer (11.1 mi) coastal bypass highway in Davao City that links R. Castillo Street in Agdao to MacArthur Highway in Bago Aplaya. It provides an alternative route to ease congestion in the city’s central districts while running parallel to the Davao Gulf shoreline.

== Reclassification of former N1 Routes ==
Under Department Order No. 150, series of 2025, certain segments of the former N1 route in Davao City were reclassified as part of N916-5, including sections of the Davao–Agusan National Highway, J.P. Laurel Avenue, C.M. Recto Avenue, and the MacArthur Highway. Beginning in August 2025, the N1 designation was reassigned to the Carlos P. Garcia National Highway (Davao City Diversion Road), shifting the primary north–south route away from the city’s traditional urban corridors.
