= University of Southern Mindanao =

Public university in Cotabato, Philippines

- Pamantasan ng Dakong Timog ng Mindanao (Filipino)
- Former name: Mindanao Institute of Technology (1952-78)
- Motto: Our USM
- Type: Public, State university
- Established: June 20, 1952; 74 years ago (creation); October 1, 1954; 72 years ago (opening)
- Affiliations: SCUAA and MASCUFF, PASUC, AACCUP,
- Endowment: PHP225,325,000.00
- President: Jonald L. Pimentel, Ph.D.
- Administrative staff: 1,600
- Students: 15,000-19,999 (2024)
- Undergraduates: 11,408
- Location: USM Avenue, Kabacan, Cotabato, Philippines; 7°6′54.86″N 124°50′12.1″E
- Campus: See §Instruction
- Hymn: USM Hymn
- Colors: Green and Gold
- Nickname: USM
- Website: Official website
- Location in Mindanao Location in the Philippines

The University of Southern Mindanao (USM; Filipino: Pamantasan ng Dakong Timog ng Mindanao), formerly Mindanao Institute of Technology (MIT),is a university in the Southern Philippines. It provides instruction and professional training in science and technology, particularly in agriculture and industry. The university was founded by Bai Hadja Fatima Matabay Plang, an educator and philanthropist. It formally opened on October 1, 1954, and achieved university status on March 13, 1978.

Its 1,024-hectare main campus is located in Kabacan, Cotabato. The University of Southern Mindanao is one of four State Universities and Colleges (SUCs) recognized for excellence in agricultural education and one of nine to hold Level IV status. Across its three campuses, USM manages a total of 5,129.97 hectares of land, primarily for agricultural teaching and research.

== History ==
The USM main campus was originally a rubber plantation owned and managed by a Scot named Fleming, who was granted 1,024 hectares in 1909. Ownership changed hands several times until the Japanese occupation, when it came under the control of the Ohta Development Company. After the Americans defeated the Japanese in 1944, the compound was taken over by the United States government until 1947, when it was transferred to the Philippine government. It was not until the 1950s that the Maguindanao princess, Bai Hadja Fatima Matabay Plang, initiated the movement to establish the Mindanao Institute of Technology (MIT). She was supported in this effort by Datu Udtog Matalam, then governor of the Empire Province of Cotabato, and by Congressman Salipada Pendatun, who later became House Speaker.

President Elpidio Quirino signed Republic Act (RA) 763, the law creating the Mindanao Institute of Technology, on June 20, 1952. On June 10, 1954, President Ramon Magsaysay signed RA No. 998, the enabling act for the establishment and subsequent operation of MIT, with an initial allocation of ₱200,000 for the school’s operation.

On March 13, 1978, President Ferdinand E. Marcos signed Presidential Decree (PD) No. 1312, which converted the Mindanao Institute of Technology into a university. Dr. Jaman S. Imlan became the first university president.

As a university, USM was mandated to fulfill three key roles: instruction, research, and extension. A fourth role, resource generation, was later added.

The university's primary function is teaching and instruction, which is carried out by nearly 500 faculty members.

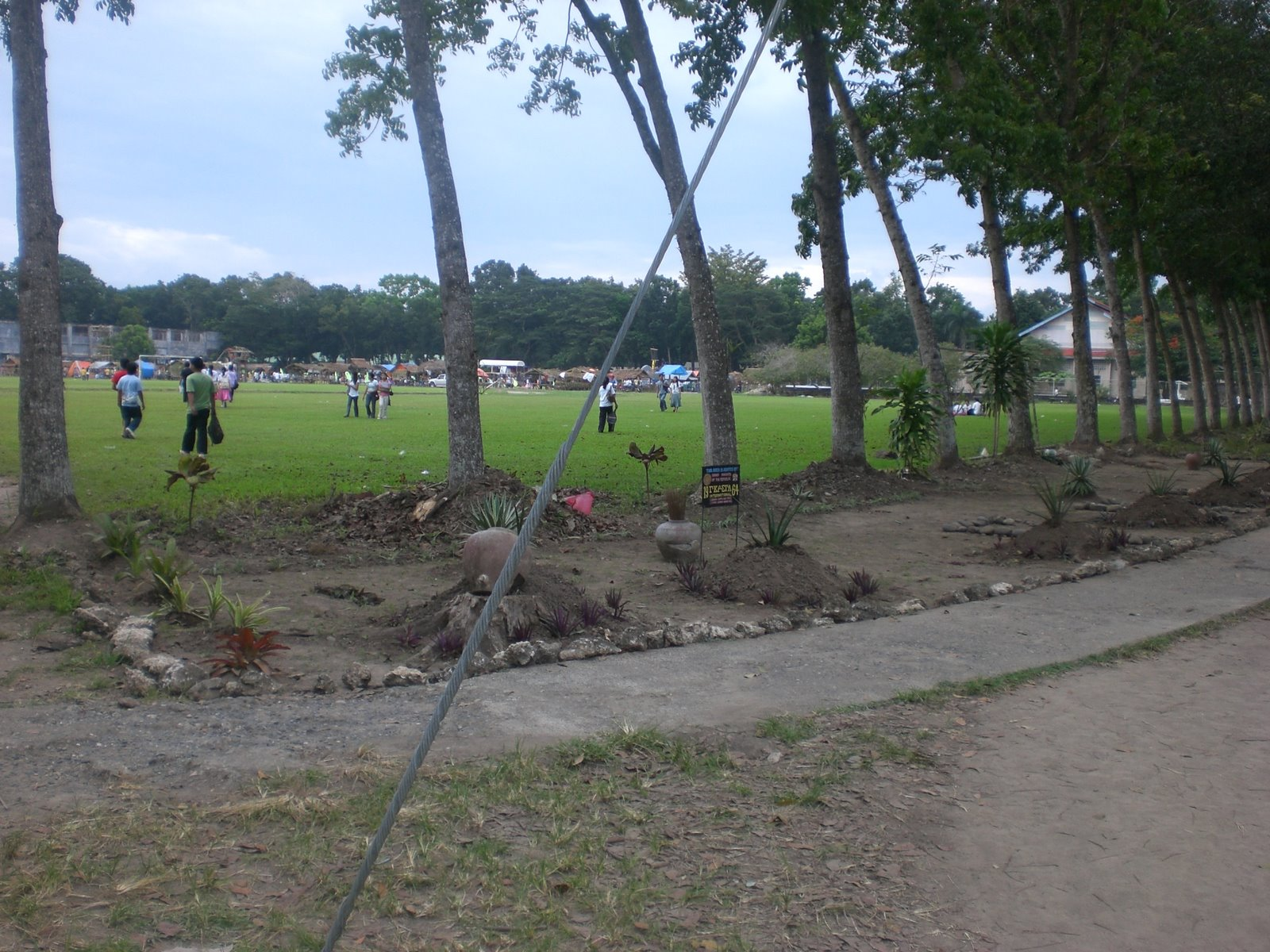
Campus Grounds

== Instruction ==
Instruction is provided for tertiary and advanced level courses. The eleven colleges, one institute, external campus and extension campuses offer a total of approximately 90 associate, degree, masters and doctoral programs and. In addition, the university maintains laboratories for its teacher training programme and special short courses.

=== Main/Kabacan Campus ===
- College of Agriculture
- College of Arts and Social Sciences
- College of Business, Development Economics and Management
- College of Education
- College of Engineering and Information Technology
- College of Human Ecology and Food Sciences
- Institute of Middle East and Asian Studies
- College of Science and Mathematics
- College of Human Kinetics (formerly Institute of Sports, Physical Education and Recreation)
- College of Trade and Industries
- College of Veterinary Medicine
- College of Health Sciences
- College of Medicine
- Graduate School
- University Laboratory School

=== USM Kidapawan City Campus ===
- College of Engineering
- College of Technology
- College of Education, Arts and Sciences
- College of Law

==== USM-PALMA Cluster ====
- USM Libungan Campus
- USM Alamada Campus
- USM Aleosan Campus

=== Other Campuses ===
- USM Buluan Campus
- USM Mlang Campus
- USM Antipas Campus
- USM Banisilan Campus
- USM Pigcawayan Campus

== Research ==
Research is a major function of the university, primarily conducted through its research arms: the University of Southern Mindanao Agricultural Research Center (USMARC) and the Philippine Industrial Crops Research Institute (PICRI).

USMARC serves as the national research center for corn, sorghum, and fruit crops; the regional center for rice and other cereals, livestock and farming systems, water resources, applied rural sociology, cut flowers, and ornamental plants; and a cooperating station for coconut and vegetable crops.

PICRI is the national research institute for rubber, fiber crops, coffee, spices, cacao, and other industrial crops. Attached to PICRI is the Philippine Rubber Testing Center (PRTC), which specializes in dried natural rubber.

USM also hosts two organized bodies dedicated to research and development: the Cotabato Agricultural and Resources Research and Development Consortium (CARRDEC), a research consortium of agencies in Central Mindanao, and the Philippine Carabao Center (PCC), a member of the national PCC network.

== Extension ==
The University's Extension Office coordinates extension work, which the colleges and research units conduct either independently or in collaboration with government agencies and private organizations. Extension services include training various clientele groups—primarily farmers—providing technical assistance to different sectors, implementing social laboratory projects, establishing demonstration farms, offering consultancy services, and promoting public education through personal engagement and mass media (radio, print, and video).

== Resource generation ==
USM's resource generation program generates substantial income to supplement the university's operating fund and serves as a laboratory for horticulture, animal science, agronomy, and agribusiness.

Research areas include rice and corn; buffalo, cattle, and sheep; swine; poultry; and various fruit crops such as durian, lanzones, mango, calamansi, and other citrus fruits, as well as coconut, banana, marang, guyabano, rambutan, and pineapple.

USM is recognized for its open-pollinated variety (OPV) corn seeds, as well as grafted and budded seedlings of fruit and plantation crops. Additionally, USM hostels accommodate self-sustaining business ventures and income-generation projects (IGPs).

=== Facilities and research centers ===
- University Hospital
- 1000-Watt Radio Station (dxVL KOOL FM, PBS-affiliate)
- Hostel and Function Hall
- Philippine Industrial Crops Research Institute (PICRI)
- University of Southern Mindanao Agricultural Research Center (USMARC)
- Philippine Carabao Center (PCC) – a member of the PCC Network
- Philippine Rubber Testing Center (PRTC)
- Cotabato Agricultural and Resources Research and Development Consortium (CARRDEC)
- Veterinary Hospital
- Soil and Plant Laboratory Analysis
- Molecular and Tissue Culture Laboratory

== Affiliations and links ==
USM maintains affiliations and partnerships with local and international government agencies, non-governmental organizations (NGOs), private-sector companies, and academic institutions for research, development, extension, and teaching.

== Publications ==
The university produces several publications, including USM Press, USM Monitor, Techno Guide, and the USM R&D Journal. The official student magazine is Mindanao Tech. Additionally, each college and institute has its own student publication.
