= Carlos P. Garcia National Highway =

Road in Davao City, Philippines

Carlos P. Garcia National Highway
- Davao City Diversion Road
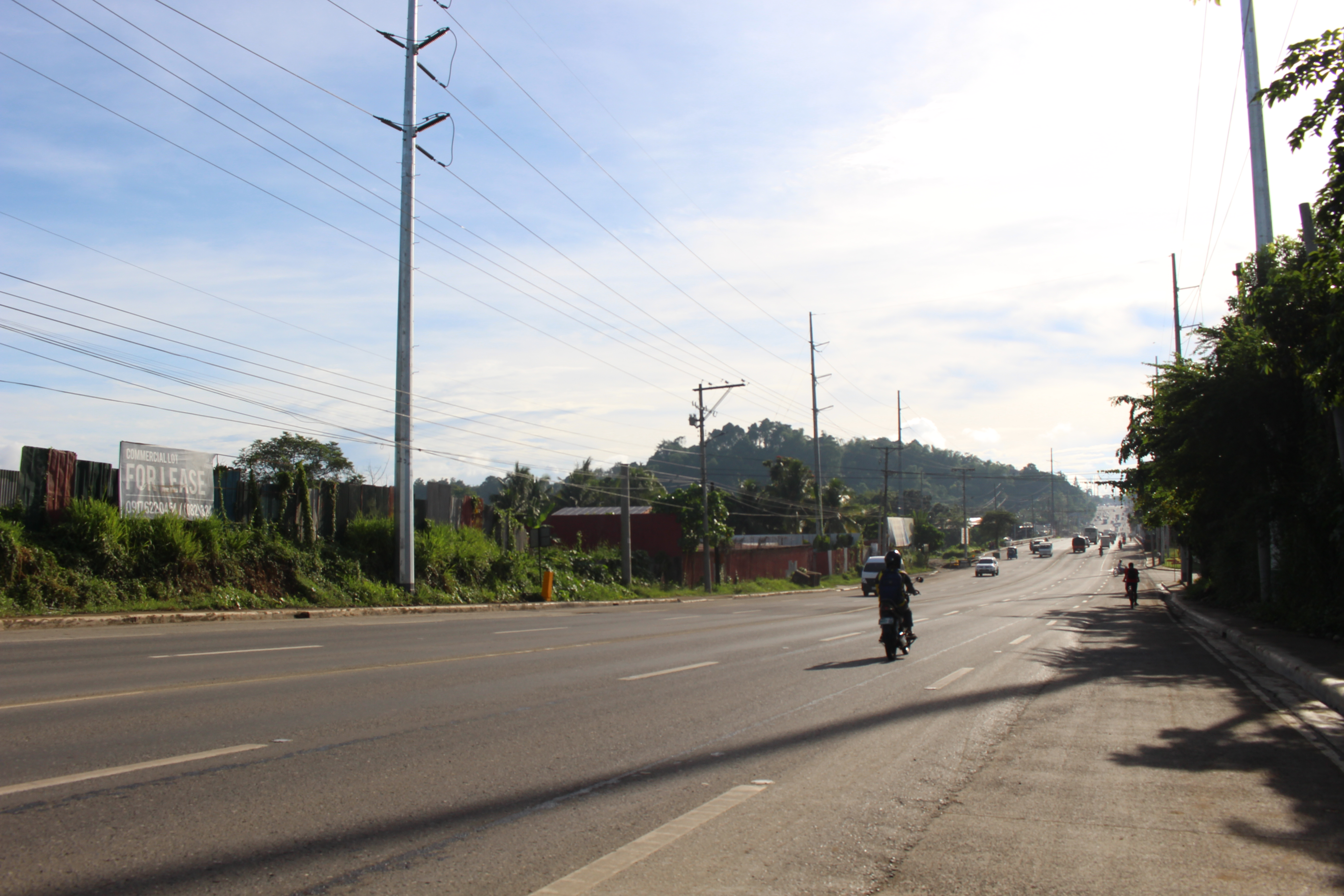
- Carlos P. Garcia National Highway

Route information
- Maintained by the Department of Public Works and Highways
- Length: 22 km (14 mi)
- Component highways: N1

Major junctions
- Northeast end: AH 26 (N1) / AH 26 (N916-5) (Davao-Agusan National Highway) in Panacan, Davao City
- N915-1 in Buhangin, Davao City; N918 (Buhangin–Lapanday Road) in Buhangin, Davao City; N921 (Ma-a Road) in Ma-a, Davao City
- Southwest end: AH 26 (N1) / AH 26 (N916-5) (McArthur Highway) in Talomo, Davao City

Location
- Country: Philippines
- Major cities: Davao City

Highway system
- Roads in the Philippines; Highways; Expressways; List

The Carlos P. Garcia National Highway, also known as the Davao City Diversion Road, is a 18-kilometer (11 mi) six-to-eight lane major highway that serves as a diversion route from the Davao city proper. It also serves as one of the major roads in Davao when traversing towards Tagum.

Currently, the highway serves as the main diversion road for Davao City while the new bypass road is under construction.

Previously designated as National Route 913 (N913), it forms part of National Route 1 (N1) of the Philippine highway network.

== History ==
In 1955, Executive Order No. 113 was issued by President Ramon Magsaysay, declaring the highway as a national secondary road. It was declared a national secondary road due to the recommendation of the former National Transportation Board. Therefore, the highway is currently maintained by Department of Public Works and Highways (DPWH) as it was strengthened into a Department Order No. 90 in 1977.

In 2025, by virtue of the DPWH's Department Order No. 150 series of 2025, it was upgraded to a national primary road, effectively changing its route number from N913 to N1. The N1 designation was previously assigned to the segments of the Pan-Philippine Highway through the Davao City proper, but these sections were subsequently reclassified as secondary national roads under N916-5.
