= Kabacan =

Municipality in Cotabato, Philippines

- Municipality
- Municipality of Kabacan
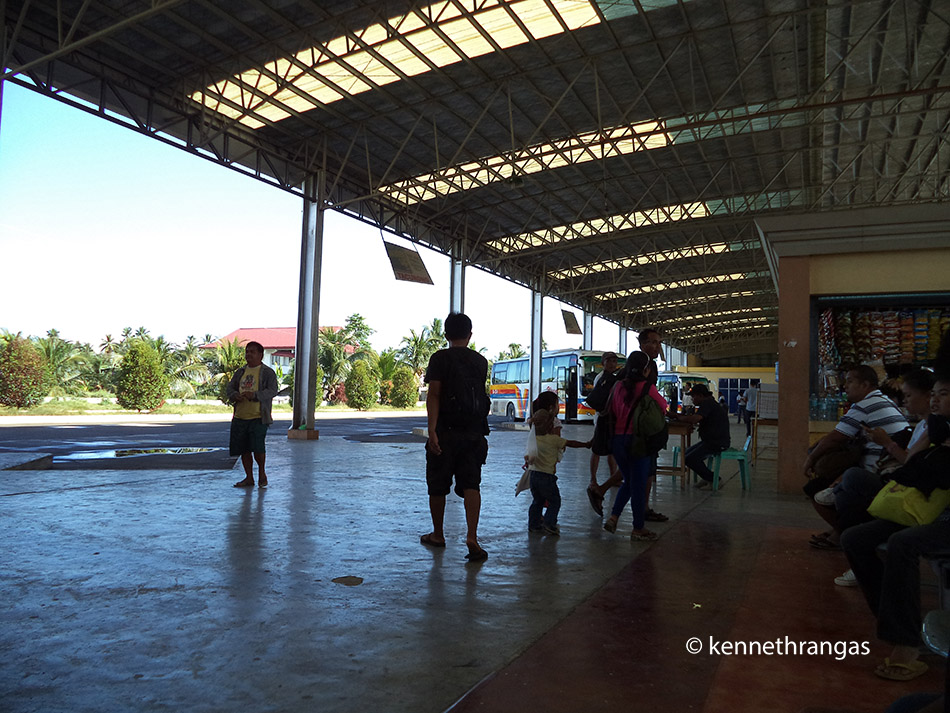
- Kabacan bus terminal

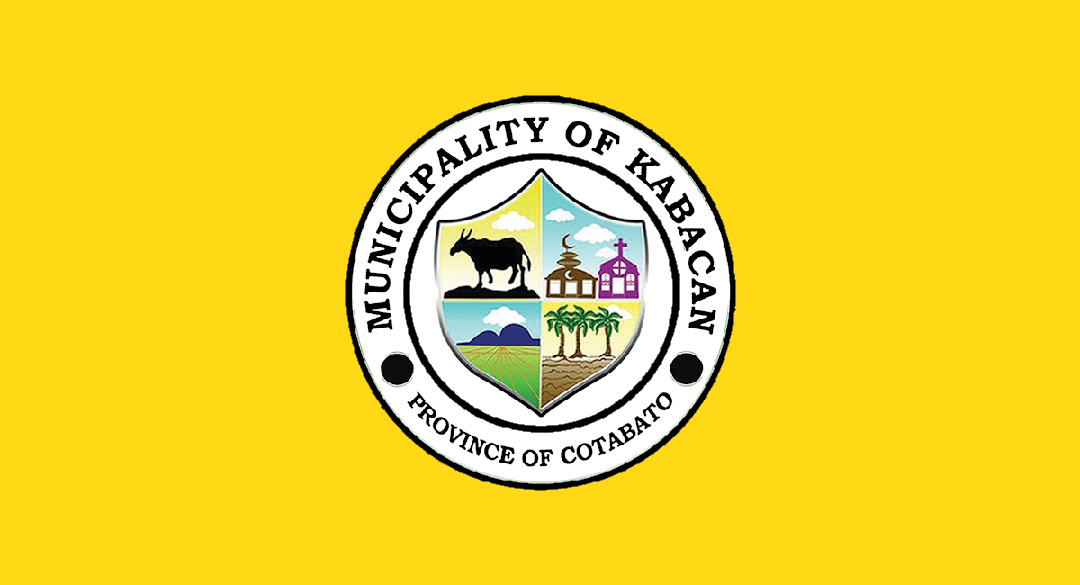
- Flag Seal
- Nicknames: Heart of Cotabato; Crossroads of Mindanao
- Map of Cotabato with Kabacan highlighted
- Interactive map of Kabacan
- Location within the Philippines
- Coordinates: 7°06′31″N 124°49′25″E
- Country: Philippines
- Region: Soccsksargen
- Province: Cotabato
- District: 3rd district
- Founded: August 18, 1947
- Barangays: 24 (see Barangays)

Government
  - Type: Sangguniang Bayan
  - Mayor: Evangeline Pascua-Guzman
  - Vice Mayor: Herlo P. Guzman, Jr
  - Representative: Jose I. Tejada
  - Electorate: 47,633 voters (2025)

Area
  - Total: 330.92 km^{2} (127.77 sq mi)
- Elevation: 21 m (69 ft)
- Highest elevation: 47 m (154 ft)
- Lowest elevation: 8 m (26 ft)

Population (2024 census)
  - Total: 77,945
  - Density: 235.54/km^{2} (610.05/sq mi)
- 17,891
- Demonym: Kabaqueño/a

Economy
  - Income class: 1st municipal income class
  - Poverty incidence: 19.98% (2023)
  - Revenue: ₱ 376.5 million (2024)
  - Assets: ₱ 862.7 million (2024)
  - Expenditure: ₱ 213.7 million (2024)
  - Liabilities: ₱ 154.9 million (2024)

Service provider
  - Electricity: Cotabato Electric Cooperative (COTELCO)
- Time zone: UTC+8 (PST)
- ZIP code: 9407
- PSGC: 1204703000
- IDD : area code: +63 (0)64
- Native languages: Hiligaynon; Cebuano; Maguindanao; Ilianen; Tagalog
- Website: kabacan.gov.ph

Kabacan officially the Municipality of Kabacan (Maguindanaon: Inged nu Kabakan, Jawi: ايڠد نو كباكن; Ilocano: Ili ti Kabacan; Hiligaynon: Banwa sang Kabacan; Cebuano: Lungsod sa Kabacan; Tagalog: Bayan ng Kabacan), is a municipality in the province of Cotabato, Philippines. According to the 2024 census, it has a population of 77,945 people.

The town is predominantly composed of rice farms made possible by the influx of Ilocano-speaking people from northern Philippines. The University of Southern Mindanao is in Kabacan. It is strategically located between the cities of Cotabato and Davao from west to east and the cities of Cagayan de Oro and Iligan from the north and General Santos from the south.

== History ==
Kabacan got its name from the word "ka-abacan" which means the source of abundance. People from far-flung barangays used to come to this place and, upon returning home, they brought with them many commodities of their livelihood.

The municipality of Kabacan was a barrio of the municipal district of Pikit before its creation as a district political body. It was created as a regular municipality by virtue of Executive Order No. 82 dated August 18, 1947, issued by President Manuel Roxas of the Republic of the Philippines.

Growth was gradual under the domain of Datu Mantawil; that influx of settlers from Luzon and Visayas arrived in the 1930s. This was made so when the McLareen family sold its hacienda to Jose Yulo Alano, Rafael Alunan and party who organize a company under the cooperate name of Rio Grande Estate. The company became the people's place of business and social center. Recognizing his immense power and leadership over the area, the provincial governor of Cotabato organizes the Kabacan into a Municipal District with Esteban Somera Abellera Sr. its first mayor in 1935.

=== World War II ===
After the Japanese landing on Davao, the Miura Detachment then proceeded to advance towards Kabacan but had to struggle fighting the remaining Filipino-American resistance. Soon, they succeed in capturing Kabacan on May 3, 1942.

The Rio Grande Rubber Estate was sold by the Filipino Incorporators to the Japanese Imperial Government. It became the site for the provisional municipal government with Cenon Doctolero as the appointed mayor. The Japanese garrison was attacked October 25, 1942, by guerrilla forces under U.S. Lieut. Col. Wendell Fertig. During a fourteen-day siege sixty-eight of the seventy-six Japanese garrison were killed. Only the arrival of reinforcements saved the garrison and caused the guerrillas to withdraw.

Currently, Kabacan is known as an Ilocano-speaking area since 65% of its population Ilocano immigrants and their native born descendants.

=== Partial inclusion to the Bangsamoro ===
In 2019, seven barangays were among the 63 in the province which became part of the Special Geographic Area of the newly created Bangsamoro, after having the affirmative vote won to join the autonomous region in a plebiscite held on February 6. Nanga-an, Simbuhay, and Sanggadong were among the 39 in the province that unsuccessfully voted for the inclusion in the Autonomous Region in Muslim Mindanao in 2001, while the other four were proposed to be part of the Bangsamoro, which replaced ARMM by virtue of Republic Act No. 11054.

In 2023, the Bangsamoro Parliament approved the creation of eight new municipalities in the area. Those barangays were organized into Old Kaabakan (Bangsamoro Autonomy Act No. 44) following ratification in a plebiscite on April 13, 2024.

== Geography ==
Kabacan is centrally located in Cotabato province, bounded on the north by President Roxas, on the east by Matalam, on the south by M'lang, and on the west by Carmen and Datu Montawal. It is approximately 94 kilometres (58 mi) from Cotabato airport, 194 kilometres (121 mi) to Davao airport and 188 kilometres (117 mi) to General Santos International Airport.

The landscape is characterized by almost regular landscape of flat terrain. The high mountains and rolling hills leaping close to the river plus the narrow plains have varied topographical features. Other features are moderately sloping and strongly sloping.

Bodies of Water

The Kabacan River is a tributary of the Pulangi River, discharging at Kayaga Kabacan, Cotabato.

=== Barangays ===
Kabacan is politically subdivided into 17 barangays. Each barangay consists of puroks while some have sitios.

- Aringay
- Bangilan
- Bannawag, formerly known as Banawa
- Cuyapon
- Dagupan
- Katidtuan
- Kayaga
- Kilagasan
- Magatos
- Malamote
- Malanduague
- Osias
- Paatan Lower
- Paatan Upper
- Pisan
- Poblacion
- Salapungan

=== Climate ===
Climate data for Kabacan, Cotabato
Month	Jan	Feb	Mar	Apr	May	Jun	Jul	Aug	Sep	Oct	Nov	Dec	Year
Mean daily maximum °C (°F)	31 (88)	32 (90)	33 (91)	33 (91)	32 (90)	31 (88)	30 (86)	31 (88)	31 (88)	31 (88)	31 (88)	31 (88)	31 (89)
Mean daily minimum °C (°F)	21 (70)	21 (70)	21 (70)	22 (72)	23 (73)	23 (73)	23 (73)	23 (73)	23 (73)	23 (73)	23 (73)	22 (72)	22 (72)
Average precipitation mm (inches)	19 (0.7)	14 (0.6)	15 (0.6)	18 (0.7)	33 (1.3)	42 (1.7)	44 (1.7)	42 (1.7)	30 (1.2)	31 (1.2)	28 (1.1)	17 (0.7)	333 (13.2)
Average rainy days	6.9	5.6	6.9	8.1	15.1	17.5	17.8	18.5	14.9	14.9	12.4	8.0	146.6
Source: Meteoblue

Type B climate prevails in the municipality. It is characterized by dry season for one to three months with less than 76 millimeters or more rainfall per month throughout the year. The wettest month has more than three times the rainfall of the driest month. This type of climate is conducive to intensive rice cultivation and plantings of bananas and other fruit trees.

== Demographics ==
Population census of Kabacan
Year	Pop.	±% p.a.
1903	78	—
1918	5,394	+32.63%
1939	8,659	+2.28%
1948	13,119	+4.72%
1960	21,043	+4.02%
1970	22,769	+0.79%
1975	39,378	+11.61%
1980	43,443	+1.98%
1990	50,601	+1.54%
1995	61,481	+3.72%
2000	61,998	+0.18%
2007	73,991	+2.47%
2010	81,282	+3.48%
2015	89,161	+1.78%
2020	77,164	−3.00%
2024	77,945	+0.24%
Source: Philippine Statistics Authority; 2020 Census count was revised as per PSA Board Resolution; No. 13 Series of 2021 adopted on November 9, 2021.

In the 2024 census, the population of Kabacan was 77,945 people, with a density of 170 inhabitants per square kilometre or 440 inhabitants per square mile.

== Economy ==
Poverty incidence of Kabacan (%)

Source: Philippine Statistics Authority

Commercial activities are in the Public Market and along the National Highway and USM Avenue. Kabacan serve as a business and trading center for the adjacent municipalities of Carmen, Pagagawan, Pikit and Matalam. The majority of the commercial establishments are engaged in general merchandising, sari-sari and dry goods. One big shopping center and drug store owned by a big company are along the National Highway. There are four banks and three gasoline stations.

Other small-scale industries are electronics and repair shop, car/motor vehicle body builder/repair shop, vulcanizing and machine shop, shoe and appliance repair shops hollow blocks/culvert making basket/mat weaving, dressmaking/tailoring, balut making, bakery and Mascovado factory in Barangay Malanduage.

=== Natural resources ===
Primarily agricultural crops include corn, rice, soybeans, peanut, mongo, cassava and other field crops. This town is popularly known as the "Rice Production Center", the "Rice Granary of the Province of Cotabato". Its populace has devoted most of its fertile domain to rice production. Corn is the secondary crop of this town.

== Education ==
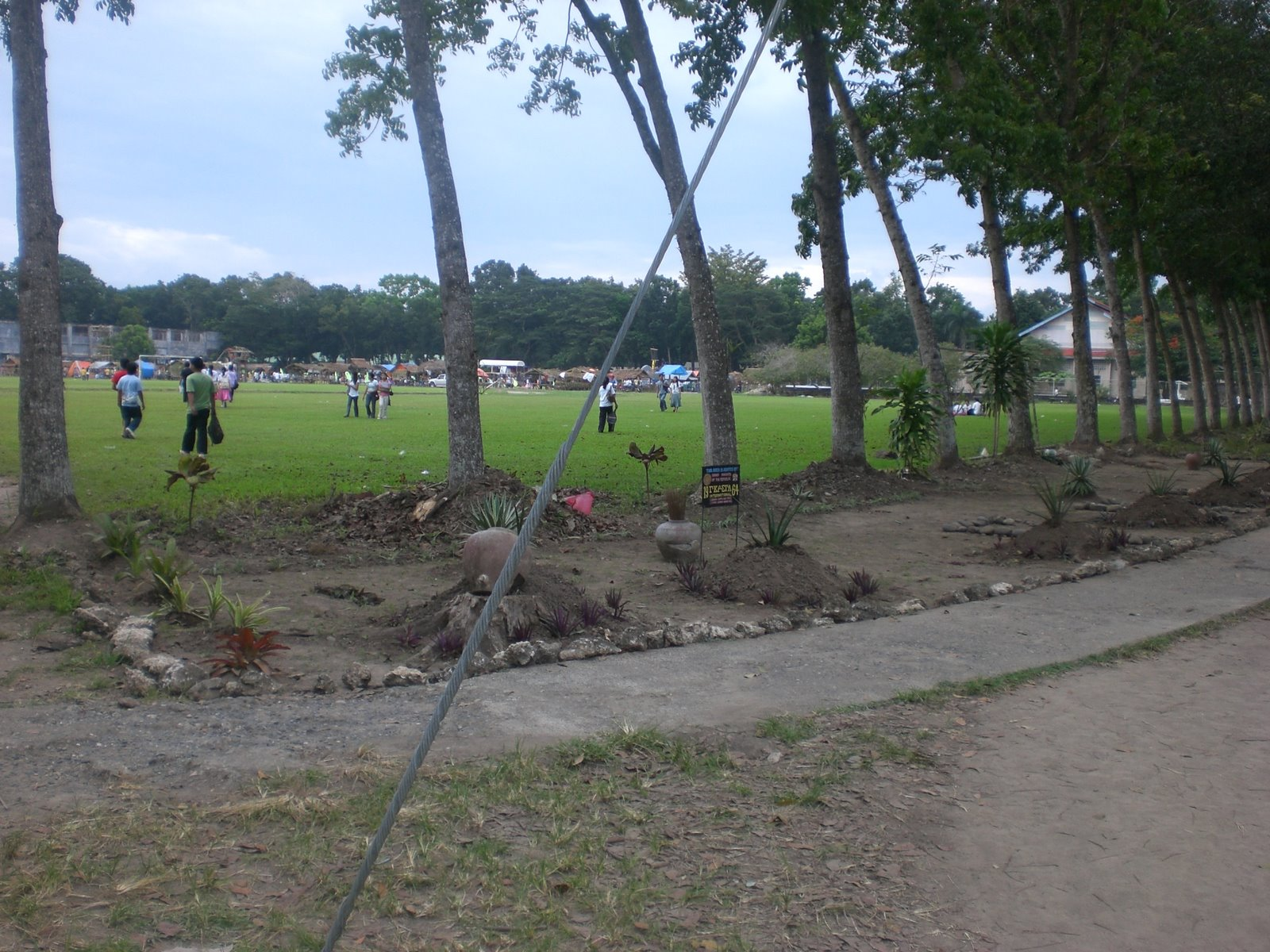
University of Southern Mindanao

Colleges and universities

- University of Southern Mindanao
- St. Luke's Institute
- Asian Colleges and Technological Institute

High school

Public:

- Kabacan National High School-Main Campus
- Osias High School
- Nangaan High School
- Gil Manalo High School
- Bannawag National High School

Private:

- University Laboratory School (science-curriculum based High School located in the University of Southern Mindanao)
- St. Luke's Institute
- Kabacan Wesleyan Academy
- Asian Colleges and Technological Institute
- Notre Dame of Kabacan, Inc.
- Berean Christian School

Elementary

Public:

- Kabacan Pilot Central School
- Katidtuan Central Elementary School
- Osias Elementary School
- USM Annex Elementary School
- Lower Paatan Elementary School
- Upper Paatan Elementary School
- Cuyapon Elementary School
- Kilagasan Elementary School
- Dona Josefa E Marcos Elementary School

Private:

- Enhanced Childhood Learning Center, Inc.
- DD Clemente Academy-Montessori
- Kabacan Wesleyan Academy
- Notre Dame of Kabacan, Inc.
- Berean Christian School

== Tourism ==
- Pisan Cave at Pisan, Kabacan.
- Waterfalls and spring at Tamped, Kabacan
- Nangaan Cliff at Nangaan, Kabacan
- Nangaan Caves and Waterfalls
- Kabuling Waterfalls at Simbuhay, Kabacan
- Simbuhay Waterfalls at Simbuhay, Kabacan
- Matibuhaw Cave at Simbuhay, Kabacan
- Kalasan Waterfalls at Pedtad, Kabacan
- Crocodile Farm at Cuyapon, Kabacan
- Garagan Spring Resort at Katidtuan, Kabacan
- University of Southern Mindanao located at Kabacan town proper. A State University with research and training centers, open amphitheaters, sports facilities and pilot agricultural projects.
- Waterland Resort at Osias, Kabacan
