= Larose =

Larose, LaRose or La Rose may refer to:

== People ==
- Larose (surname), including a list of people with the surname Larose or LaRose
- La Rose (surname), including a list of people with the surname

== Places ==
- Larose, Louisiana, United States
- La Rose, Illinois, United States
- Larose Forest, Ontario, Canada

== Other uses ==
- LaRose (novel), by Louise Erdrich, 2016
- La Woz (Antillean Creole for 'The Rose'), a historic cultural society of Saint Lucia

== See also ==
- De la Rose (disambiguation)
- La Rose, la violette et le papillon ('The Rose, the Violet, and the Butterfly') an 1857 ballet
