= Dela Rosa =

Dela Rosa may refer to:

- Dela Rosa railway station, station on the South Main Line ("Southrail") of the Philippine National Railways
- Dela Rosa Transit, a city bus company in the Philippines
- De La Rosa, people with the name
