= De la Rose (surname) =

De la Rose is a surname. Notable people with the surname include:

- Erik de la Rose (born 1993), Swedish ice hockey player
- Jacob de la Rose (born 1995), Swedish ice hockey player, brother of Erik
- Jean-Baptiste de La Rose (1612–1687), French painter and draughtsman
- De La Rose (singer) (born 2001), Puerto Rican singer-songwriter

== See also ==
- De La Rosa, a surname
- De la Rue (disambiguation)
- De la Roche family
- De La Rose (horse), racehorse
- Larose (surname)
- La Rose (surname)
