= Larose (surname) =

Larose or LaRose is a surname. Notable people with the surname include:

== Politics and activism ==
- Achille Larose (1839-1904), Canadian politician
- Frank LaRose (born 1979), American politician
- Gérald Larose (born 1945), Canadian activist
- Jean-François Larose (born 1972), Canadian politician

== Sports ==
=== Baseball ===
- John LaRose (1951–2021), American baseball player
- Vic LaRose (1944–2011), American baseball player

=== Gridiron football ===
- Dan LaRose (1939–2019), American football player
- J. R. LaRose (born 1984), Canadian football player

=== Ice hockey ===
- Bonner Larose (1901-1963), Canadian ice hockey player
- Chad LaRose (born 1982), American ice hockey player
- Claude Larose (disambiguation), multiple people
- Cory Larose (born 1975), Canadian ice hockey player
- Guy Larose (born 1967), Canadian ice hockey player
- Paul Larose (born 1950), Canadian ice hockey player
- Ray LaRose (born 1941), Canadian ice hockey player

=== Other sports ===
- David Larose (born 1985), French judoka
- Gilbert Larose (1942-2006), Canadian gymnast
- Guy Larose, Canadian professional wrestler known as Hans Schmidt
- Simon Larose (born 1978), Canadian tennis player

== Other fields ==
- Colleen LaRose (born 1963), American citizen
- Ferdinand Larose (1888-1955), Canadian forester
- J. Larose, Navajo actor
- Raun Larose (born 1986), American fashion designer

== See also ==
- De la Rose (surname)
- La Rose (surname)
