= De La Rosa =

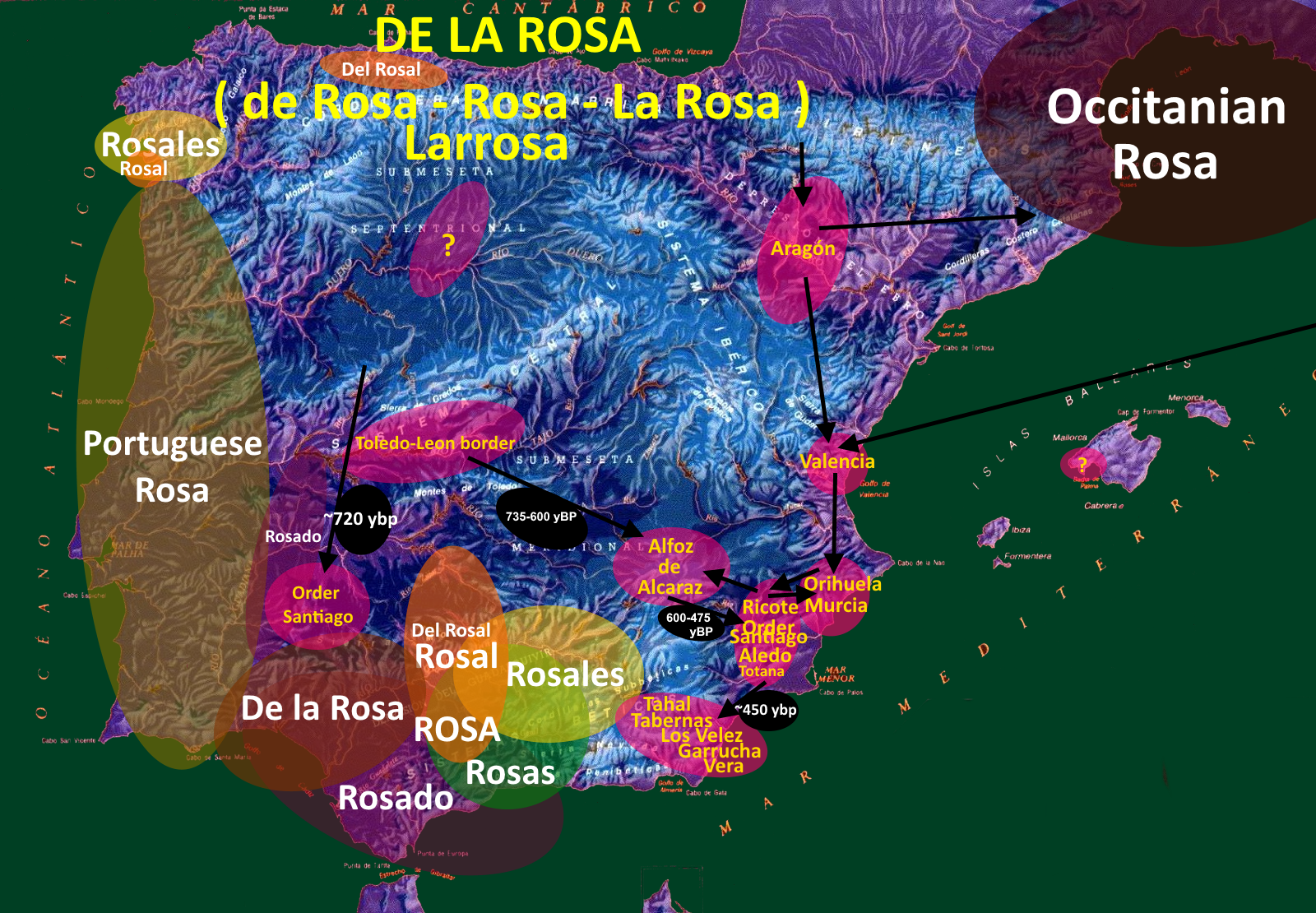
Expansion of the De La Rosa surname

De la Rosa is a Spanish surname, which means "of the rose". The name De la Rosa (or variants of the name) may refer to:

== People with the name De la Rosa ==
- Dane De La Rosa (born 1983), American baseball player
- Domingo Vega de la Rosa (born 1953), Spanish painter
- Eduardo Verano de la Rosa (born 1950), Colombian politician
- Erika de la Rosa (born 1980), Mexican actress
- Eury De La Rosa (born 1990), Dominican baseball player
- Francisco de la Rosa (1966–2011), Dominican baseball player
- Jaime de la Rosa (1921–1992), Filipino actor
- James de la Rosa (born 1987), Mexican boxer
- Javier de la Rosa (born 1947), Spanish businessman
- Jesús de la Rosa (born 1953), Dominican baseball player
- Jorge de la Rosa (born 1981), Mexican baseball player
- José de la Rosa, Mexican musician
- Lenny de la Rosa (born 1983), Cuban actor
- Nelson de la Rosa (1968–2006), Dominican actor
- Oscar De La Rosa (born 1960), American singer
- Pedro de la Rosa (born 1971), Spanish racing driver
- Roberto De la Rosa (born 2000), Mexican football player
- Rodrigo de la Rosa (born 1982), Mexican actor
- Rogelio de la Rosa (1916–1986), Filipino politician
- Rolando de la Rosa (born 1953), Filipino educator
- Rubby De La Rosa (born 1989), Dominican baseball player
- Secun de la Rosa (born 1969), Spanish actor
- Tomás de la Rosa (born 1978), Dominican baseball player
- Tony de la Rosa (1931–2004), Mexican-American musician
- Tony De La Rosa, guitarist for the band Renegade
- Victor De La Rosa, American visual artist, educator

== People with the name Dela Rosa ==
- Camille Dela Rosa (born 1982), Filipino painter
- Lita dela Rosa (died 1994), Filipino ten-pin bowling player
- Rome dela Rosa (born 1990), Filipino basketball player
- Ronald dela Rosa (born 1962), Filipino police officer; Director General of the Director of the Bureau of Corrections in 2018

== Fictional characters ==
- Maya dela Rosa, one of the main characters in ABS-CBN's 2012-2014 romantic drama TV series Be Careful with My Heart
- Oscar Joaquin de la Rosa, grandfather to Chad in the manga and anime series Bleach

== See also ==
- Hayim de lah Rozah, Spanish rabbi
- Dela Rosa (disambiguation)
