= Candelaria Bypass Road =

Road in the Philippines

Candelaria Bypass Road
- Candelaria Diversion Road

Route information
- Maintained by Department of Public Works and Highways – Quezon 2nd District Engineering Office
- Length: 7.546 km (4.689 mi)
- Existed: 2012–present

Major junctions
- West end: AH26 (Pan-Philippine Highway) in Candelaria
- N422-1 (Rosario–San Juan–Candelaria Road) in Candelaria
- East end: AH26 (Pan-Philippine Highway) in Candelaria

Location
- Country: Philippines
- Provinces: Quezon
- Towns: Candelaria

Highway system
- Roads in the Philippines; Highways; Expressways; List
← N608	→ N610

Candelaria Bypass Road, also known as Candelaria Diversion Road, is a 7.5-kilometer (4.7 mi) national secondary road in the town of Candelaria, Quezon. Inaugurated in September 2012, it bypasses the town proper of Candelaria. It was initiated as a project of former Quezon 2nd district Representative Irvin Alcala as an effort to decongest traffic at Pan-Philippine Highway.

The entire road is designated as National Route 609 (N609) of the Philippine highway network.

== Route description ==
The two- to four-lane bypass road bypasses the town proper of Candelaria. Travelers thus cut the travel time from Pan-Philippine Highway (Maharlika Highway), which traverses into the town proper.

It starts at the Pan-Philippine Highway in Barangay Bukal Sur, turning southwest to Barangays Masin Sur, Pahinga Norte, Malabanban Sur and Mangilag Sur. It intersects the San Juan–Candelaria Road at Malabanban Sur and crosses the Philippine National Railway track in Mangilag Sur. It reunites with Maharlika Highway at its eastern end.

== Intersections ==
The entire route is located in Candelaria, Quezon. Intersections are numbered by kilometer post, with the Rizal Park in Manila designated as kilometer 0.

km	mi	Destinations	Notes
104.25	64.78	AH26 (Maharlika Highway)	Western terminus
105.52	65.57	Baloyboy Road	
106.838	66.386	Masin Bridge over Masin River	
107.65	66.89	Cabunag Street / Pahinga Road	
107.807	66.988	Quiapo Bridge over Quiapo River	
108.82	67.62	N422-1 (Rosario–San Juan–Candelaria Road)	
110.61	68.73	Railroad crossing - Philippine National Railways	
111.79	69.46	AH26 (Maharlika Highway)	Eastern terminus
1.000 mi = 1.609 km; 1.000 km = 0.621 mi
