= Candelaria, Quezon =

Municipality in Quezon, Philippines

Candelaria
- Municipality
- Municipality of Candelaria
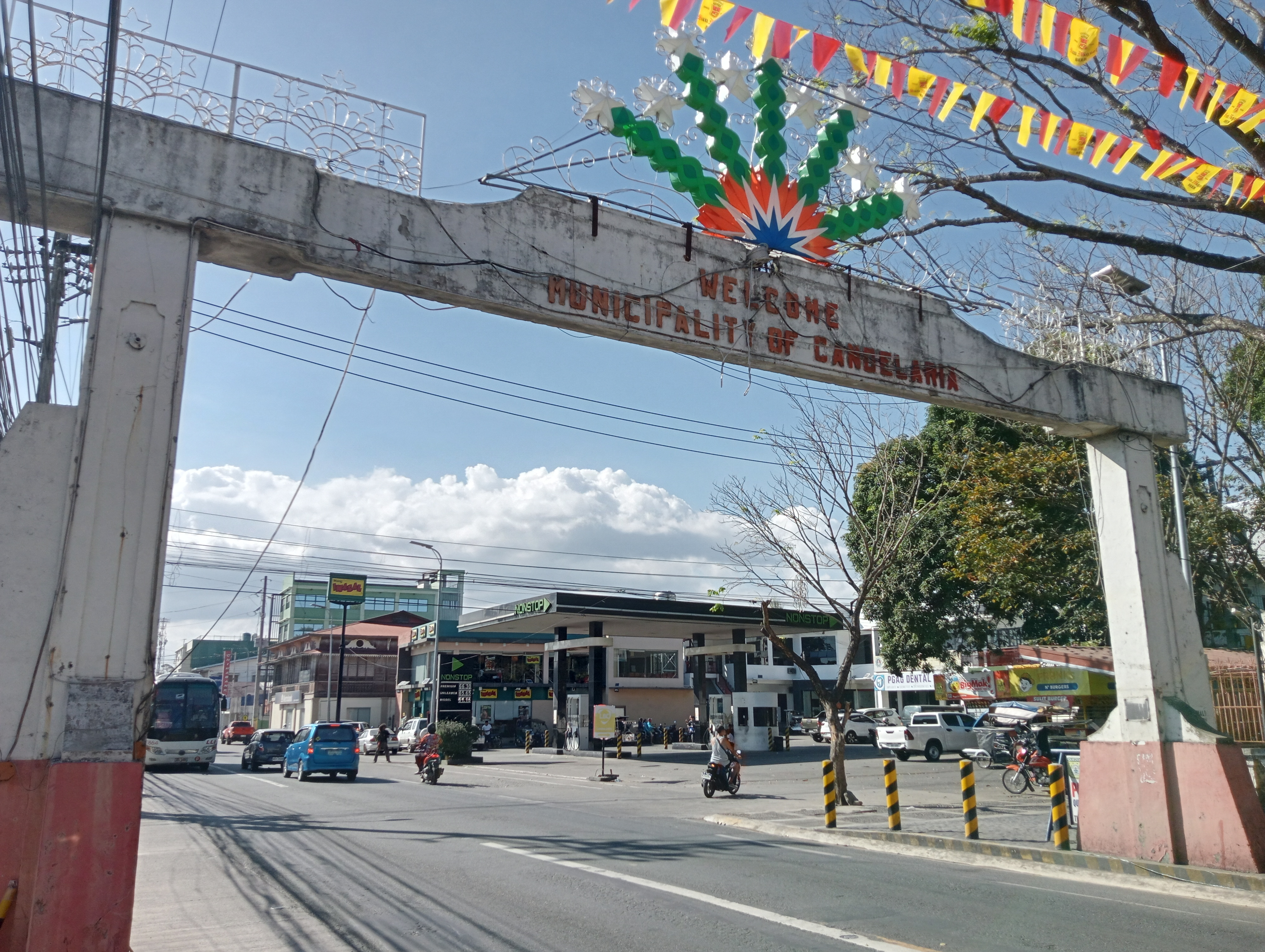
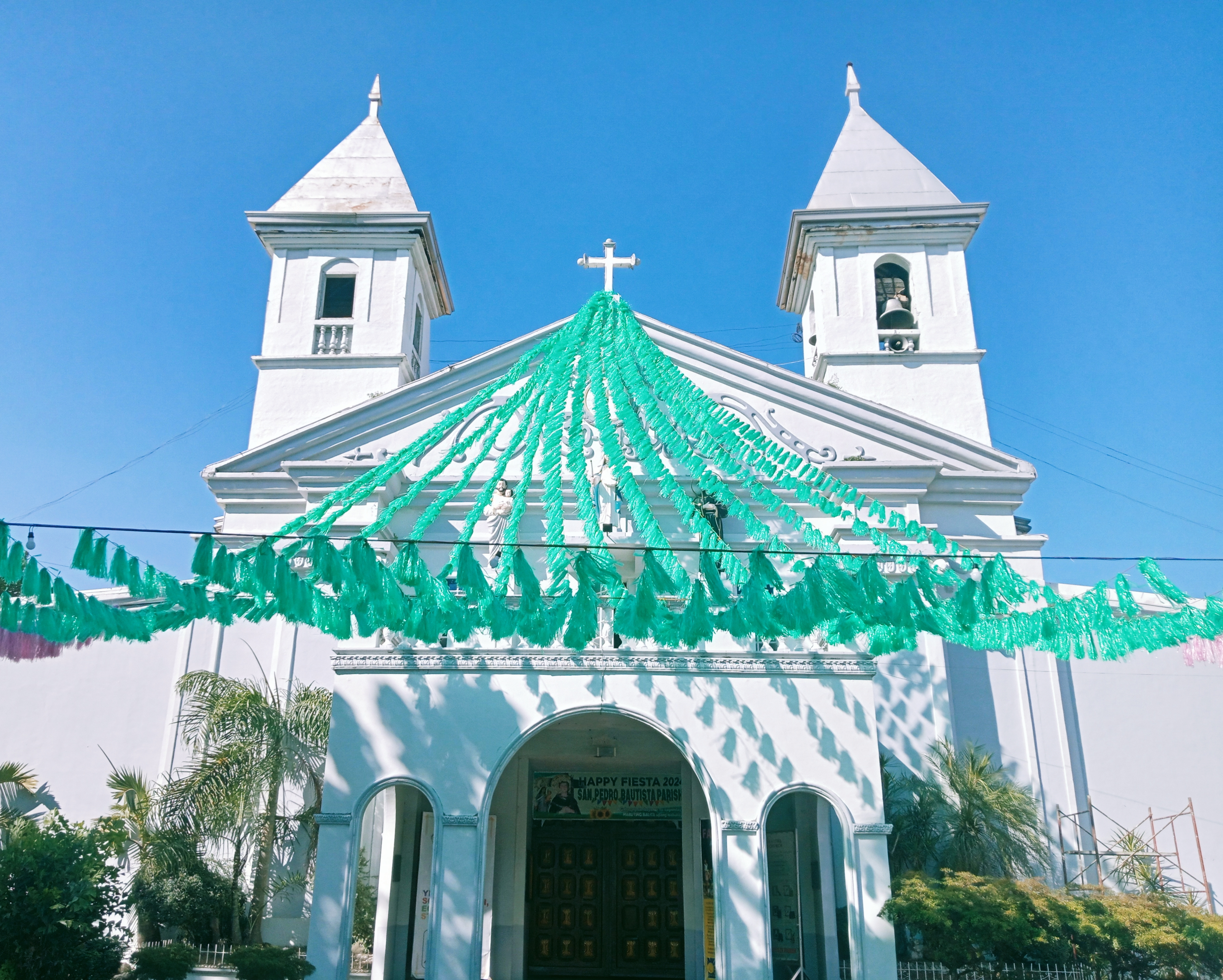
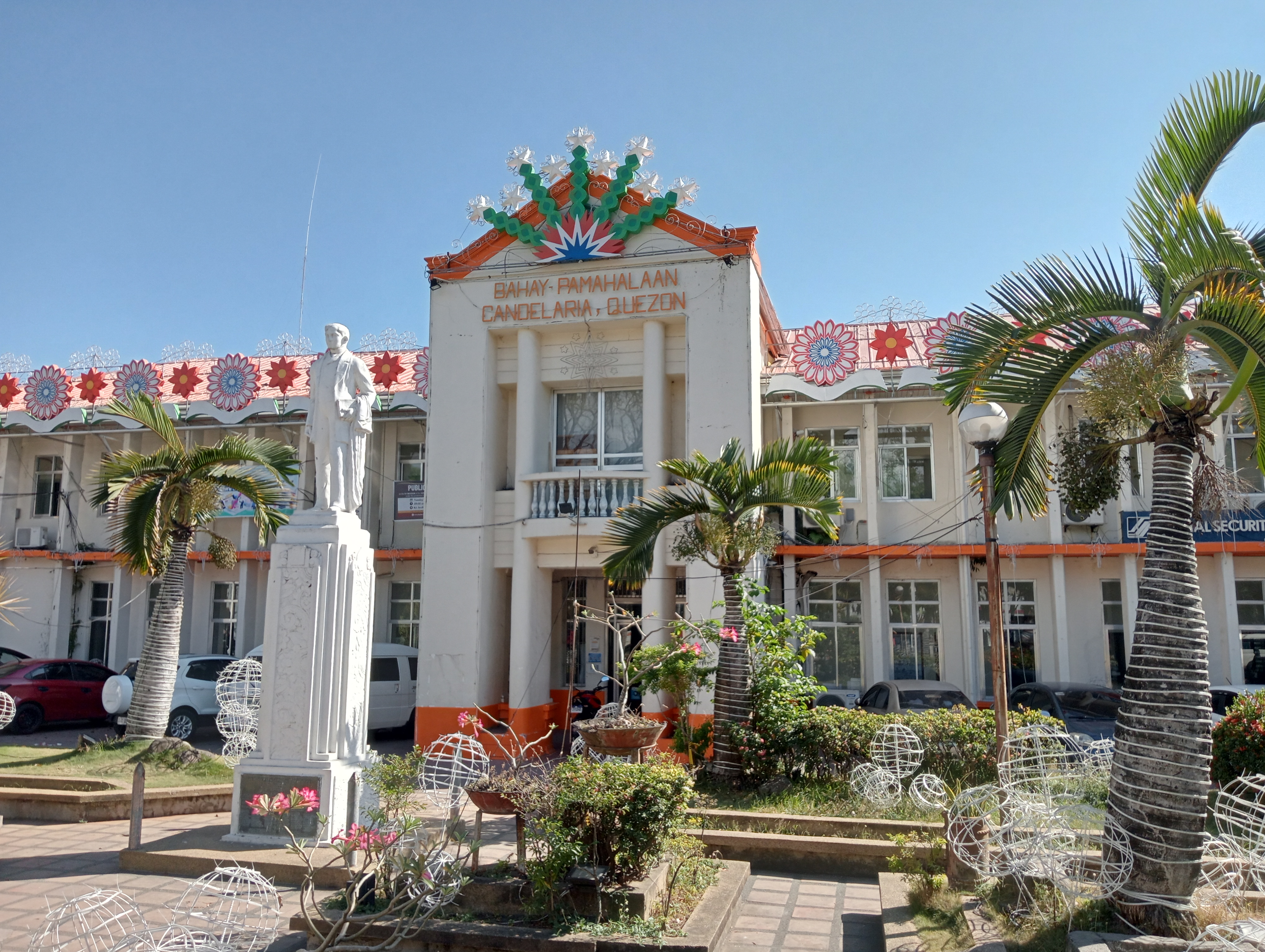
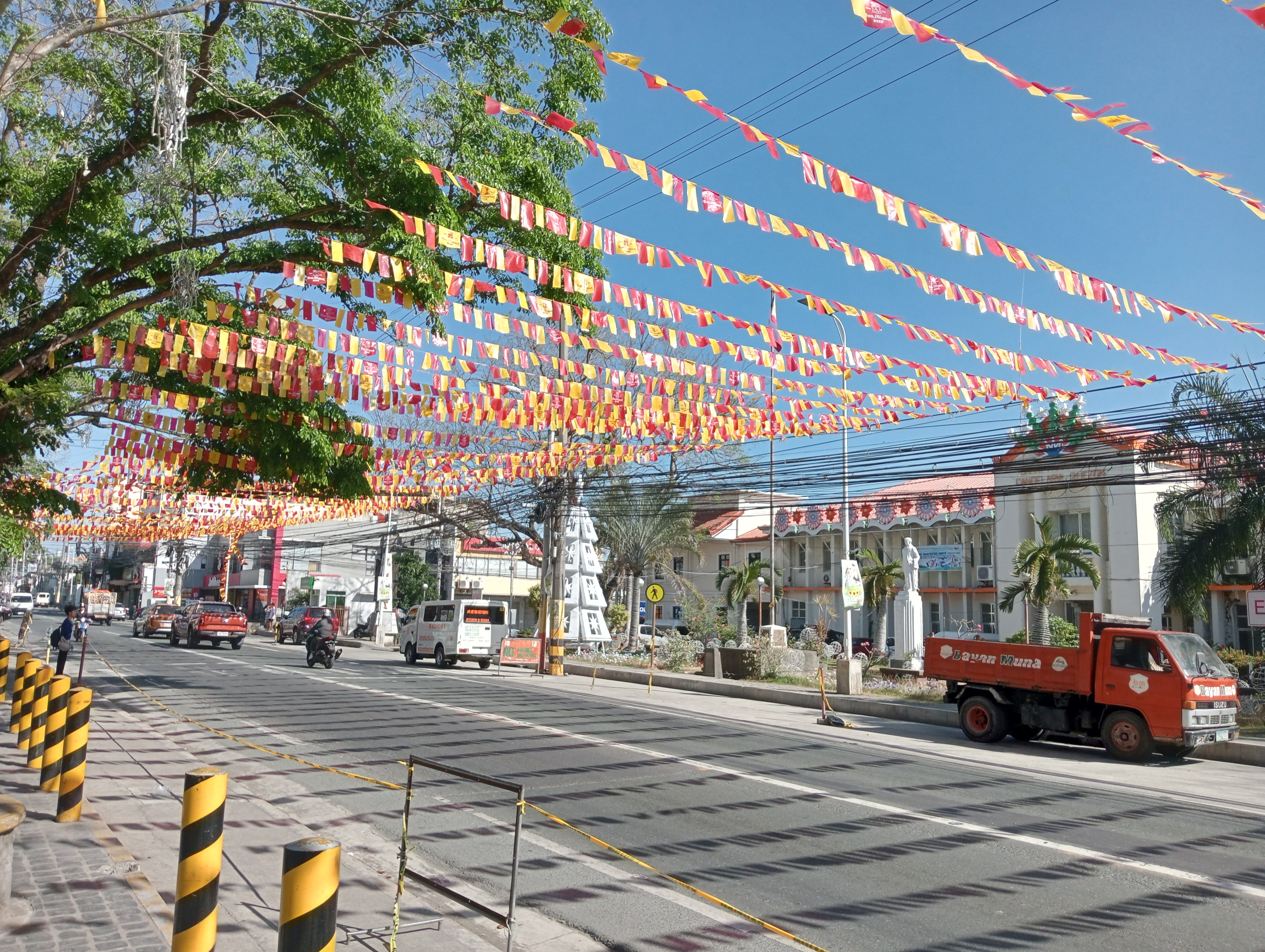
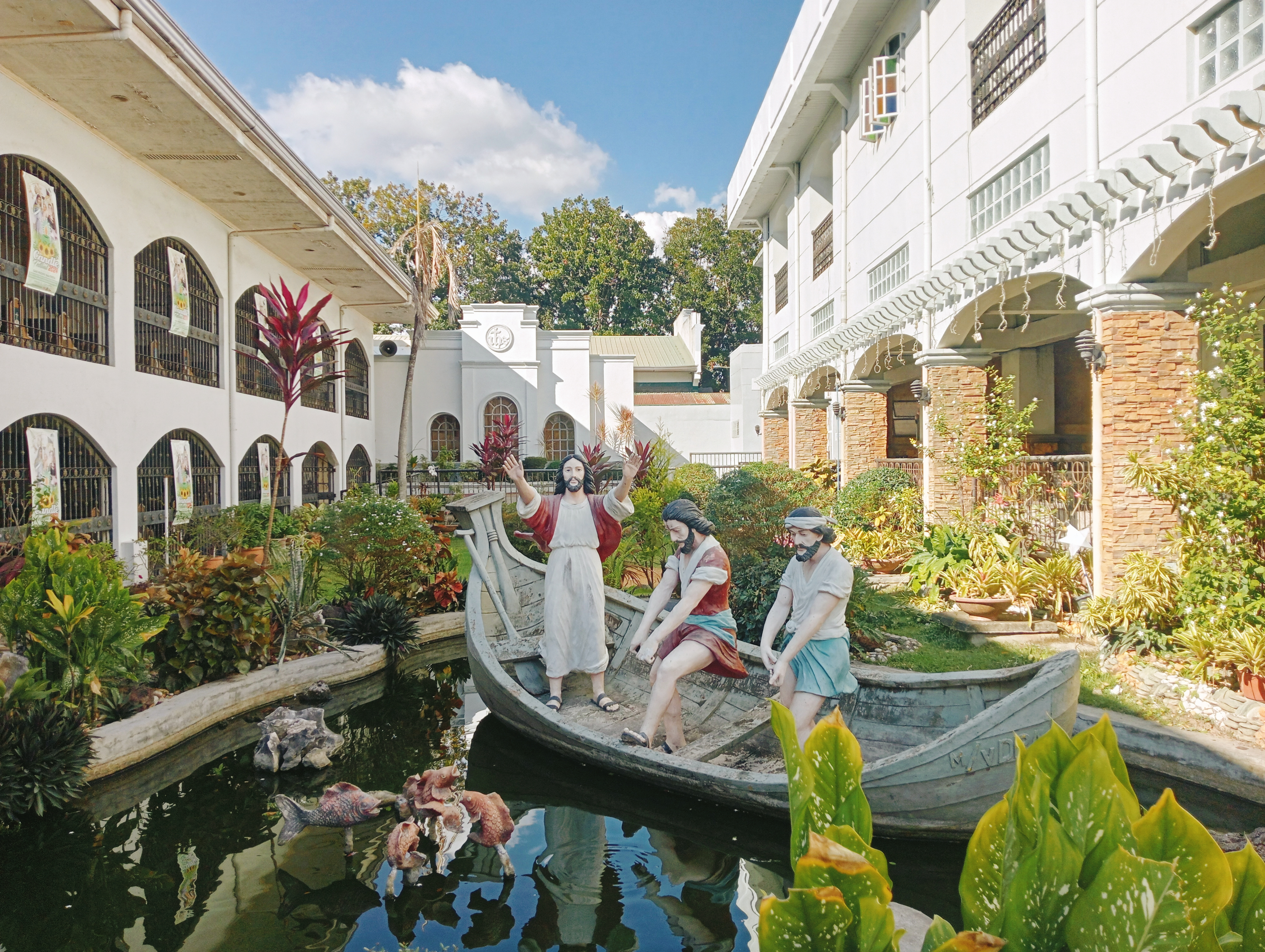
- (from top, left to right): Welcome Arch, San Pedro Bautista Parish Church, Municipal Hall, Downtown Area, Devotional Candle Park

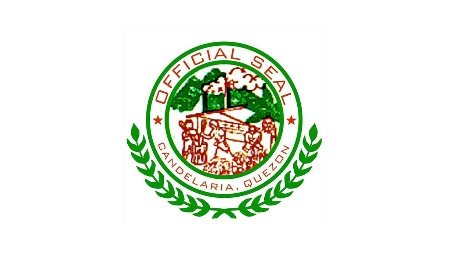
- Flag Seal
- Nicknames: Industrial Town of Quezon; Desiccated Coconut Capital
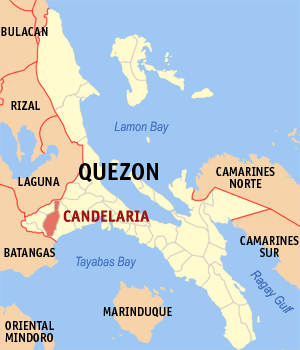
- Map of Quezon with Candelaria highlighted
- Interactive map of Candelaria
- Location within the Philippines
- Coordinates: 13°55′52″N 121°25′24″E
- Country: Philippines
- Region: Calabarzon
- Province: Quezon
- District: 2nd district
- Founded: August 5, 1879
- Annexation to Sariaya: May 17, 1902
- Reestablished: September 20, 1907
- Barangays: 25 (see Barangays)

Government
  - Type: Sangguniang Bayan
  - Mayor: George D. Suayan
  - Vice Mayor: Ireneo C. Boongaling
  - Representative: David C. Suarez
  - Municipal Council: Members: Davielyn A. Alcala; Aileen M. Dellosa; Estelito A. Sulit; Joy Anne M. Pasumbal; Numeriano S. Briones; Anatalia R. Atienza; Manuel Antonio V. De Luna; Maria Lourdes Bernadette G. Liwanag
  - Electorate: 89,174 voters (2025)

Area
  - Total: 129.10 km^{2} (49.85 sq mi)
- Elevation: 91 m (299 ft)
- Highest elevation: 404 m (1,325 ft)
- Lowest elevation: 24 m (79 ft)

Population (2024 census)
  - Total: 137,933
  - Density: 1,068.4/km^{2} (2,767.2/sq mi)
  - Households: 36,690
- Demonym: Candelariahin

Economy
  - Income class: 1st municipal income class
  - Poverty incidence: 4.56% (2023)
  - Revenue: ₱ 527.7 million (2024)
  - Assets: ₱ 1,655 million (2024)
  - Expenditure: ₱ 213.7 million (2024)
  - Liabilities: ₱ 213.8 million (2024)

Service provider
  - Electricity: Manila Electric Company (Meralco)
- Time zone: UTC+8 (PST)
- ZIP code: 4323
- PSGC: 0405608000
- IDD : area code: +63 (0)42
- Native languages: Tagalog
- Website: www.candelaria.gov.ph

Candelaria, officially the Municipality of Candelaria (Tagalog: Bayan ng Candelaria), is a municipality in the province of Quezon, Philippines. According to the 2024 census, it has a population of 137,933 people.

It is the third most populous settlement of Quezon after Lucena and Sariaya. Among the municipalities in Quezon Province, Candelaria has the most desiccated coconut factories and oil refineries, such as Peter Paul Philippine Corporation, Primex Coco Products Inc., Pacific Royal Basic Foods, SuperStar Corporation, Tongsan Industrial Development Corporation, and others, which employ thousands of people.

== History ==
=== Foundation ===
Prior to 1885, the pioneering barangays of Candelaria in its western part, Taguan (Bukal), Kinatihan and Masin were parts of the Municipality of Tiaong, while Malabanban, Mangilag and Santa Catalina in the east, were under the jurisdiction of the town of Sariaya. Don Ciriaco Nadres, a local leader of Barangay Masin and his wife Sra. Doña Baltazara Bustamante, with the support of Don Simeon Nadres and wife Doña Everista Ona, Don Justo Argao, Don Elino de Gala, Don Apolinario Gonzales, Don Tomas Cabuñag, Don Ignacio de Ramos, Don Domingo de Alday, Don Tomas Regidor, Don Juan del Valle, Don Ambrocio Salazar, Don Buenaventura Cedeño and Don Hipolito Martinez, proposed the establishment of an independent government over these barangays. They became known as the founding families of the town.

It was on December 26, 1878, that a permit was granted by the Governor-General of the Philippine Islands, Domingo Moriones y Murillo for the establishment of an independent government over these barangays. Its boundaries were fixed by means of a treaty signed by the notable leaders of Tiaong, Sariaya and the founding families of Candelaria.

King Alfonso XII of Spain finally approved the establishment of Candelaria as an independent town on August 5, 1879.

=== American Era and Japanese Occupation ===
In 1902, after the cessation of the general hostilities against the Americans, Candelaria was merged with the neighboring town of Sariaya. In 1907, Candelaria was again managed independently, as a fourth-class municipality. During the American regime, the town progressed by leaps and bounds. Many houses and public edifices were constructed, and commerce and industries grew, until the Japanese invasion brought a further wave of destruction.

== Geography ==
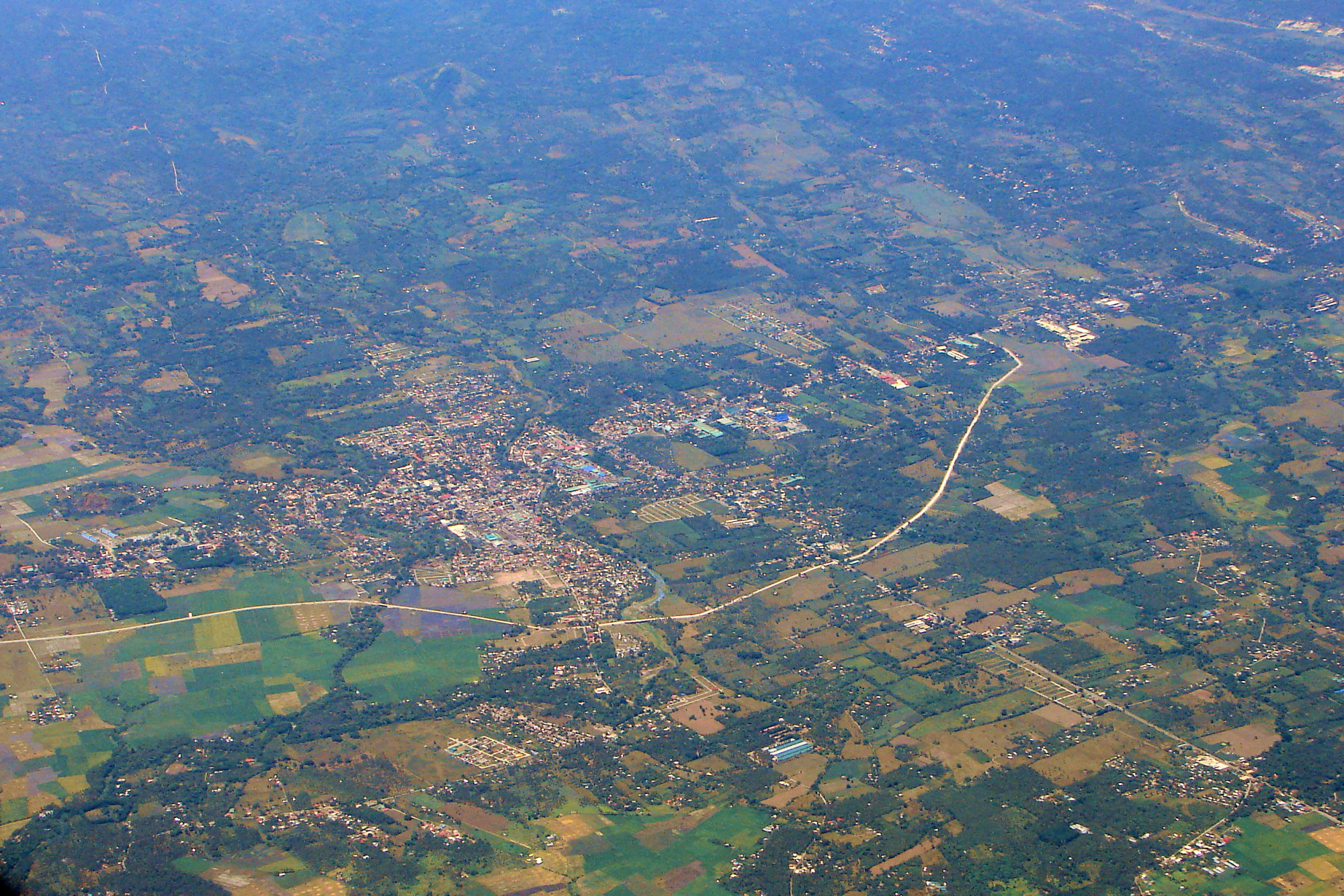
Aerial view of Candelaria (2012)

Candelaria lies at the western part of the province, 108 kilometres (67 mi) from the nation's capital Manila, 22 kilometres (14 mi) from the provincial capital Lucena, and 61 kilometres (38 mi) from Batangas City. To its northern part lies the famous Mount Banahaw, to the east is Sariaya, to the south is San Juan, and to the west are Dolores and Tiaong. The neighboring cities are Lucena, Tayabas, San Pablo and Lipa. It is traversed by the Pan Philippine Highway and the Philippine National Railways.

Candelaria has an area of about 12,910 hectares (31,900 acres) and is an agricultural municipality, situated in the southern part of Mount Banahaw. The town proper is wedged by two rivers, namely, Masin and Quiapo rivers.

=== Barangays ===
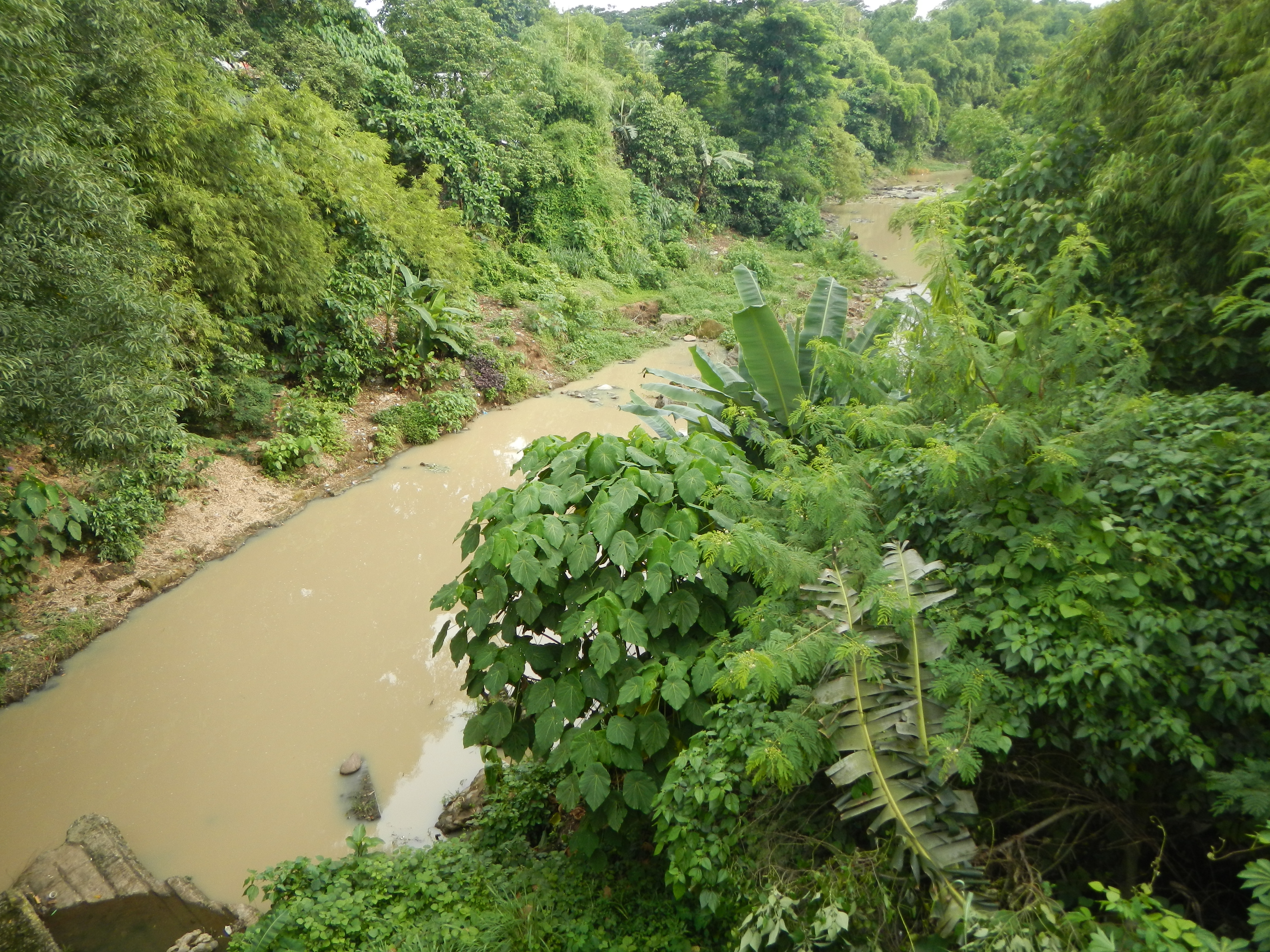
Taguan River (bridge)

Candelaria is politically subdivided into 25 barangays, as indicated in the matrix below. Each barangay consists of puroks and some have sitios.

Barangay	Barangay Captain (2025)	Population (2024)
Buenavista East	Dionisio G. Aguila	2,582
Buenavista West	Cepriano B. Delos Reyes	3,712
Bukal Norte	William M. Navaliza	3,059
Bukal Sur	Gauden M. Cornejo	8,577
Kinatihan I	Buenaventura M. Reyes	1,884
Kinatihan II	Redentor B. Hernandez	1,878
Malabanban Norte	Conversion M. Lamoca	12,538
Malabanban Sur	Perfecto C. Alcantara	9,684
Mangilag Norte	Alfonso A. Semira	3,498
Mangilag Sur	Benedicto M. Alcantara	8,786
Masalukot I	Abel T. Caguitla	7,060
Masalukot II	Ronilo G. Maligaya	3,172
Masalukot III	Eugenia Laino	1,528
Masalukot IV	Alberto M. Donadio	831
Masalukot V	Roseller D. Belen	783
Masin Norte	Nelson H. Punzalan	7,602
Masin Sur	Reynaldo L. Cantos	6,213
Mayabobo	Rufino C. Delgado	2,677
Pahinga Norte	Manuel S. Ebora	17,425
Pahinga Sur	Teodoro C. Mendoza	3,192
Poblacion	Reynante N. Rasay	4,862
San Andres	Librado M. Panaligan	5,152
San Isidro	Ailene B. Panganiban	5,835
Santa Catalina Norte	Peter S. Malaluan	7,161
Santa Catalina Sur	Manolito D. Maniebo	8,242

=== Climate ===
Climate data for Candelaria, Quezon
Month	Jan	Feb	Mar	Apr	May	Jun	Jul	Aug	Sep	Oct	Nov	Dec	Year
Mean daily maximum °C (°F)	28 (82)	28 (82)	30 (86)	32 (90)	32 (90)	32 (90)	31 (88)	31 (88)	31 (88)	30 (86)	29 (84)	28 (82)	30 (86)
Mean daily minimum °C (°F)	22 (72)	22 (72)	23 (73)	24 (75)	24 (75)	24 (75)	24 (75)	24 (75)	23 (73)	23 (73)	23 (73)	23 (73)	23 (74)
Average precipitation mm (inches)	146.2 (5.76)	118.9 (4.68)	89.1 (3.51)	75.6 (2.98)	170.8 (6.72)	188.7 (7.43)	258.9 (10.19)	193.3 (7.61)	227.3 (8.95)	373.7 (14.71)	425.3 (16.74)	483.6 (19.04)	2,751.4 (108.32)
Average rainy days	22	16	14	10	16	18	20	20	21	24	26	26	233
Source: World Weather Online (Use with caution: this is modeled/calculated data, not measured locally.)

There are two pronounced seasons in Candelaria: Dry and hot season from March to May, Wet season from June to December. Typhoons struck the municipality every three to five years. The most remarkable are Supertyphoon Angela (Rosing) in 1995, Typhoon Xangsane (Milenyo) in 2006, and Typhoon Rammasun (Glenda) in 2014.

Normal temperatures in Candelaria range from 20 °C (68 °F) to 32 °C (90 °F). The temperatures became cooler in January with a range of about 18 °C (64 °F), while in April, the hottest month, may rise by up to 36 °C (97 °F).

=== Topography ===
Candelaria is more elevated in the northern part since it lies at the southern slope of Banahaw and is predominantly agricultural. There are plantations of coconut and vegetables in its remote barangays. Most of the inhabitants are having poultry and livestock business and in the remaining part of the municipality are farmlands mostly of rice, corn, and other root crops.

== Demographics ==
Population census of Candelaria
Year	Pop.	±% p.a.
1918	8,210	—
1939	17,686	+3.72%
1948	21,116	+1.99%
1960	29,928	+2.95%
1970	44,031	+3.93%
1975	49,384	+2.33%
1980	54,629	+2.04%
1990	69,969	+2.51%
1995	80,733	+2.72%
2000	92,429	+2.94%
2007	105,997	+1.91%
2010	110,570	+1.55%
2015	117,434	+1.15%
2020	137,881	+3.44%
2024	137,933	+0.01%
Source: Philippine Statistics Authority

Candelaria has a population of 137,933 as of the 2024 census. The increase in population became rapid in the 1990s due to a major economic boom, in 1995, it has a population of 80,733 inhabitants, while in 2000, the population grew to 92,429, with an increase of about 15 percent.

In 2007, the official number of inhabitants in the municipality based on 2007 census is 105,997, or about 4,240 families or 21,243 households. Most Candelariahins reside in Pahinga Norte and Malabanban Norte, the adjacent barangays of the town proper.

As of 2007, almost 93 percent of the population are mostly Roman Catholics, 3.5 percent are Protestants, about 3 percent are members of Iglesia ni Cristo, 0.05 percent are of Islam, 0.97 percent are of other denominations such as Church of Christ/Christian Churches, Pentecostals, Baptists, Latter Day Saints, Seventh-day Adventist, Jehovah's Witnesses and others.

=== Language ===
Tagalog is widely spoken by the populace. However, their accent resembles the Tagalog dialect spoken in Batangas owing to its location, and history. Most of the residents came from the neighboring province of Batangas. This is likely due to the fact that most candelariahins actually lived in other places such as lipa, before moving to candelaria.

== Economy ==
Poverty incidence of Candelaria (%)

Source: Philippine Statistics Authority

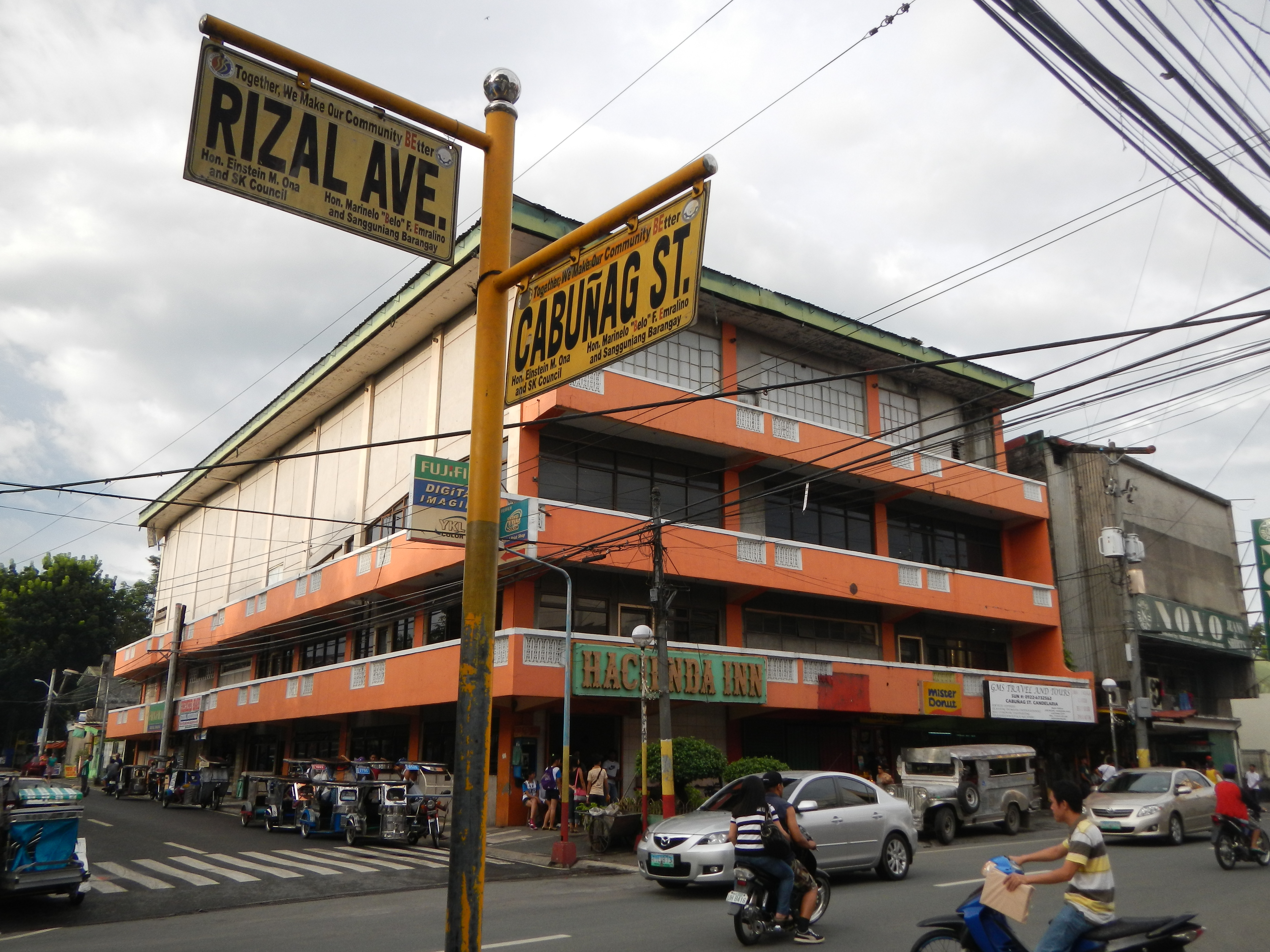
Busy downtown, Hacienda Inn

Candelaria is one of the most progressive municipalities in Quezon Province. Rapid progress have been felt since the 1990s where most of the commercial establishments have been built such as retail merchandising, supermarkets, hardware, fastfood outlets or restaurants, shopping mall, and others. The Candelaria Public Market, though it is adjacent to Barangay Poblacion, is located on Barangay Pahinga Norte.

In 2024, there is a total inventory of 812 registered establishments. Most are in retail trade, wholesale, and real estate leasing.

In agriculture, coconut is the most dominant crop of the municipality covering 5,243.50 hectares or 30% of the town's land area. In terms of livestock production, many locals raised poultry by 73.30% from the overall animal population.

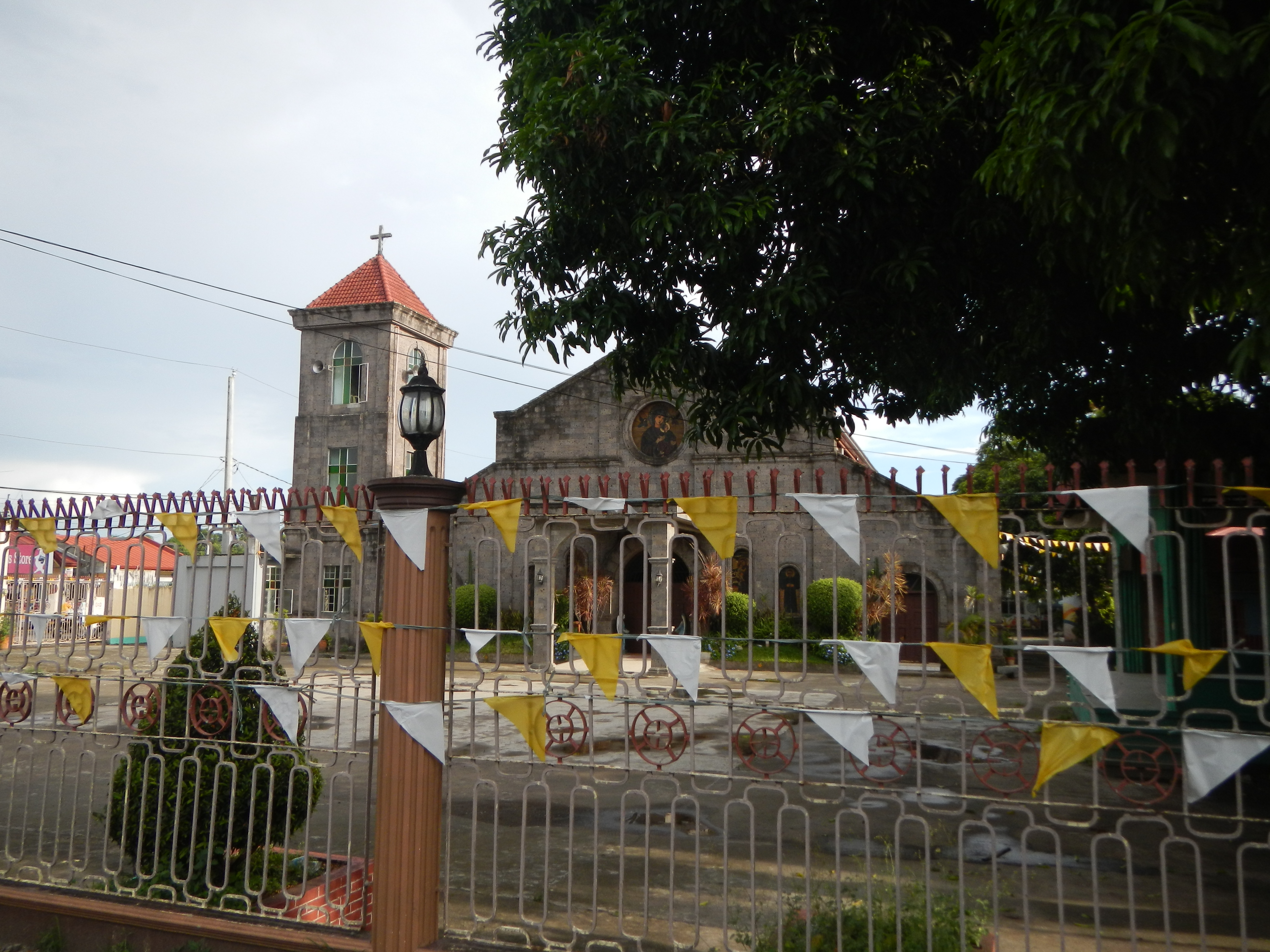
Our Mother of Perpetual Help Parish Church of Taguan

== Culture ==
=== Candle Festival ===
The town fiesta is celebrated on February 5 to honor the patron saint of Candelaria, San Pedro Bautista. Since 2017, Rev. Msgr. Melecio Verastigue, started a dance to honor San Pedro Bautista, which is now known as Indak Pugay.

Since 2005, Msgr. Carlos "Charles" Pedro A. Herrera, the parish priest of the San Pedro Bautista Parish, started his devotion to Nuestra Senora de Candelaria and honored her with a Candle Festival every February 2. The celebration was concluded with a procession through the streets of the town featuring the street dancing by the youth of the community in honor of the Blessed Virgin. A parade of floats representing each of the 25 barangays was, also, featured during the festivities.

A project in honor of the Blessed Mother Mary that will renovate the patio of the San Pedro Bautista Parish Church had been developed on April 22, 2012. The renovated patio will convert the current parking lot into a multi-purpose open amphitheater for use of the people of Candelaria. It will provide a venue for children and toddlers playground, jogging/walking path, a rosary garden, a via Dolorosa, and a stage for performances complete with controlled theater lighting. The playground will be lit with lighting standards. The fundraising for the project will be accomplished through a 1000 Points of Light campaign.

== Government ==
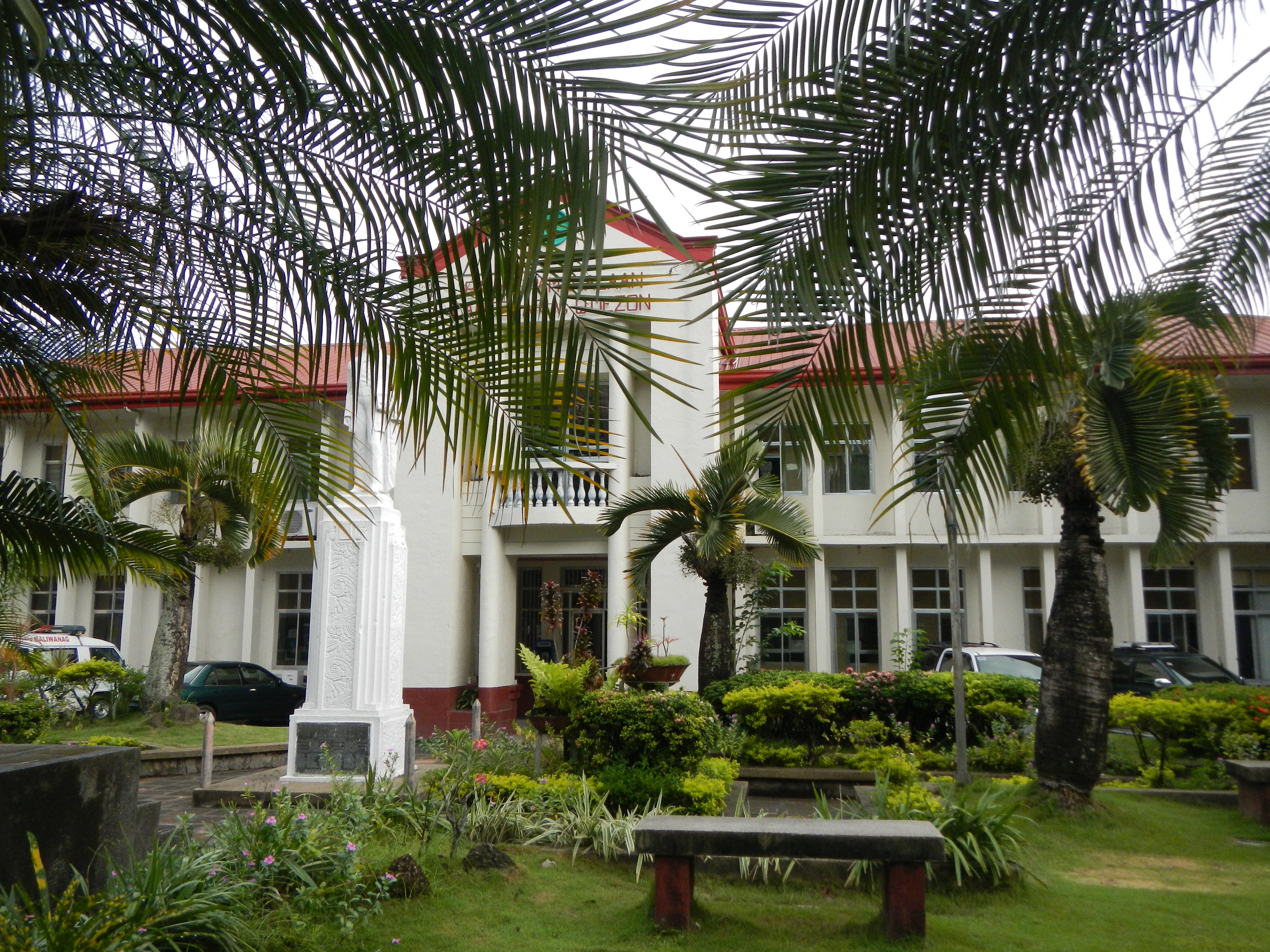
Town hall

=== Elected officials ===
Municipal council (2025-2028):

- Mayor: George D. Suayan
- Vice Mayor: Ireneo C. Boongaling
- Councilors:
  - Davielyn A. Alcala
  - Aileen M. Dellosa
  - Estelito A. Sulit
  - Joy Anne M. Pasumbal
  - Numeriano S. Briones
  - Anatalia R. Atienza
  - Manuel Antonio V. De Luna
  - Ma. Lourdes Bernadette G. Liwanag
- ABC President: Manuel S. Ebora
- SK Federation President: Ann Ivy Nicole B. Cuadro

=== Former heads and mayors (1879–2022) ===
- Don Simeon Nadres, 1879–1883
- Don Clemente Nadres, 1883–1887
- Don Tomas Cabunag, 1887–1891
- Don Apolinario Gonzales, 1891–1895
- Don Pedro de Gala, 1895–1898
- Don Benigno Nadres, 1898–1900
- Don Elino de Gala, 1900–1902
- Don Herminigildo Nadres, 1908–1912, 1919–1921
- Don Juan Javier, 1912–1916
- Don Generoso de Gala, 1916–1918
- Don Gregorio Remata, 1918–1919
- Don Francisco Fernandez, 1921–1922
- Don Mansueto Javier, 1922–1925
- Don David Reyroso, 1925–1928
- Don Emilio de Gala, 1928–1931
- Dr. Generoso Nadres Sr., 1931–1934
- Dr. Vicente Macasaet, 1934–1937
- Pastor Javier, 1937–1941, 1943–1944, 1945–1946
- Juan Ramos, 1941
- Francisco Malabanan, 1941–1943
- Cresenciano de Gala, 1944–1945
- Felix Ona, 1946–1947, 1955–1959
- Eligio Manalo, 1947–1955
- Venancio Dia, 1959–1967
- Atty. Cipriano Maliwanag, 1967–1978
- Pedro Cedeno, 1978–1986
- David Emralino, 1986–1998, 2001–2007
- Isidro de Gala, 1998–2001
- Atty. Ferdinand Maliwanag, 1998, 2007–2016
- Macario Boongaling, 2016-2022

== Infrastructure ==
=== Transportation ===
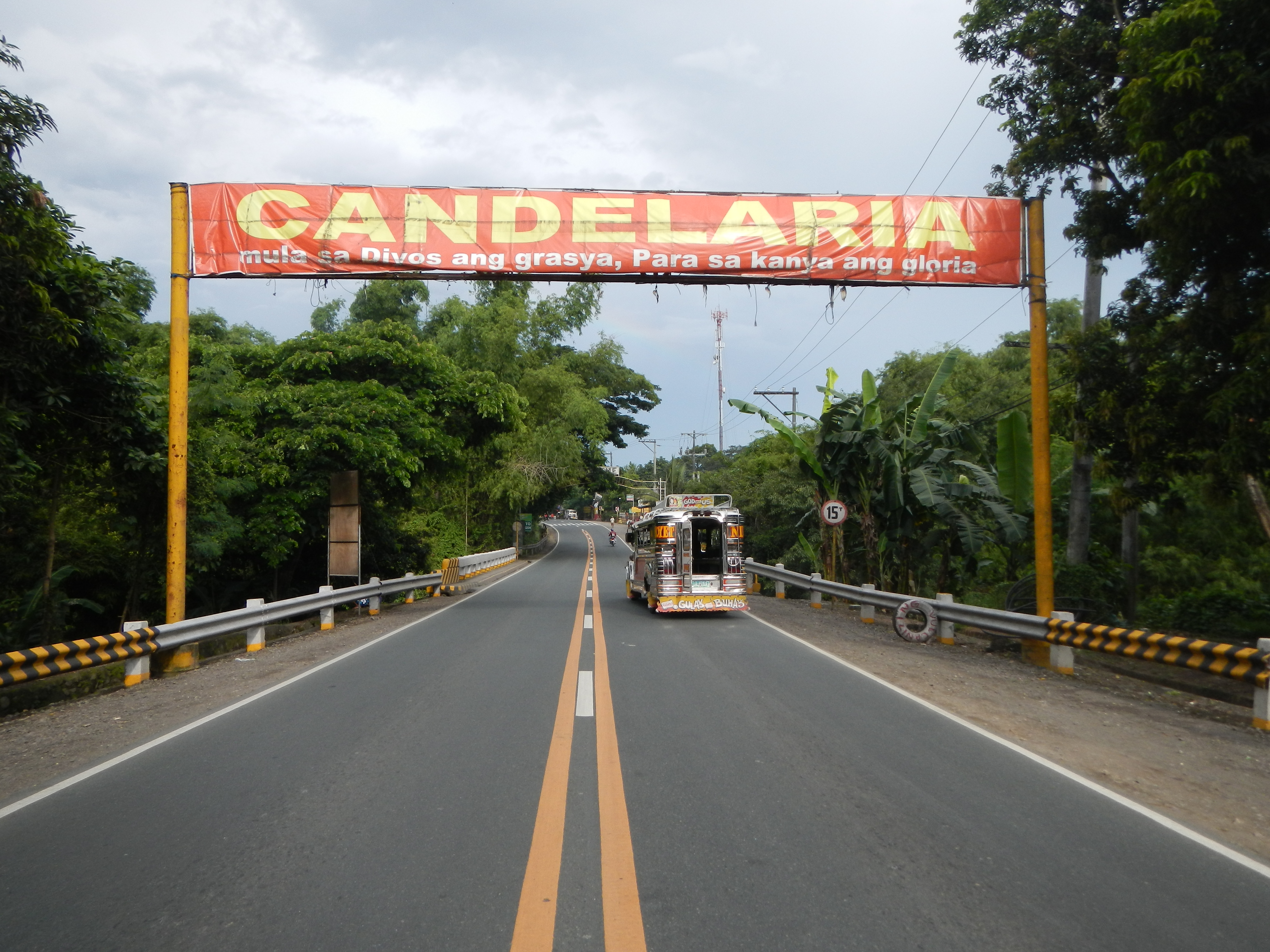
Welcome arch

==== Road network ====
Three major highways pass through the municipality and the town proper. The South Luzon Expressway Toll Road 4 (TR4) stretching from Santo Tomas, Batangas to Lucena will pass through the northern part of the municipality, planned to be finished in 2028. The new expressway will occupy portions of Barangays Bukal Norte, Masalukot II, Masalukot I, Mayabobo, and Mangilag Norte.

- The Pan-Philippine Highway (also known as Maharlika Highway or National Highway), passes through the municipality west–east from Barangay Bukal Sur to Barangay Mangilag Sur. It connects the municipality to its neighboring towns of Tiaong and Sariaya and cities like San Pablo in Laguna and Lucena, the provincial capital.
  - Rizal Street is the two-lane main road and a segment of the Pan-Philippine Highway in Barangay Poblacion. It connects Barangay Masin Norte and Sur in the west and Malabanban Norte in the east. Some landmarks located here are the Municipal Hall, the Catholic Church, and Plaza Narra.
- The Candelaria–San Juan Road (also known as Candelaria-Bolboc Road) is a 16 kilometres (9.9 mi) two-lane highway that starts at the Pan Philippine Highway junction in Barangay Malabanban Norte, going straight south to the municipality of San Juan, Batangas. This is an alternative road for commuters from Metro Manila via Batangas.
- The Candelaria Bypass Road (also known as Candelaria Diversion Road) is a two-lane bypass road that serves as an alternative road for commuters from Metro Manila to Batangas and the Bicol Region. Opened in 2012, this 7.8 kilometres (4.8 mi) road bypasses Poblacion.

There are also major roads within the municipality.

- Cabunag Street also in Barangay Poblacion is the municipality's main business district. Most of the business establishments, such as hardware stores like Licup Builders, the oldest hardware store in town, RTWs, pharmacies, footwear, general merchandise, and restaurants are located here. It also serves as a thoroughfare for local commuters going to nearby barangays such as Pahinga Norte and Masalukot I.
- Ramos Street-Masalukot Barangay Road is a road that starts at Maharlika Highway in Barangay Poblacion and ends at Barangay Masalukot III. This is also an access road to most of the subdivisions located in Barangay Masalukot I, such as School View Park Subdivision, Village of St. Jude (VSJ), Maria Cristina Village, St. Anthony Subdivision, Villa Macaria Country Homes, Clarisse Subdivision, Faustin Floraville, and others. There are also schools located along the road, such as Grabsum School Inc. and Dr. Panfilo Castro National High School Annex.
- Tibanglan Road is a dirt road that serves as a main access to Barangay Mayabobo from Maharlika Highway in Barangay Malabanban Norte, in front of Iglesia ni Cristo Church.
- Pahinga-Kinatihan Road is a barangay road that starts at Cabunag Street down south to Barangay Kinatihan II. It serves as an access road to Candelaria Bypass Road from the town proper. Some landmarks located along the road are Peter Paul Philippine Corporation, Pahinga Norte Elementary School, Cocoma, and Villa Katrina Subdivision. A junction located in Barangay Pahinga Norte, right after the spillway across Quiapo River, connects it to Barangay Santa Catalina Norte.
- Mangilag-Concepcion Road is a barangay road that starts at Maharlika Highway in Mangilag Sur and an access road to Barangays Mayabobo and Concepcion Banahaw in Sariaya, Quezon. Some landmarks found here are Dr. Panfilo Castro National High School, Mangilag Norte Elementary School, and Mount Mayabobo.

==== Public transport ====
Provincial buses to and from Metro Manila and Lucena City such as JAC Liner Inc., DLTBCo, JAM Liner, Dela Rosa Liner and Lucena Lines stop at the municipality's designated bus stops in Poblacion.

SUPREME, a bus plying Batangas City-Lucena City route and vice versa also passes through Candelaria (Sambat).

There are also jeepney terminals located in the town proper. For passengers going to Lucena City, the terminal is located at the intersection of Rizal Avenue corner Gonzales Street. For passengers going to San Pablo City, the terminal is located at the intersection of Rizal Avenue corner Ona Street. For passengers going to San Juan, Batangas, the terminal is located in Gonzales Street.

Tricycles are the most common mode of transportation in the municipality. There are many tricycle terminals in Barangay Poblacion, serving local commuters to the nearby barangays.

==== Water transport ====
Candelaria has no coastline and is one of the inland municipalities of Quezon, together with Dolores, Lucban, Sampaloc, San Antonio, Tayabas, and Tiaong. The seaport nearest to the municipality is Dalahican Port in Lucena City for passengers going to Marinduque, Masbate, and other island provinces. Dalahican Port is about 30 kilometers (19 mi) from Candelaria. Among the international seaports in Luzon, Batangas Port in Batangas City is the nearest. It would take approximately two hours in a private vehicle to reach from Candelaria, passing through the municipalities of San Juan, Rosario, and Ibaan, Batangas.

==== Air transport ====
Candelaria has no airport, runway or any facility to accommodate air operations. The nearest airbase in the municipality is the San Fernando Airbase in Lipa City with a distance of about 32 kilometers (20 mi) west of the municipality, while the nearest international airport is Ninoy Aquino International Airport in Metro Manila. It is formerly served by the Lucena Airport in Lucena that has been closed. For air travelers, you have to travel for more or less two hours to reach Metro Manila and a couple of minutes more for Ninoy Aquino International Airport in case of traffic obstructions.

=== Communications ===
Candelaria is served by General Telephone System, Inc. (GTSi) and Digitel Telecommunications (PLDT-Digitel) as the main telecommunication services providers. GTSi has started its operations in the municipality in 1981, making it the third municipality where it started its operation, the first two are Gumaca in 1977 and Atimonan in 1979.

Internet shops are commonly found in the town proper.

== Healthcare ==
Candelaria has three hospitals: one public and two private.

- Candelaria Municipal Hospital (known as Nursery, built in 1984) - located in Barangay Masin Norte, near the barangay hall of masin norte.
- Peter Paul Medical Center (formerly Peter Paul Hospital, built in 1948) - located in Regidor St., Barangay Poblacion.
- United Candelaria Doctors Hospital (built in 2007) - located in Maharlika Highway near Candelaria Bypass Road, Barangay Mangilag Sur.

The Candelaria Municipal Hospital is built during the administration of then Mayor Pedro Cedeno in 1984. Peter Paul Medical Center is one of the pioneering hospitals of the municipality, established in 1948. United Candelaria Doctors Hospital is the newly built medical facility of Candelaria, opened in February 2009.

Each barangay has its own health center for free health services. More lying-in clinics are located throughout the municipality.

== Education ==
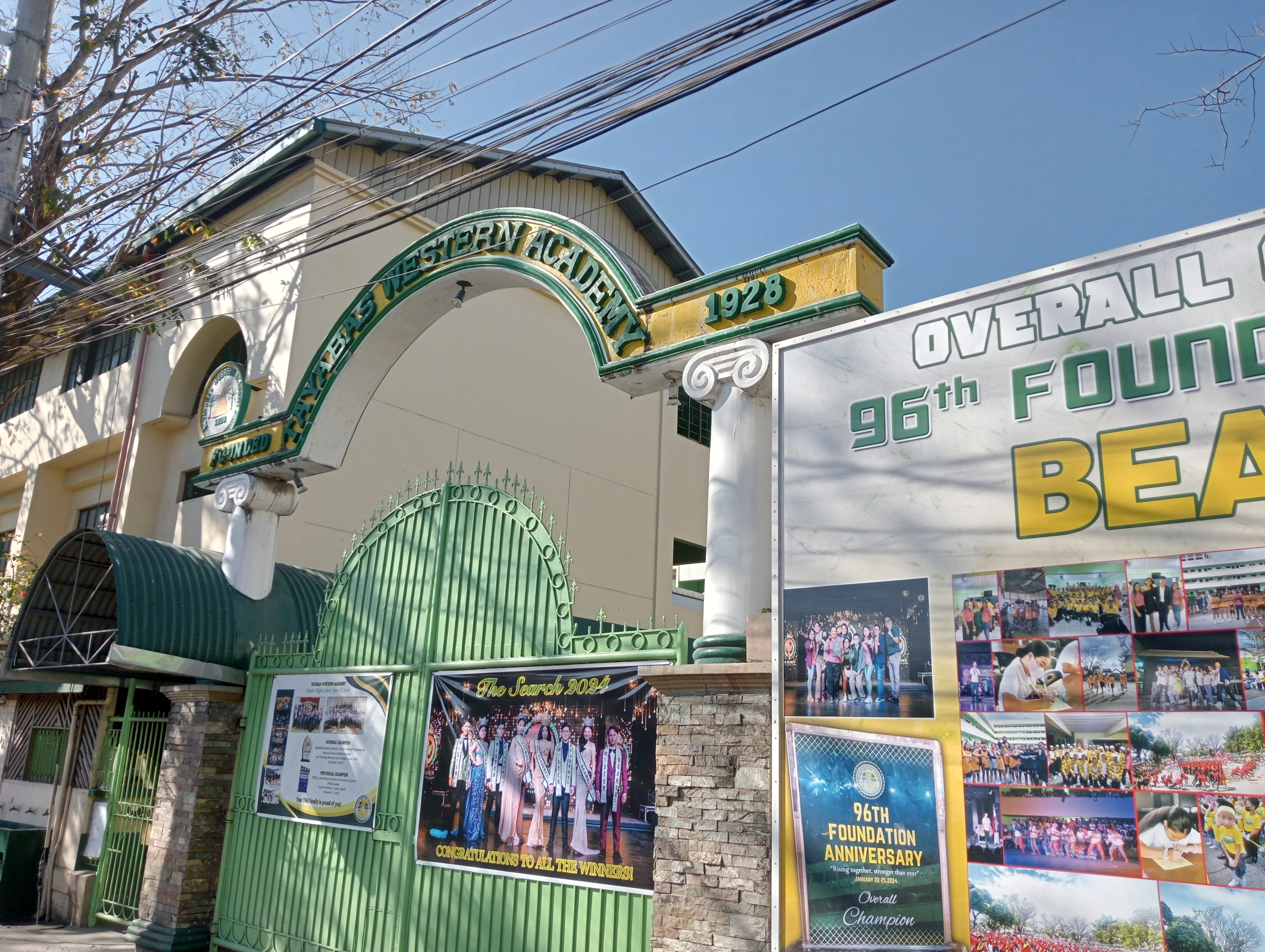
Tayabas Western Academy

There are two schools district offices which govern all educational institutions within the municipality. They oversee the management and operations of all private and public, from primary to secondary schools. These are the Candelaria East Schools District Office, and Candelaria West Schools District Office.

=== Primary and elementary schools ===
- Brentley Montessori School
- Brisbane Integrated School
- Buenavista East Elementary School
- Buenavista West Elementary School
- Bukal Norte Elementary School
- Bukal Norte Elementary School (Mayapyap Annex)
- Bukal Sur Elementary School
- Candelaria Elementary School (Main)
- Candelaria Elementary School (Annexes 1)
- Candelaria Elementary School (Annexes 2)
- GRABSUM School (School View)
- Headstart Christian Learning Institute
- Kinatihan I Elementary School
- Kinatihan II Elementary School
- Manuel Luis Quezon Elementary School (Cheng Hua Chinese School)
- Manuel S. Enverga University Foundation
- Malabanban Norte Elementary School
- Malabanban Sur Elementary School
- Mangilag Norte Elementary School
- Mangilag Sur Elementary School
- Masalukot I Elementary School
- Masalukot II Elementary School
- Masalukot III Elementary School
- Masalukot IV Elementary School
- Masalukot V Elementary School
- Masin Elementary School
- Mayabobo Elementary School
- Newton Science School
- Pahinga Norte Elementary School
- Pahinga Sur Elementary School
- San Andres Elementary School
- San Isidro Elementary School
- Santa Catalina Norte Elementary School
- Santa Catalina Central School
- Southeast Asian Comprehensive Montessori School (SEACOMS)
- Tayabas Western Academy
- The Lady Mediatrix Institute
- Trinity Christian Academy
- United Evangelical School

=== Secondary schools ===
- Atty. Celso M. Reyes Integrated National High School
- Bukal Sur National High School
- Dolores Macasaet National High School
- Dr. Panfilo Castro National High School
- GRABSUM School
- Manuel S. Enverga University (Junior and Senior High School)
- Newton Science School
- Santa Catalina National High School
- The Lady Mediatrix Institute
- Tayabas Western Academy (Junior and Senior Highschool)

=== Tertiary ===
- GRABSUM School
- Compskill Learning Academy
- Chrisville Institute of Technology
- Manuel S. Enverga University Foundation
- Tayabas Western Academy

== Notable personalities ==
- Raimund Marasigan, rock musician of the band Eraserheads, Pedicab, Sandwich, Cambio, Project 1, Squid 9, and Gaijin
- Ahtisa Manalo, Miss Universe Philippines 2025 and Miss International 2018 1st Runner-Up
- Rio Locsin, actress
- Cirilo Rigos, Member of the 1986 Constitutional Commission and pastor
