= De La Rose =

De La Rose or De la Rose may refer to:

- De La Rose (horse) (1978–2001), an American Thoroughbred racehorse
  - De La Rose Stakes, an American Thoroughbred horse race
- De la Rose (surname), including a list of people with the name
- De La Rose (singer) (Yuberkis Gabriela Marie de la Rosa Bryan, born 2001), Puerto Rican singer and songwriter
