= Dela Rosa Transit =

Bus company in the Philippines

Dela Rosa Transit Dela Rosa Express N. Dela Rosa Liner
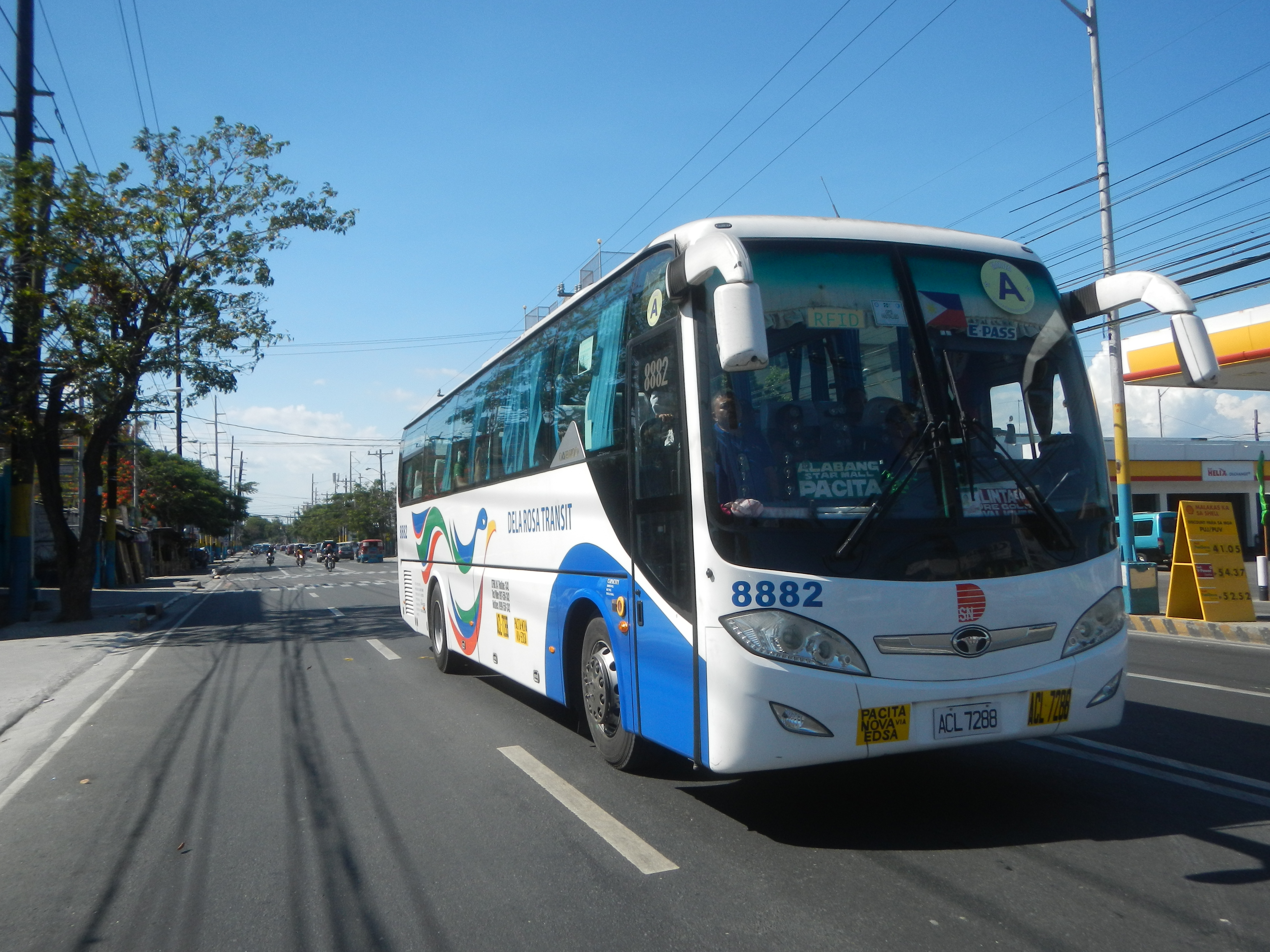
- Founded: October 7, 1991; 35 years ago
- Headquarters: Sto. Domingo, Biñan, Laguna
- Service area: Metro Manila & Southern Luzon, Philippines
- Service type: City & Provincial Operation
- Depots: Novaliches, Quezon City
- Fleet: 300+ Buses (UD Nissan Diesel, Hino & King Long) (including those from N. Dela Rosa Liner)
- Operator: Rosauro dela Rosa/Dela Rosa Transit/N. Dela Rosa Liner

Dela Rosa Transit is one of the city bus companies in the Philippines. It plies route from Pacita Complex, San Pedro, Laguna to Novaliches, Quezon City. It also offers provincial routes operated under its sister companies, Dela Rosa Express and N. Dela Rosa Liner, plying routes from Metro Manila to Batangas City, Batangas, and Lucena City, Quezon, respectively.

The company was named after its sole founder's wife, Nora dela Rosa, who is also an owner of provincial bus company, N. Dela Rosa Liner.

== Suspension of operations ==
On February 5, 2015, A Dela Rosa Transit bus with license plate TYM-449 rammed and crushed a silver 2015 Toyota Vios before sandwiching it against another bus on EDSA in the Muñoz district of Quezon City. The driver of the Vios was trapped for a few minutes, but was later extricated by the MMDA and rushed to the hospital. Following the accident, the Land Transportation Franchising Regulatory Board (LTFRB) ordered the preventive suspension of Dela Rosa Transit and ordered all of the company's drivers to undergo drug testing and road safety seminars within 15 days of the announcement. The bus driver involved in the accident fled the scene, but was later arrested and placed under police custody. Despite his claims that the brakes on the bus failed, he has been charged with reckless imprudence resulting in multiple injuries and damage to property. The driver has since been fired by Dela Rosa Transit.

== Fleet ==
Dela Rosa Transit maintains and utilizes UD Nissan Diesel, Golden Dragon, Guilin Daewoo, Hino, Hyundai Aero Queen, Hyundai Universe Space Luxury, and King Long units, with roughly a total number of 300 buses, including those from N. Dela Rosa Liner.

== Routes ==
- Dela Rosa Transit – Pacita Complex - Lawton (Route 48) and Ayala - Balibago (Route 11)
- Dela Rosa Express – Lawton/Alabang – Lucena City via Santa Rosa Integrated Terminal/Turbina
- N Dela Rosa Liner – Alabang – Batangas City Pier/Grand Terminal via Sta Rosa Integrated Terminal/ACTEX/Calabarzon/Lipa-Tambo Exit
- N Dela Rosa Liner (Premium P2P) – Starmall Alabang – Robinsons Place Manila via SLEX(Southbound)/ Skyway(Northbound)

== Destinations ==
- Metro Manila
  - Alabang, Muntinlupa
  - Ermita, Plaza Lawton, Manila
- Provincial Destinations
  - Lucena City, Quezon
  - Tiaong, Quezon
  - Sariaya, Quezon
  - Candelaria, Quezon
  - Alaminos, Laguna
  - Biñan, Laguna
  - San Pablo, Laguna
  - San Pedro, Laguna*
  - Santa Rosa, Laguna
  - Turbina, Calamba, Laguna
  - Batangas Port Terminal, Batangas City via ACTEX
  - Santo Tomas, Batangas
  - Tanauan, Batangas
  - Malvar, Batangas
  - San Jose, Batangas
  - Lipa City, Batangas via SM Lipa Grand Terminal/Robinsons Place Lipa

(*)operates as part of Dela Rosa Transit's city operation
