= De la Rue =

De la Rue or De La Rue may refer to:

- De La Rue, an English company
- De la Rue (surname) or Delarue, a list of people with the surname
- De La Rue (crater), a lunar crater
- De La Rue baronets, a title in the Baronetage of the United Kingdom
- Vingtaine de la Rue, a vingtaine (political subdivision) on the Channel Island of Jersey
- Thomas Delarue School, a former school in Tonbridge, Kent
