= José de la Rosa =

Mexican musician

José de la Rosa was a Mexican composer, printer, singer and guitarist who moved to Mexican Alta California in 1833, with the Híjar-Padrés Party, where he became known as Don Pepe. He may have also been the first professional printer in California history.

Rosa was an Alcalde of the Presidio of Sonoma. He played a role in the 1846 Bear Flag rebellion in Sonoma, when he assisted in assuring the release of Mariano Vallejo.

Rosa documented the oldest-known transcriptions of Mexican-Californian Californios song lyrics, in a notebook now archived in the Southwest Museum of the American Indian in Los Angeles.

== See also ==
- Alta California

== Sources ==
- Koskoff, Ellen, ed. (2000). Garland Encyclopedia of World Music, Volume 3: The United States and Canada. Garland Publishing. ISBN 0-8240-4944-6.
