= Raun Larose =

American fashion designer

Raun LaRose (born August 19, 1986) is an American menswear fashion designer based in New York, New York. He has received recognition for his futuristic style and use of progressive fabrics and texture in his work. He attended Fashion Institute of Technology (FIT) majoring in menswear design. Larose later traveled to Paris, France in order to intern with designer, Zac Posen (2010). When he returned to the States, he decided to work on his self-titled brand, "Raun Larose." He returned to Paris in 2012 to attend Paris Fashion Week and was profiled by Gentlemen's Quarterly (GQ), Women's Wear Daily (WWD), as well as other press outlets. Shortly after, he traveled to London, England, where he collaborated with Rankin Studios in a fashion video entitled, "The Dancer" (2012). He was featured in Vogue Italia in the September issue of 2012, in which he was profiled as one of the 190 emerging designers worldwide. His 2015 collection, "Because the Internet," has been received with rave reviews worldwide.

Recently, Raun Larose was sponsored by the CFDA (Council of Fashion Designers of America), where he was given a platform for his first presentation in New York City during New York Fashion Week Men's for his namesake collection, for Fall 2017. His collection, "To Whom It May Concern," was profiled widely. His focus on creating pieces that experiment with proportions and progressive fabrics, all while maintaining the element of practicality, is as he says, "... a cross between artistic references and mainstream consumerism.”
