= La Rose (surname) =

La Rose is a surname. Notable people with the surname include:

- Jean La Rose, Guyanese environmentalist
- John La Rose (1927–2006), Trinidadian/English political and cultural activist
- Natalie La Rose, Dutch–Surinamese singer, songwriter, and dancer

== See also ==
- Larose (surname)
- De la Rose (surname)
