= Urdaneta Cathedral =

Roman Catholic church in Pangasinan, Philippines

- Our Lady of the Immaculate Conception Cathedral
- Immaculate Conception Cathedral
- Parokyang Katedral ng Mahal na Birhen ng Kalinis-linisang Paglilihi (Filipino); Parroquia Catedral de Nuestra Señora de la Inmaculada Concepción (Spanish)
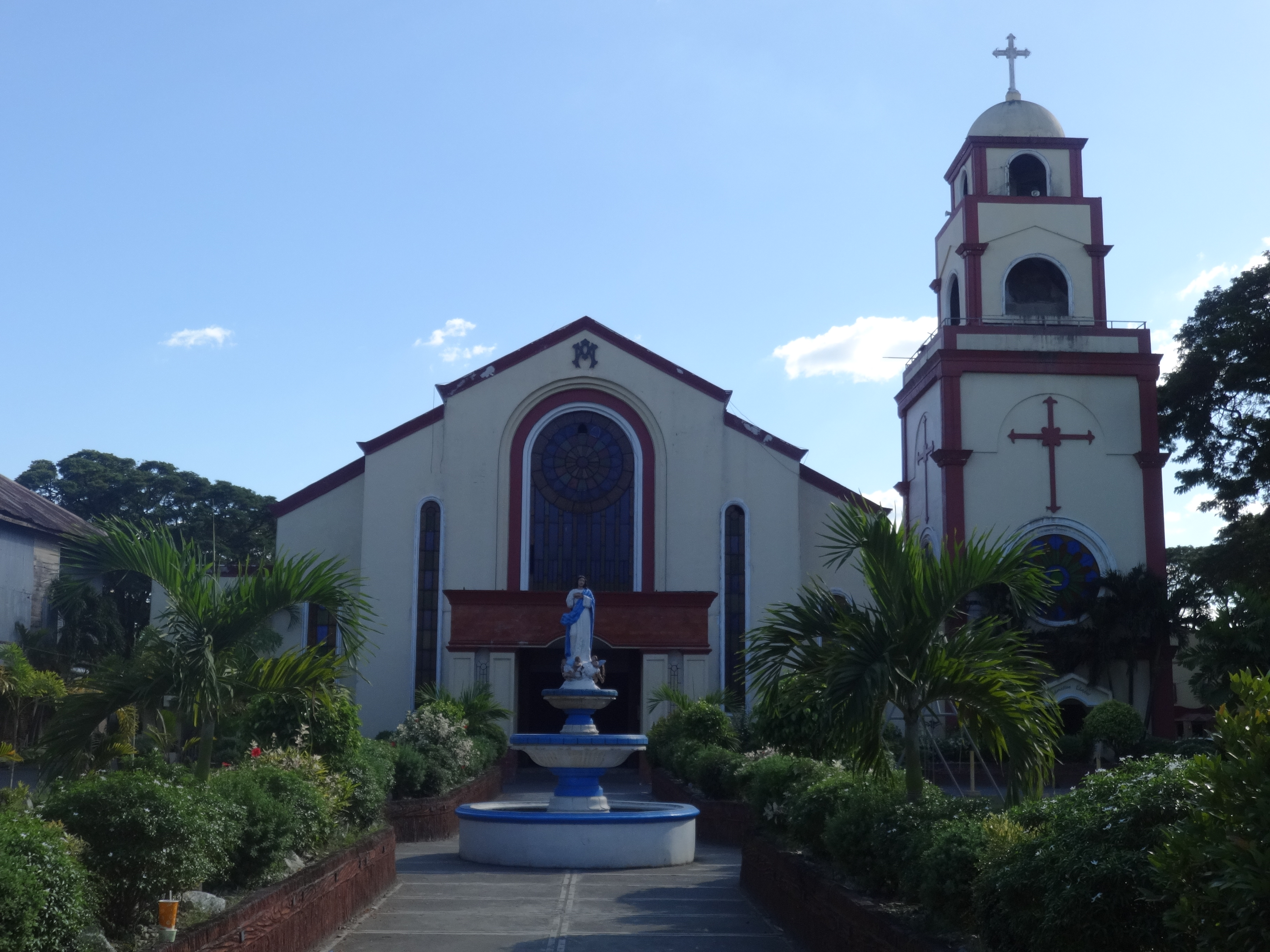
- Cathedral facade in 2018

- Location in Luzon Location in the Philippines
- 15°58′25″N 120°34′02″E
- Location: Urdaneta, Pangasinan
- Country: Philippines
- Denomination: Roman Catholic

History
- Status: Cathedral
- Founded: 1858
- Dedication: Our Lady of the Immaculate Conception

Architecture
- Functional status: Active
- Architectural type: Church building
- Style: Eclectic
- Groundbreaking: 1884

Administration
- Archdiocese: Lingayen-Dagupan
- Diocese: Urdaneta

Clergy
- Bishop: Nick Argel Vaquilar
- Rector: Rev. Fr. Numeriano Gabot, Jr.

Our Lady of the Immaculate Conception Cathedral, commonly known as Urdaneta Cathedral, is a cathedral of the Roman Catholic Church located in the city of Urdaneta, Pangasinan in the Ilocos Region of the Philippines. Situated at Barangay Poblacion of Urdaneta, it is the seat of the Roman Catholic Diocese of Urdaneta and is dedicated to Mary under the title of Our Lady of the Immaculate Conception.

== History ==
Prior to the founding of Urdaneta as a municipality, its present-day Poblacion was initially settled by residents and families from Villasis, Santa Barbara and Manaoag by the close of the 17th century. Migrants from Ilocos and La Union from the north also resettled in the area. By mid-19th century, the continuous population growth prompted the residents to establish a new pueblo (municipality) which comprised parts of Asingan, Binalonan, Malasiqui, Manaoag, Mangaldan, Santa Barbara and Villasis. The new municipality was named Urdaneta and was formally founded in 1858, the same year of establishment of Urdaneta as a visita. Tomas Manzano from Santa served as Urdaneta's first cabeza de barangay while Fr. Nicolas Manrique y Alonzo was tasked to serve as the towns's first pastor. The parish priest of Binalonan served the community of Urdaneta prior to Fr. Manrique's term at the latter.

The visita's first church was a lean-to structure. In 1863, Urdaneta's visita was promoted to a parish by the Dominicans. A stone church was then built but was not finished due to its massive size and the town being relatively young. Aside from being Urdaneta's parish priest, Fr. Manrique also laid plans for the municipality and ordered the transfer of an old camarin which would serve as a house of worship, to the site where the first church of Urdaneta was later built. Fr. Rafael Cano spearheaded the construction of the church on March 4, 1884. On its inauguration, the church was 77.10 metres (253 feet) long and 23.30 metres (76 feet) wide. The three-naved church was damaged by the bombings during World War II.

The Diocese of Urdaneta, along with Alaminos, was canonically erected on January 12, 1985, during the papacy of Pope John Paul II. Urdaneta's Immaculate Conception Church was designated as the diocesan seat of the bishopric.

The reredos or retablo of the cathedral are works of Kapampangan artist Willy Layug, who also worked on the cathedrals of Dagupan, Bacolod, and San Jose in Nueva Ecija.

== Gallery ==
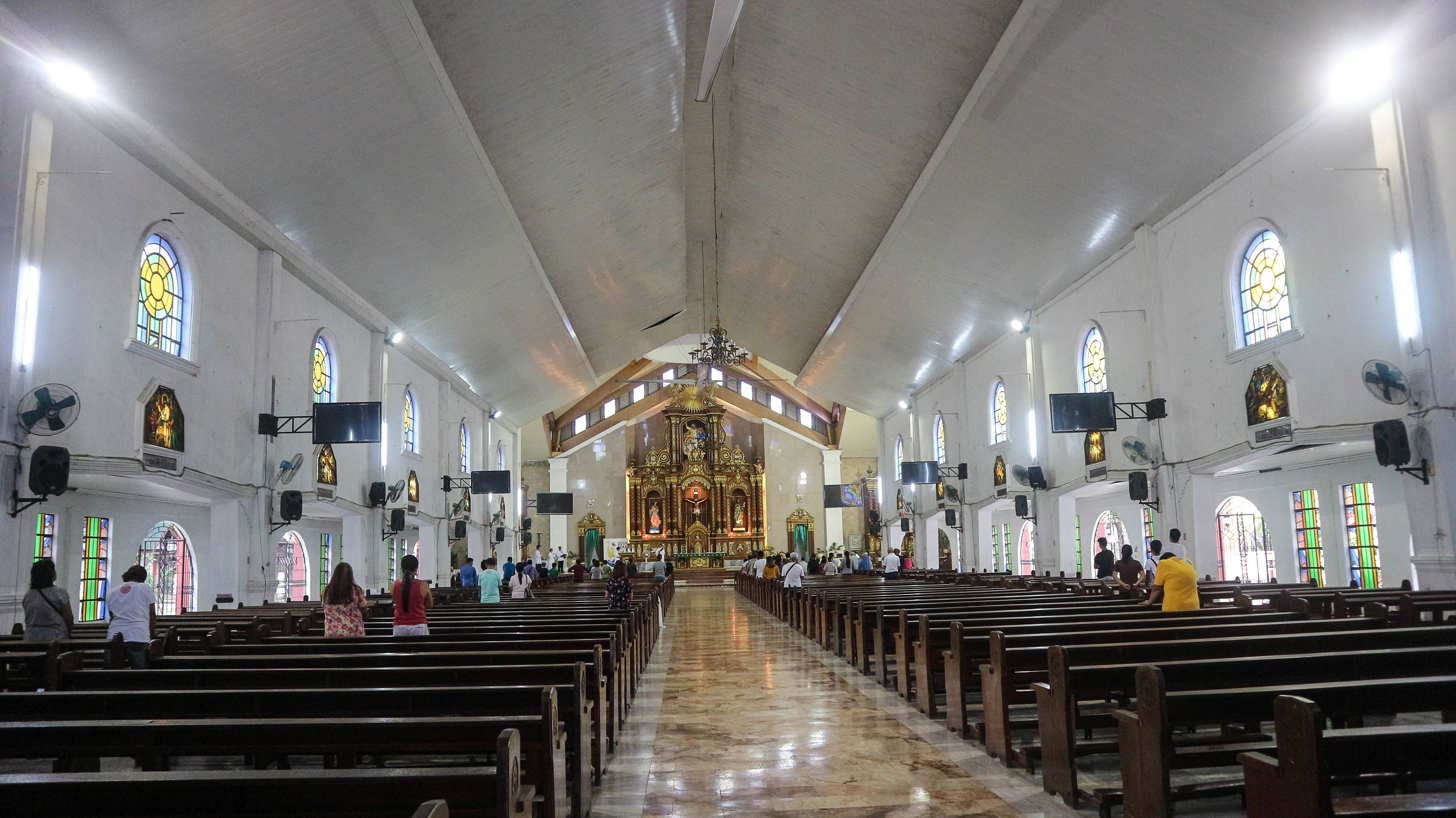
View of the nave towards the sanctuary in 2019

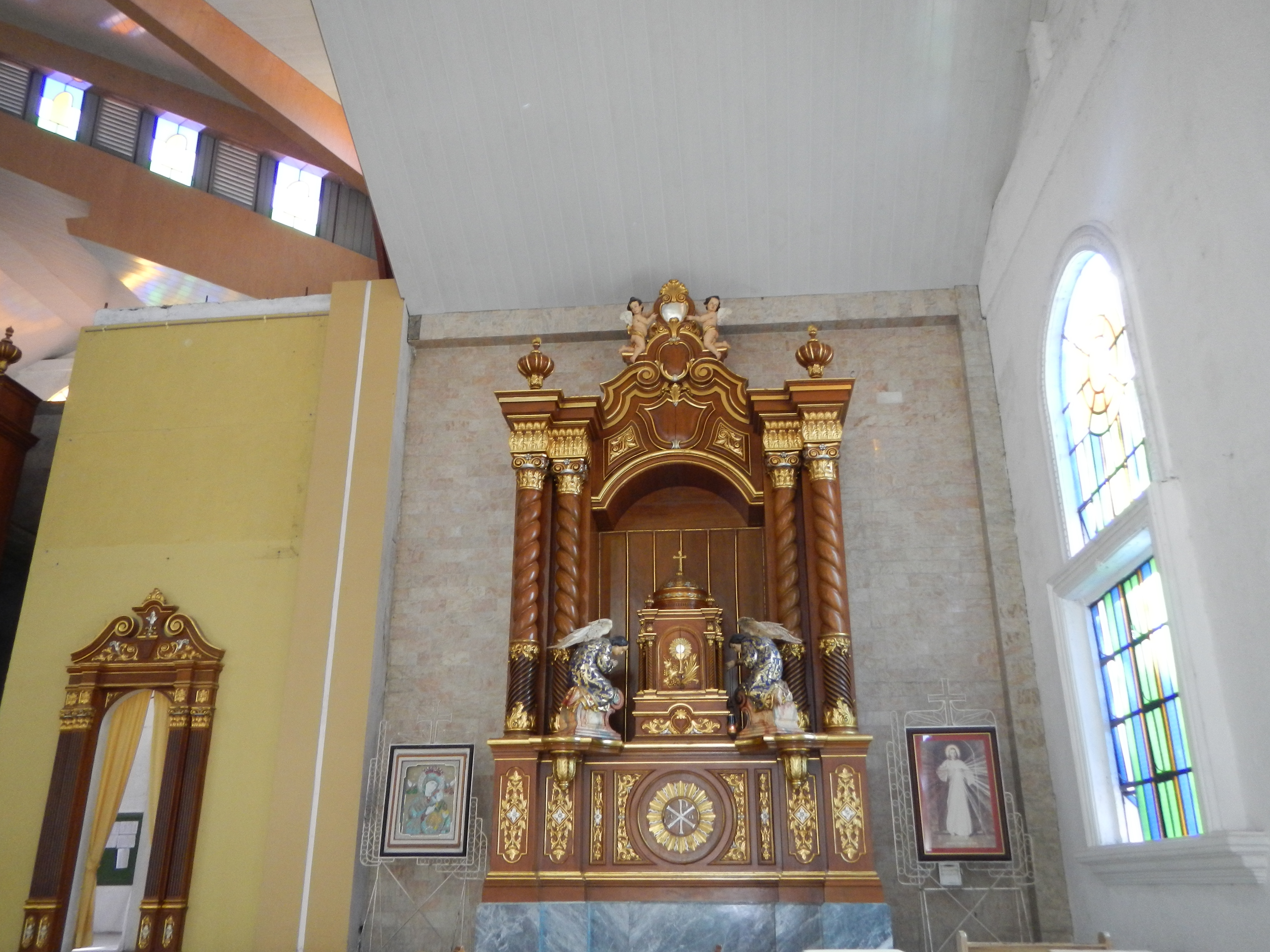
The cathedral's tabernacle at the altar's left side

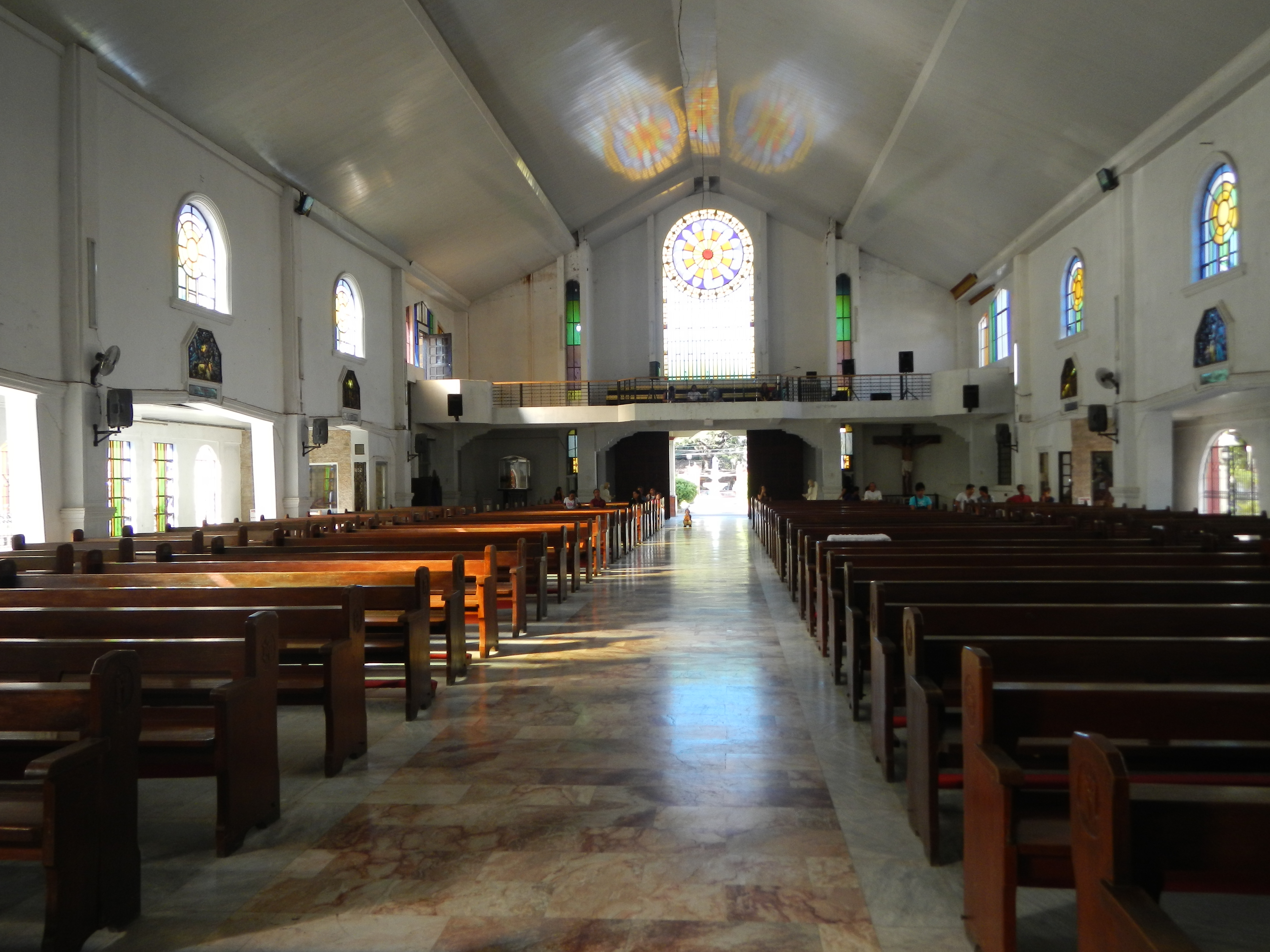
The view of the nave towards the narthex

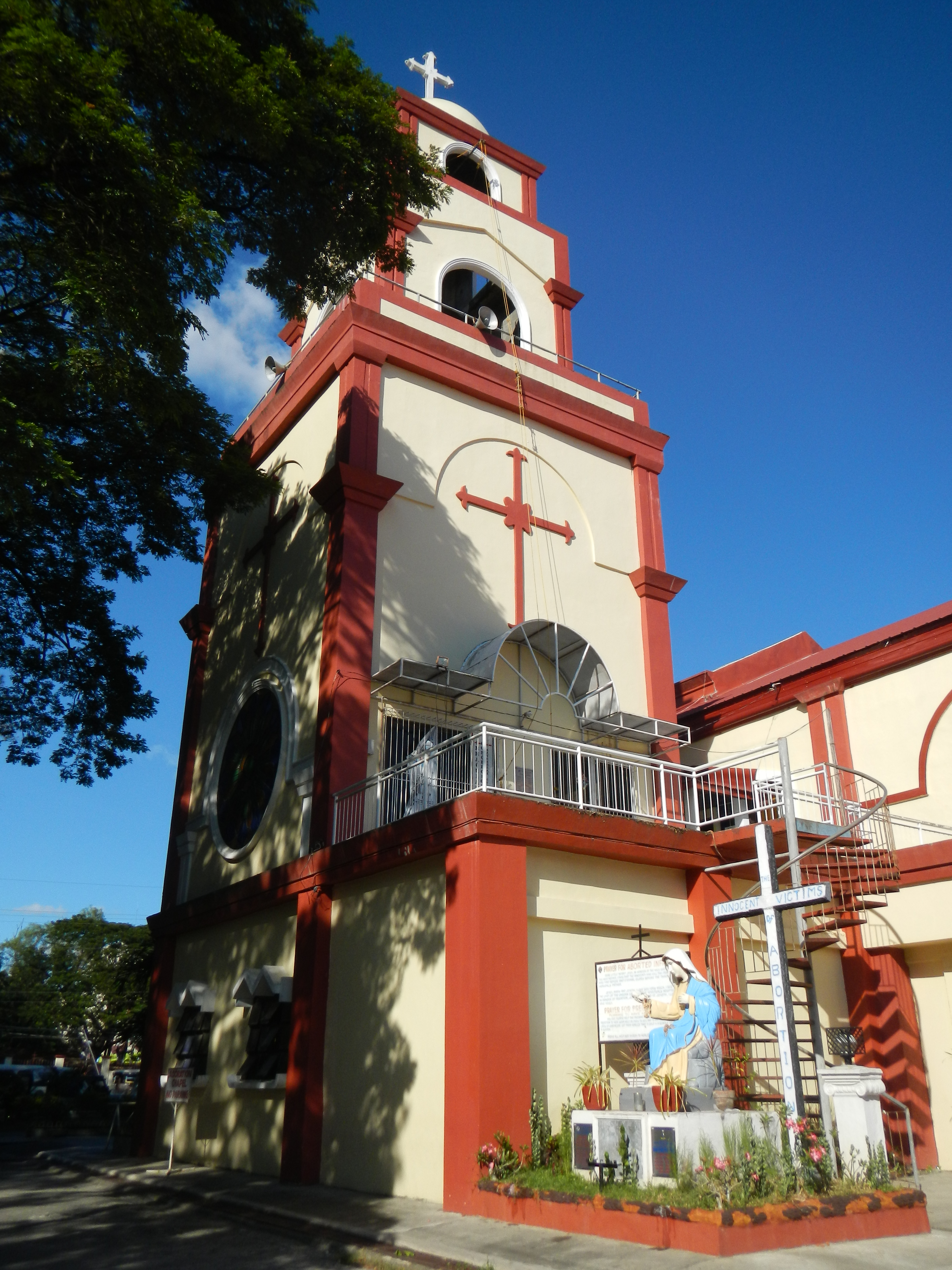
Cathedral bell tower

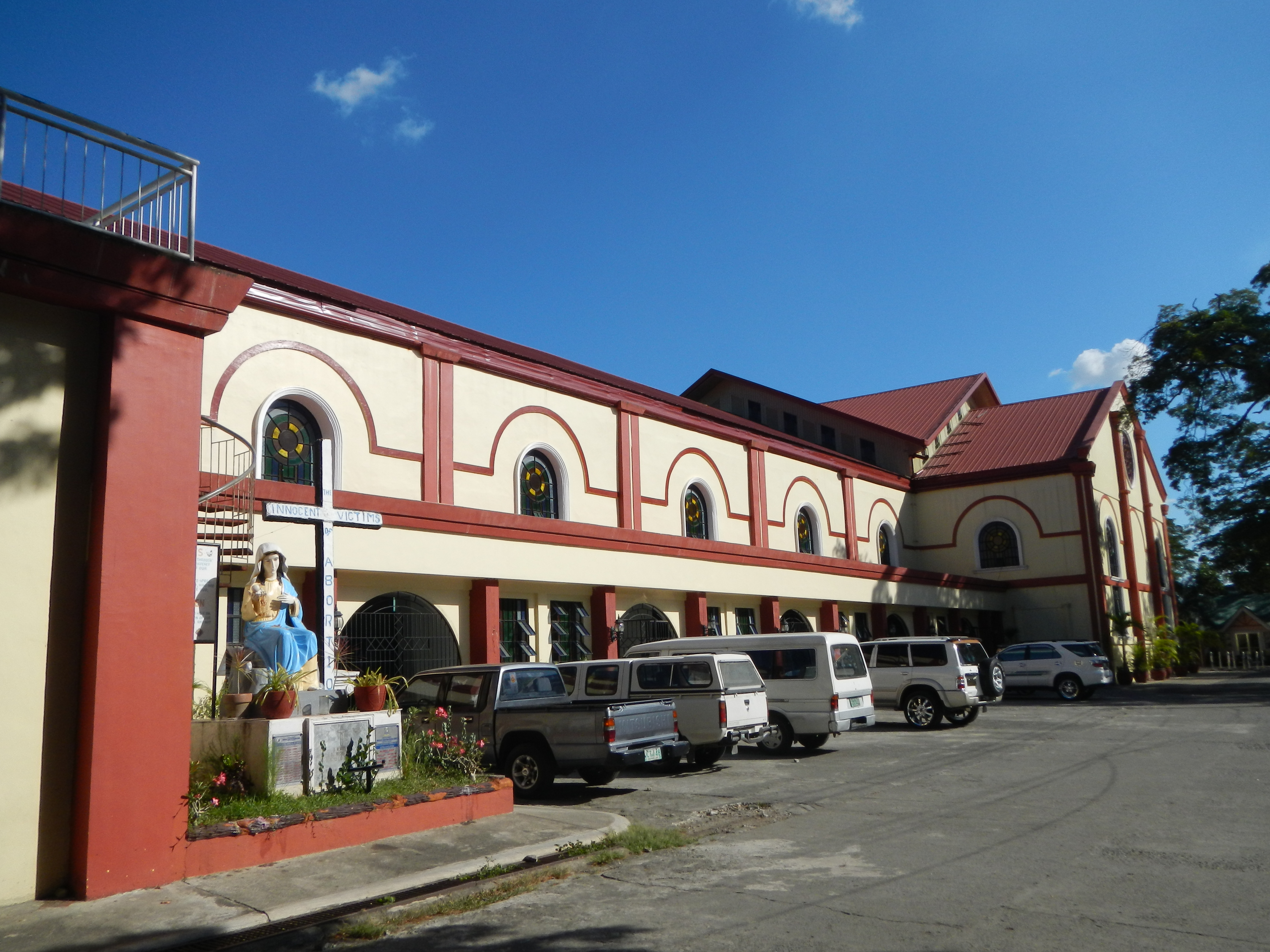
Cathedral side entrances

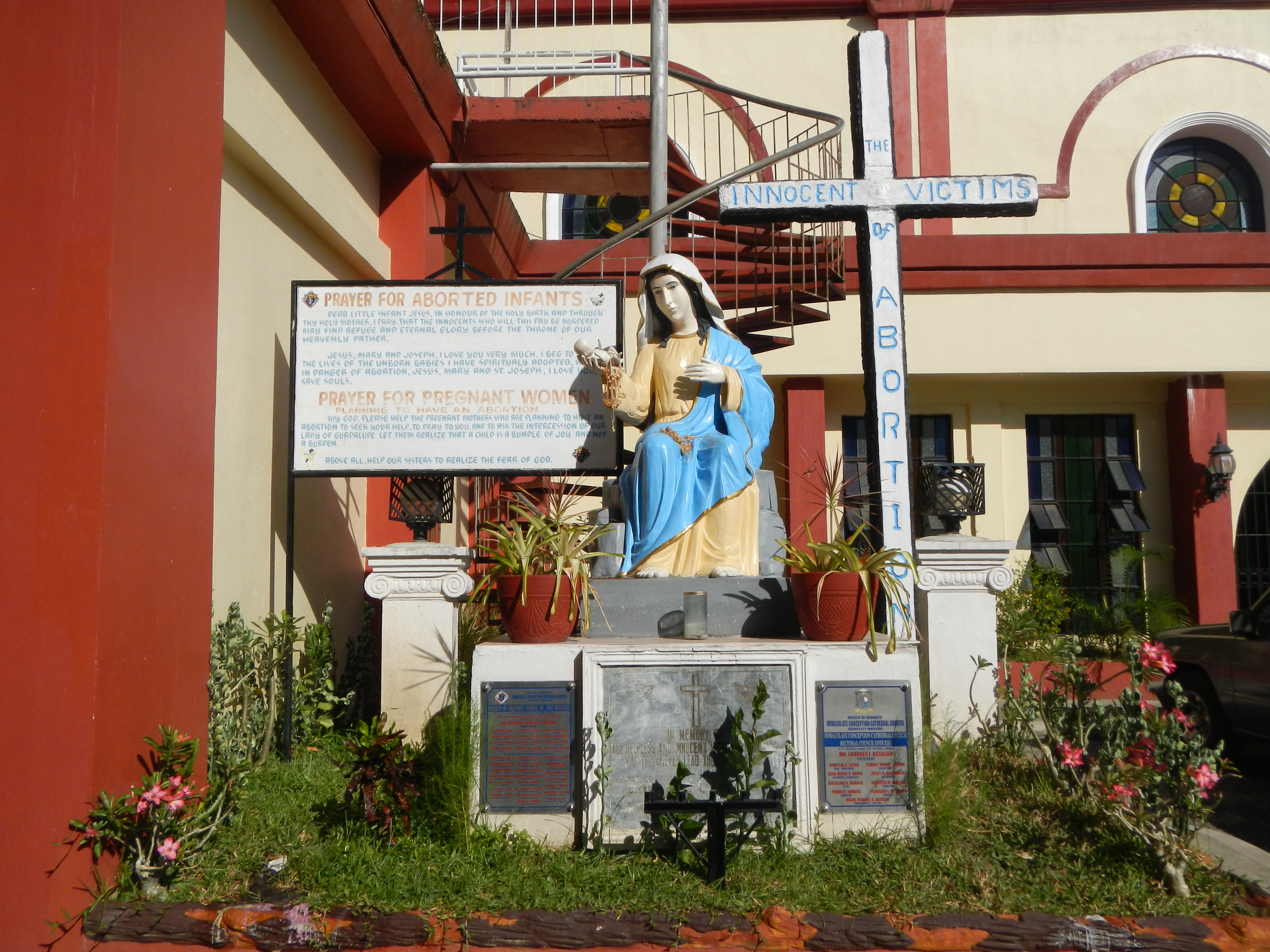
Memorial for abortion victims at the bell tower's base

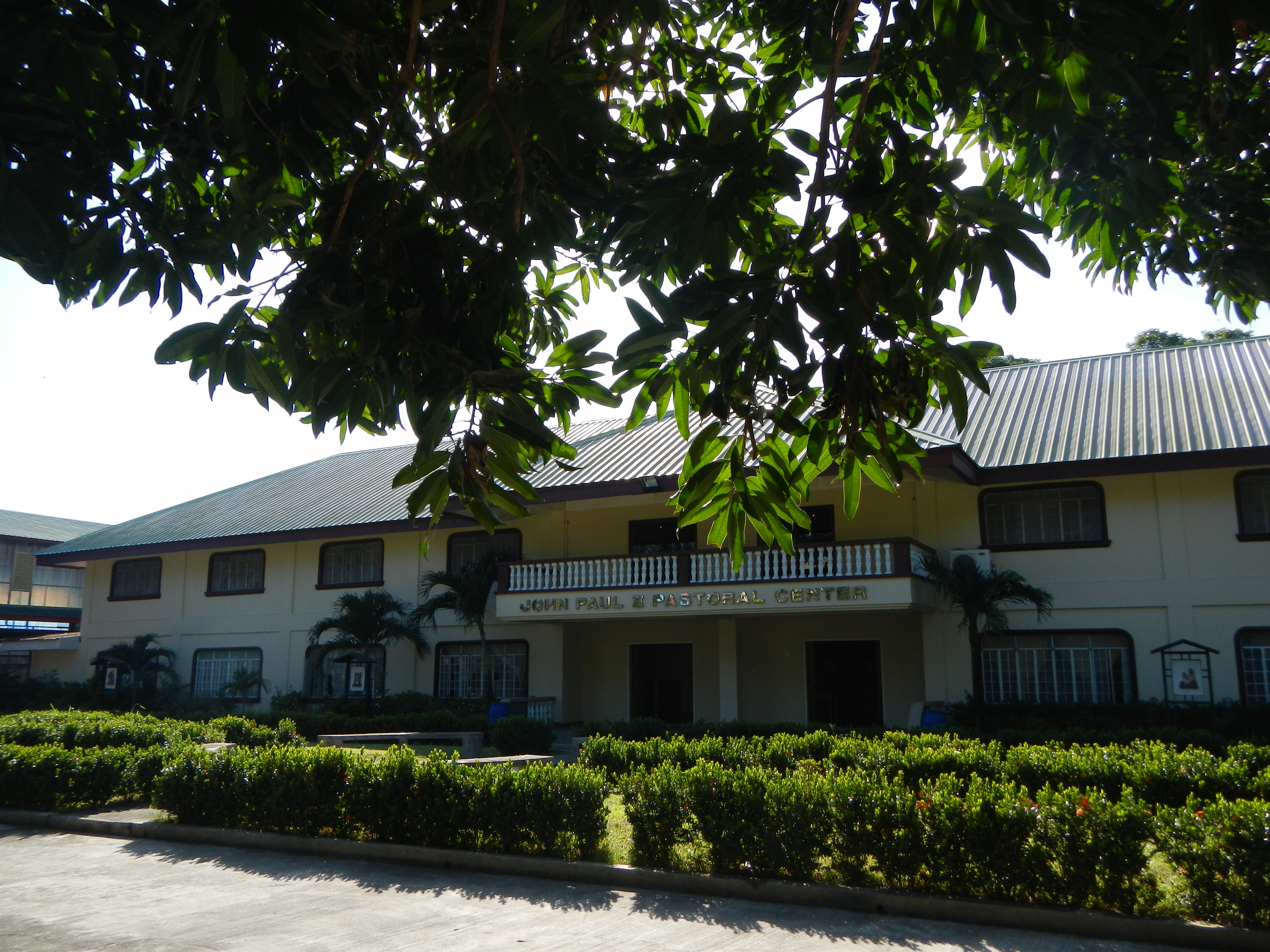
Saint John Paul II Pastoral Center

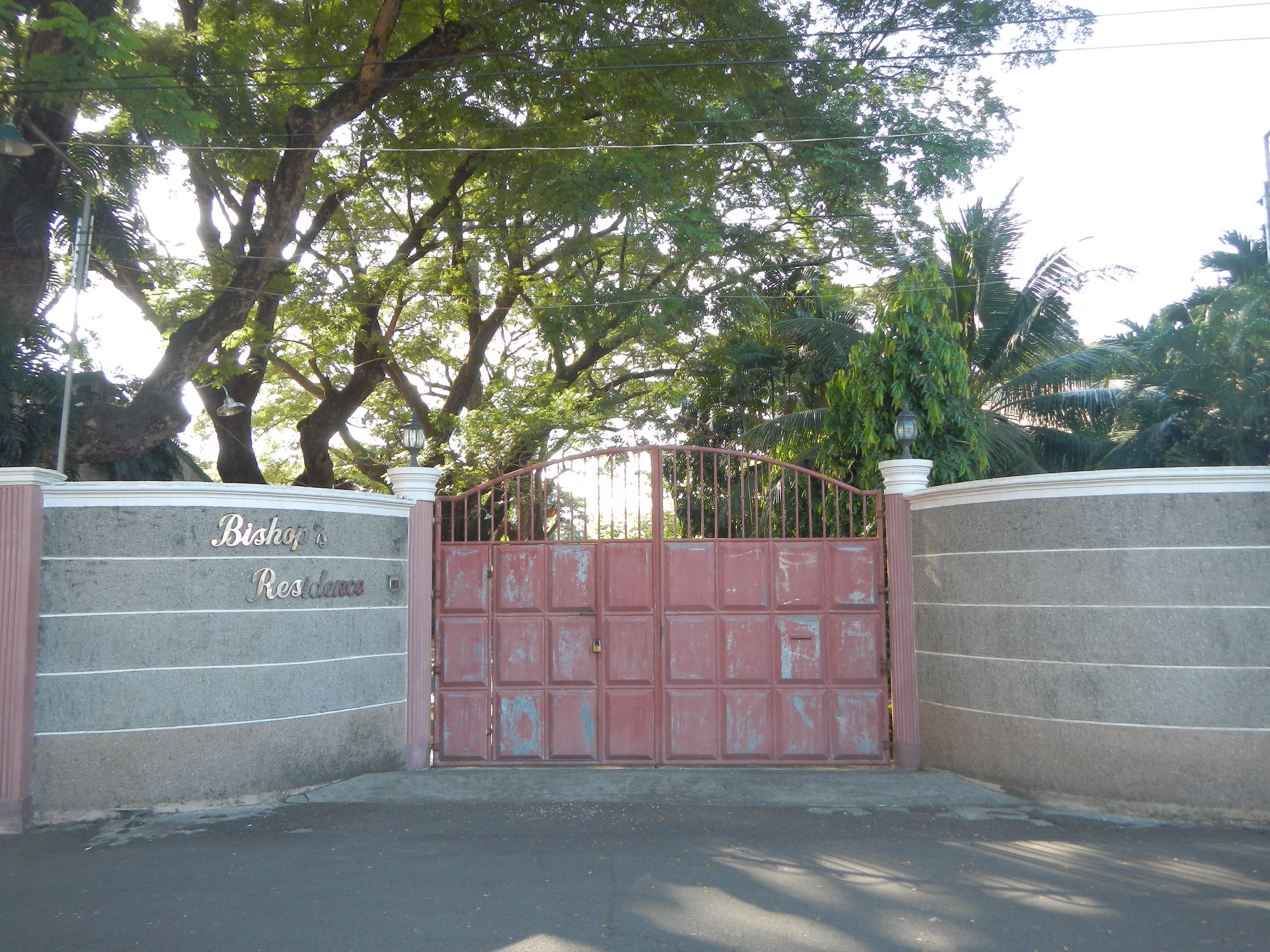
Urdaneta bishop's residence
