= Diocese of Urdaneta =

Latin Catholic diocese in the Philippines

Diocese of Urdaneta Dioecesis Urdanetensis Diosis na Urdaneta Diocesis ti Urdaneta Diyosesis ng Urdaneta Diócesis de Urdaneta

Catholic
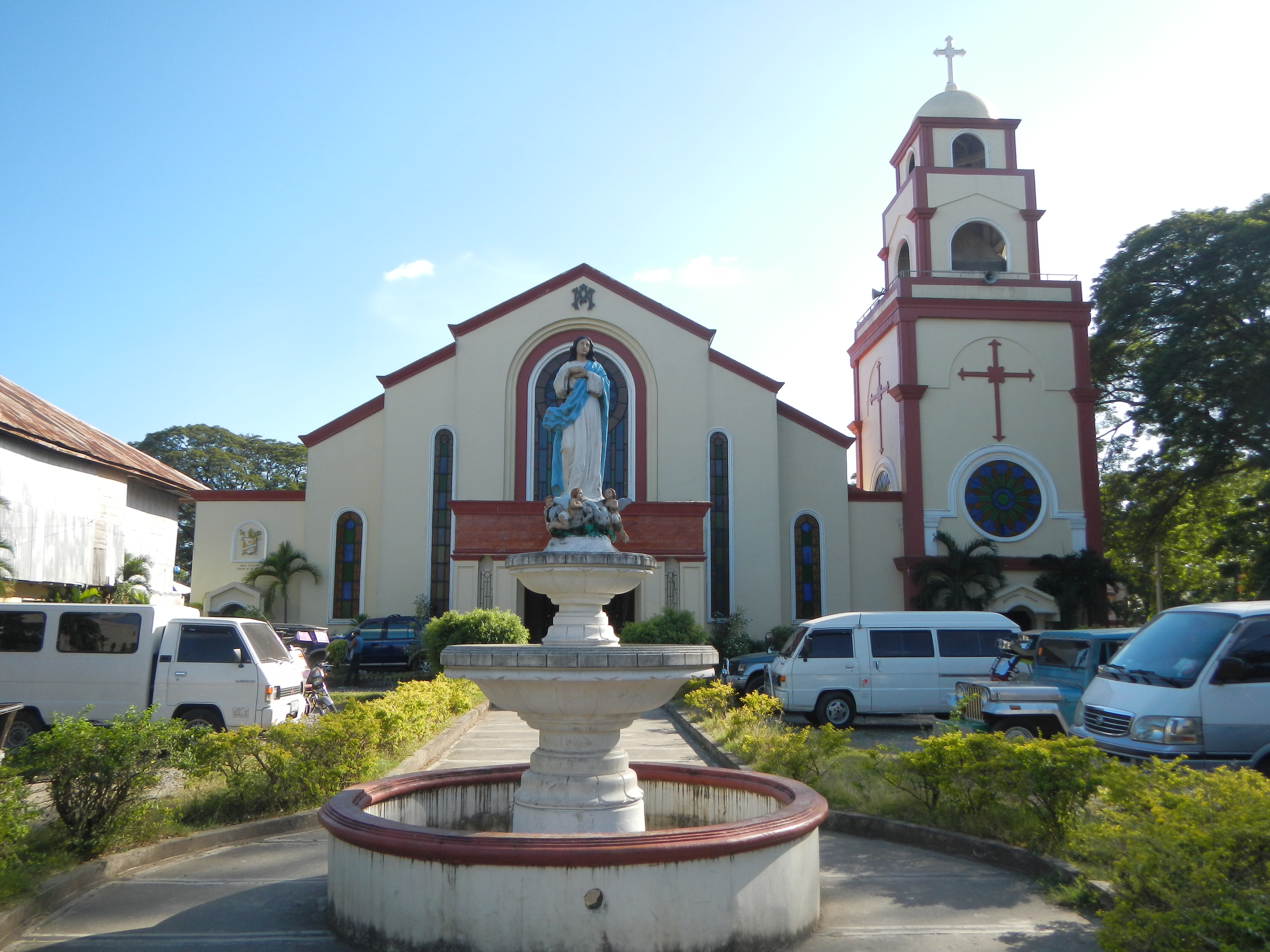
- Urdaneta Cathedral

- Coat of arms

Location
- Country: Philippines
- Territory: Eastern Pangasinan (Alcala, Asingan, Balungao, Binalonan, Natividad, Pozorrubio, Rosales, San Manuel, San Nicolas, San Quintin, Santa Maria, Santo Tomas, Sison, Tayug, Umingan, Urdaneta, Villasis)
- Ecclesiastical province: Lingayen–Dagupan
- Coordinates: 15°58′25″N 120°34′02″E

Statistics
- Area: 1,616 km^{2} (624 sq mi)
- Population: Total; Catholics: (as of 2021); 857,250; 692,968 (80.8%)
- Parishes: 29

Information
- Denomination: Catholic Church
- Sui iuris church: Latin Church
- Rite: Roman Rite
- Established: January 12, 1985
- Cathedral: Cathedral-Parish of the Immaculate Conception
- Patron saint: Immaculate Conception
- Secular priests: 39

Current leadership
- Pope: Leo XIV
- Bishop: Nick Argel Vaquilar
- Metropolitan Archbishop: Socrates B. Villegas
- Vicar General: Msgr. Numeriano Gabot Jr.
- Bishops emeritus: Jacinto Agcaoili Jose

The Diocese of Urdaneta (Latin: Dioecesis Urdanetensis) is a Latin Church ecclesiastical jurisdiction or diocese of the Catholic Church in the Philippines. The diocese was established in 1985 from territory of the Archdiocese of Lingayen–Dagupan.

== Ordinaries ==
Ordinaries of the Diocese of Urdaneta
No.	Portrait	Name	Coat of arms	From	Until	Duration	Notes
Bishops of Urdaneta (April 22, 1985 – present)
1		Pedro G. Magugat, M.S.C. 1925–1990		22 Apr 1985	5 May 1990	5 years, 13 days	First bishop of the diocese; died in office.
2		Jesus C. Galang; 1932–2004		7 Dec 1991	16 Sep 2004	12 years, 9 months, 9 days	Died while serving as bishop.
3		Jacinto A. Jose; 1950–		21 Sep 2005	3 May 2026	20 years, 7 months, 13 days	Retired.
4		Nick A. Vaquilar; 1970–		28 July 2026	Incumbent	0 days	ongoing

== Educational institutions ==
- Divine Word College of Urdaneta - Urdaneta City
- Escuela de San Antonio - Rosales
- Holy Child Academy - Binalonan
- Holy Rood Academy - Alcala
- Immaculate Conception Catholic School - Umingan
- Mary Help of Christians Learning Center - Pozzorubio
- Our Lady of Mt. Carmel Academy - Sison
- Our Lady of the Lilies Academy - Urdaneta City
- Our Lady of the Pillar Catholic School - Sta. Maria
- St. Anthony Abbot Academy - Villasis
- St. Mary's Dominican School - San Manuel
- St. Paschal Catholic School - San Quintin
- St. Patrick Catholic School, Inc - Tayug
- St. Philomena's Academy - Pozorrubio
- St. Louis Bertrand School, Inc. - Asingan

== Parishes ==
Vicariate of Our Lady

- Our Lady of Immaculate Conception Cathedral Parish - Urdaneta City
- Our Lady of Lourdes Parish - Pedro T. Orata, Urdaneta City
- Our Lady of the Universe Parish - San Jose, Urdaneta City
- Divine Mercy Parish - Cabaruan, Urdaneta City

Vicariate of St. Joseph

- St. Vincent Ferrer Parish - Bantog, Asingan
- Our Lady of the Pillar Parish - Sta. Maria
- St. Patrick of Ireland Parish - Tayug
- St. Nicolas of Tolentine Parish - San Nicolas
- Our Lady of Nativity Parish - Natividad
- Our Lady of the Miraculous Medal Parish - Panganiban, Tayug
- St. Paschal Baylon Parish - San Quintin
- Our Lady of the Immaculate Conception Parish - Umingan
- San Lorenzo Ruiz Quasi-Parish - Libsong, Sta. Maria

Vicariate of Sacred Heart

- San Isidro Labrador Parish - San Leon, Umingan
- St. Joseph Parish - Balungao
- St. Anthony of Padua Parish - Rosales City
- Nuestra Señora del Carmen Parish - Carmen, Rosales City
- St. Thomas Aquinas Parish - Sto. Tomas
- Holy Cross Parish - Alcala
- St. Anthony Abbot Parish - Villasis
- Our Lady of Guadalupe Parish - Piaz, Villasis

Vicariate of St. John Mary Vianney

- Our Lady of Mount Carmel Parish - Sison
- St. Padre Pio of Pietrelcina Parish - Palguyod, Pozorrubio
- St. Jude Thaddeus Parish - Pozorrubio
- San Rafael Parish - Linmansangan, Binalonan
- Santo Niño Parish - Binalonan
- St. Bartholomew Parish - San Manuel
- St. Louis Bertrand Parish - Asingan
- St. John Marie Vianney Quasi-Parish - Cabaritan, Sison

== Affiliated bishops from the Diocese of Urdaneta ==
- Marlo Mendoza Peralta, DD, archbishop-emeritus of Nueva Segovia and former bishop of the Diocese of Alaminos from 2007 to 2014. He was one of the clergies of the Diocese of Urdaneta for thirty years.

== See also ==
- Catholic Church in the Philippines
- List of Catholic dioceses in the Philippines
