= Villasis =

Municipality in Pangasinan, Philippines

- Municipality
- Municipality of Villasis
- Villasis Municipal Hall along MacArthur Highway Agno River along Villasis Saint Anthony the Abbot Parish Church

- Seal

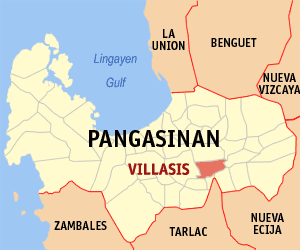
- Map of Pangasinan with Villasis highlighted
- Interactive map of Villasis
- Location within the Philippines
- Coordinates: 15°54′N 120°35′E
- Country: Philippines
- Region: Ilocos Region
- Province: Pangasinan
- District: 5th district
- Founded: March 4, 1748
- Barangays: 21 (see Barangays)

Government
  - Type: Sangguniang Bayan
  - Mayor: Nonato S. Abrenica
  - Vice Mayor: Cheryll Z. Tan
  - Representative: Ramon V. Guico III
  - Municipal Council: Members: Judith M. Morden; Centenielo Ramon R. Costales Jr.; Mario Cesar M. Racadio; Domingo R. Rafanan; Rolando B. Morden; Richie V. Cacapit; Chrisanto Asenafe D. Balila; Felix Ferdinand R. Sison
  - Electorate: 44,707 voters (2025)

Area
  - Total: 75.83 km^{2} (29.28 sq mi)
- Elevation: 28 m (92 ft)
- Highest elevation: 45 m (148 ft)
- Lowest elevation: 21 m (69 ft)

Population (2024 census)
  - Total: 65,086
  - Density: 858.3/km^{2} (2,223/sq mi)
  - Households: 16,612

Economy
  - Income class: 1st municipal income class
  - Poverty incidence: 10.81% (2023)
  - Revenue: ₱ 407.9 million (2024)
  - Assets: ₱ 1,249 million (2024)
  - Expenditure: ₱ 261.1 million (2024)
  - Liabilities: ₱ 106.1 million (2024)

Service provider
  - Electricity: Pangasinan 3 Electric Cooperative (PANELCO 3)
- Time zone: UTC+8 (PST)
- ZIP code: 2427
- PSGC: 0105547000
- IDD : area code: +63 (0)75
- Native languages: Pangasinan; Ilocano; Tagalog
- Website: www.villasis.gov.ph

Villasis, officially the Municipality of Villasis (Pangasinan: Baley na Villasis; Ilocano: Ili ti Villasis; Tagalog: Bayan ng Villasis), is a municipality in the province of Pangasinan, Philippines. According to the 2024 census, it has a population of 65,086 people.

== Geography ==
A paddy field in Brgy. Bacag

The Municipality of Villasis is a farming town situated along the Agno River. On its borders are the towns of Malasiqui (to the west), Urdaneta City (to the north), Asingan (to the east), and Rosales and Santo Tomas (to the south). Hemmed between two bustling areas, Urdaneta City and Rosales, Villasis is one of the fastest developing towns in the province. It also thrives on its rice, corn, and tobacco plantations. Its hilly barangays situated along the Malasiqui boundary is an ideal place for resort developers and agri-businessmen.

Villasis is situated 50.01 kilometres (31.07 mi) from the provincial capital Lingayen, and 175.56 kilometres (109.09 mi) from the country's capital city of Manila.

=== Barangays ===
Villasis is politically subdivided into 21 barangays. Each barangay consists of puroks and some have sitios.

- Amamperez
- Bacag
- Barangobong
- Barraca
- Capulaan
- Caramutan
- La Paz
- Labit
- Lipay
- Lomboy
- Piaz (Plaza)
- Zone V (Poblacion)
- Zone I (Poblacion)
- Zone II (Poblacion)
- Zone III (Poblacion)
- Zone IV (Poblacion)
- Puelay
- San Blas
- San Nicolas
- Tombod
- Unzad

=== Climate ===
Climate data for Villasis, Pangasinan
Month	Jan	Feb	Mar	Apr	May	Jun	Jul	Aug	Sep	Oct	Nov	Dec	Year
Mean daily maximum °C (°F)	29 (84)	29 (84)	30 (86)	32 (90)	33 (91)	33 (91)	33 (91)	33 (91)	33 (91)	32 (90)	31 (88)	29 (84)	31 (88)
Mean daily minimum °C (°F)	21 (70)	21 (70)	22 (72)	23 (73)	24 (75)	24 (75)	24 (75)	24 (75)	23 (73)	23 (73)	22 (72)	21 (70)	23 (73)
Average precipitation mm (inches)	127.5 (5.02)	115.8 (4.56)	129.7 (5.11)	141.1 (5.56)	248.2 (9.77)	165 (6.5)	185.3 (7.30)	161.9 (6.37)	221.4 (8.72)	299.5 (11.79)	199 (7.8)	188.7 (7.43)	2,183.1 (85.93)
Average rainy days	17	17	17	15	20	19	19	20	21	20	17	19	221
Source: World Weather Online

== Demographics ==
Population census of Villasis
Year	Pop.	±% p.a.
1903	12,660	—
1918	14,233	+0.78%
1939	18,452	+1.24%
1948	23,952	+2.94%
1960	27,037	+1.01%
1970	31,676	+1.59%
1975	36,080	+2.65%
1980	39,126	+1.63%
1990	47,475	+1.95%
1995	49,657	+0.85%
2000	54,224	+1.90%
2007	56,668	+0.61%
2010	59,111	+1.55%
2015	62,333	+1.02%
2020	65,047	+0.90%
2024	65,086	+0.01%
Source: Philippine Statistics Authority

=== Religion ===
==== Saint Anthony the Abbot Parish Church ====
The heritage Saint Anthony the Abbot Parish Church, built in 1763, is part of the Roman Catholic Diocese of Urdaneta (from the Archdiocese of Lingayen-Dagupan). Feast Day: January 17; Parish Priest: Father Arturo F. Aquino & Parochial Vicar: Father Dionisio B. Luzano.

Crusaders Divine Church of Christ, Brgy. Amanperez

==== Evangelical Churches and other Denominations ====
There are also other religious denominations in the municipality such as Iglesia Filipina Independiente, United Methodist Church, Iglesia ni Cristo, Jesus is Lord Church, Assembly of God, and other evangelical churches. A Muslim group also holds their worship. Interestingly, the town of Villasis celebrates their yearly fiesta with Thanksgiving Night at the beginning of their week-long celebration to mark their gratefulness to God. The said Thanksgiving Night is conducted in coordination with Christian Churches Organization in Villasis (CCOV).

== Economy ==
Poverty incidence of Villasis (%)

Source: Philippine Statistics Authority

The town's accessibility to all kinds of land transportation has made Villasis a bustling center of trade and commerce. It is intersected by the Manila North Road from north to south, allowing all major bus lines plying the Manila-Region I CAR route to pass through the town 24-hours a day. The main agricultural crops of the town are rice, corn, cassava, and varieties of vegetables and fruits. Raising livestock is another livelihood of the townspeople who raise poultry, swine, goat and cattle.

There are 56 registered small to medium-sized industries in Villasis. These include rice mills, metalcraft industries, cement production, poultry raising and piggeries and an ice-plant.

== Government ==
=== Local government ===
Villasis is part of the fifth congressional district of the province of Pangasinan. It is governed by a mayor designated, as its local chief executive, and by a municipal council as its legislative body in accordance with the Local Government Code. The mayor, vice mayor, and the councilors are elected directly by the people through an election which is being held every three years.

=== Elected officials ===
Members of the Municipal Council (2025–2028)
Position	Name
Congressman	Ramon V. Guico III
Mayor	Ditas G. Abrenica
Vice-Mayor	Cheryll Z. Tan
Councilors	Paz S. Rafanan
Councilors	Nico Blanco
Councilors	Domingo Rafanan
Councilors	Nydia Cacapit
Councilors	Atty. Judith M. Morden
Councilors	Chrisanto Asenafe D. Balila
Councilors	Rolando B. Morden
Councilors	Audrey Jamille Susan Sison

== Culture ==
The town holds an annual fiesta in honor of its patron saint, San Antonio de Abad (Saint Anthony the Abbot).

=== Talong festival ===
On January 18, 2008, Mayor Nonato Abrenica announced that hundreds of balikbayans joined the annual fiesta celebration, highlighted by the Talong Festival / fastest talong eater contest (boiled skin removed eggplant, long-purple casino type), in Villasis, Pangasinan. 12 of 21 villages / barangays are engaged in eggplant production with total of 3.35 km^{2} planted by 600 residents. It is usually celebrated during the second week of January.

== Education ==
There are two schools district offices which govern all educational institutions within the municipality. They oversee the management and operations of all private and public, from primary to secondary schools. These are Villasis I Schools District Office, and Villasis II Schools District Office.

San Nicolas Elementary School

=== Primary and elementary schools ===
- Amamperez Elementary School
- Bacag Central School
- Bacag East Elementary School
- Bacag West Elementary School
- Barraca Community School
- Barangobong Elementary School
- Capulaan Elementary School
- Caramutan Elementary School
- Cleverkids School
- Feliz Academy
- La Paz Elementary School
- Labit Elementary School
- Lepanto Elementary School
- Lipay Elementary School
- Lomboy Elementary School
- Maburac Elementary School
- Piaz Elementary School
- Puelay Elementary School
- San Blas Elementary School
- San Nicolas Elementary School
- Stars Educational Center
- St. Anthony Abbot Academy
- Unzad Elementary School
- Villasis I Central School SPED Center
- West Poblacion Elementary School

Amamperez Agro-Industrial High School

=== Secondary schools ===
- Amamperez Agro-Industrial High School
- Barangobong National High School
- Capulaan National High School
- Don Ramon E. Costales Memorial National High School
- Piaz National High School
- Tombod Integrated School
- Unzad National High School

== Gallery ==
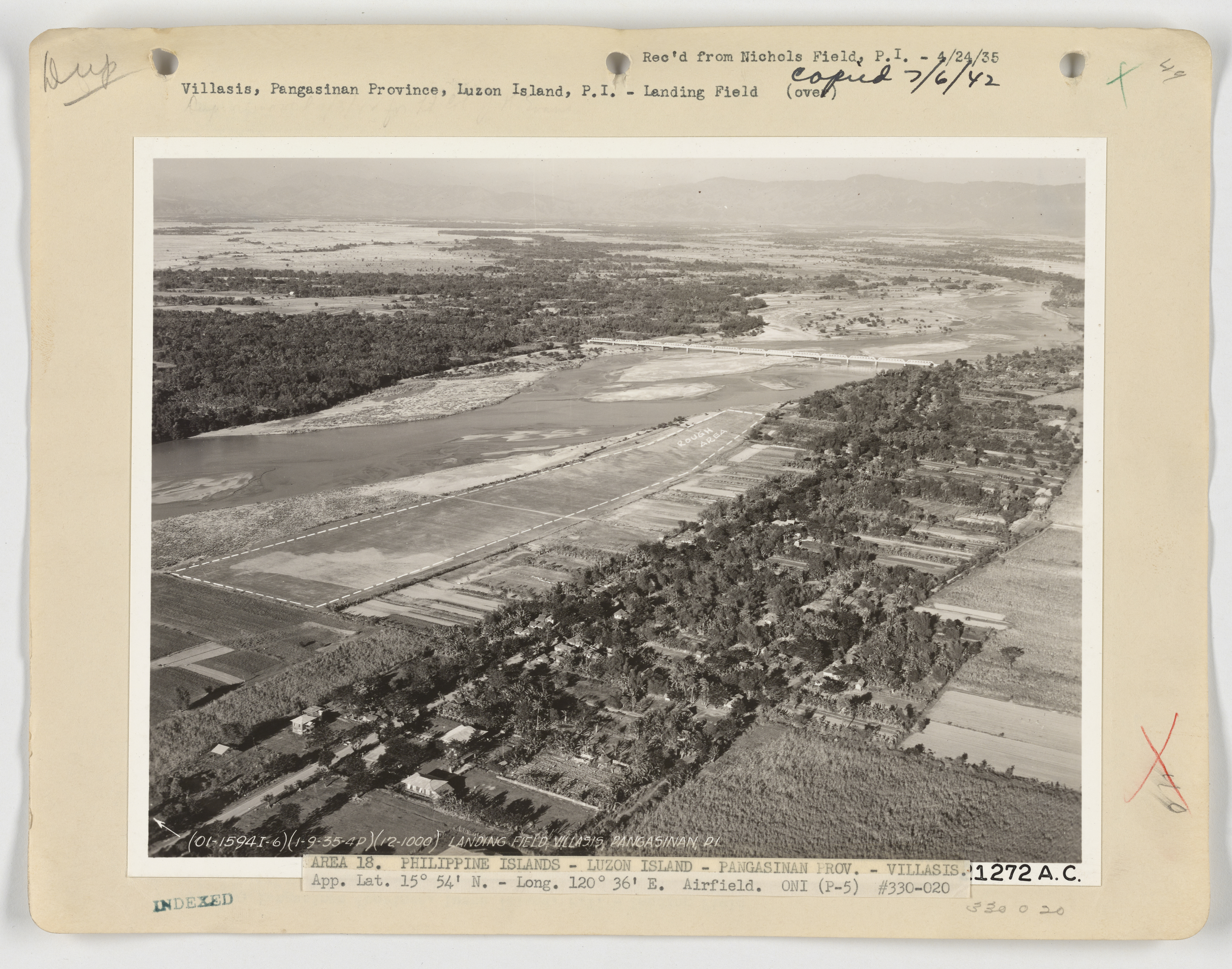
Aerial view of Villasis, circa 1930s

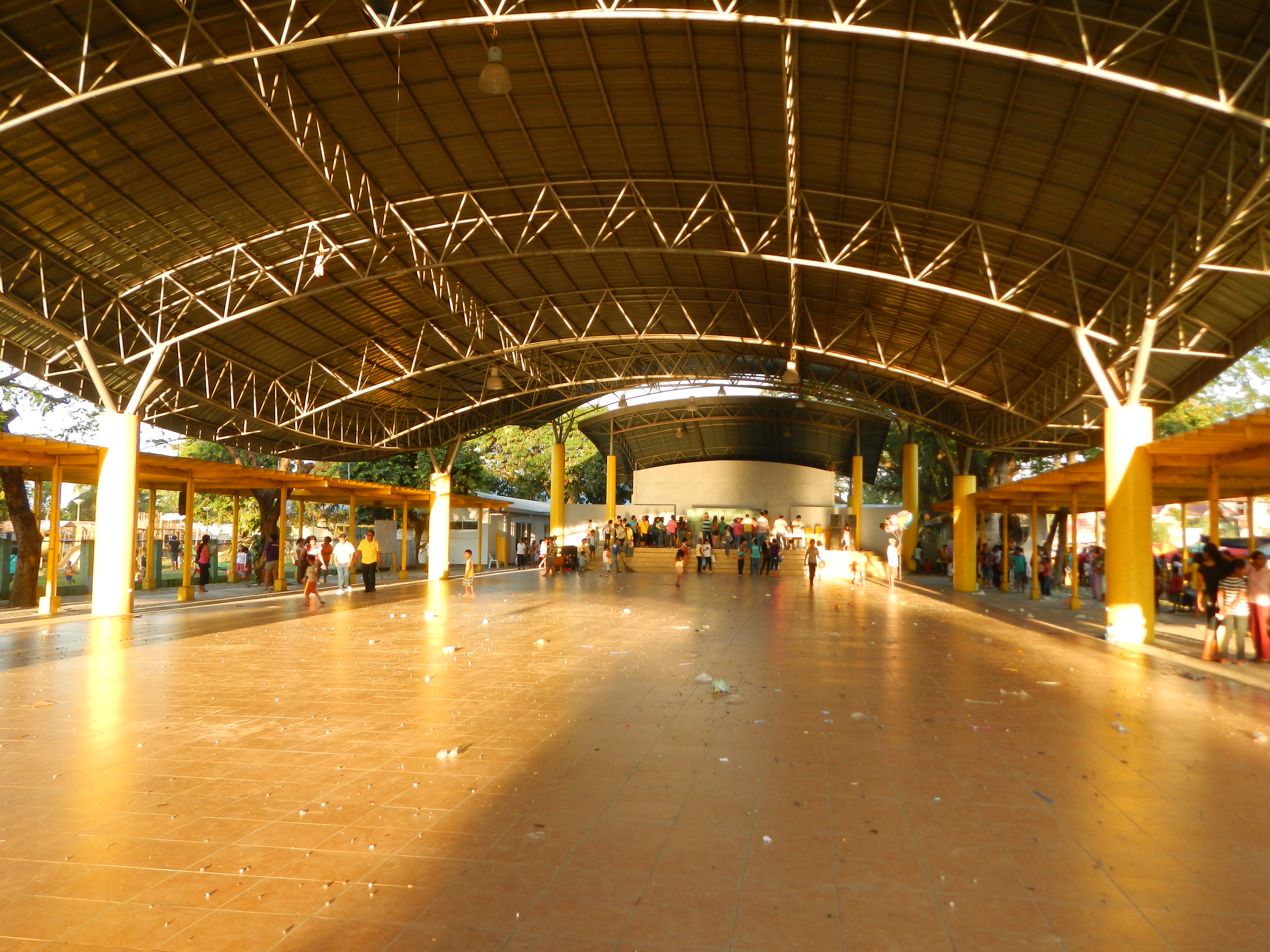
Public Auditorium

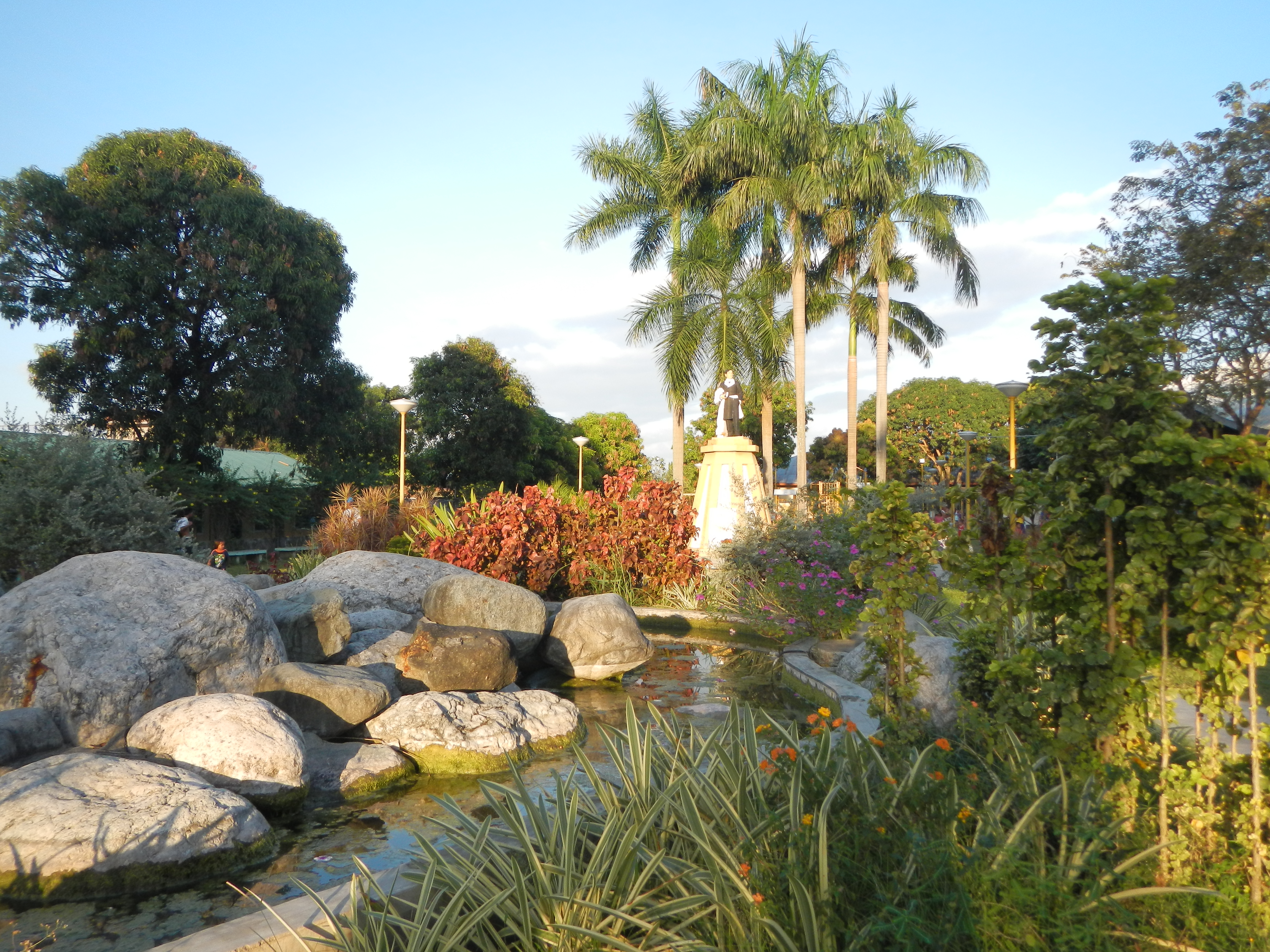
Rizal Park

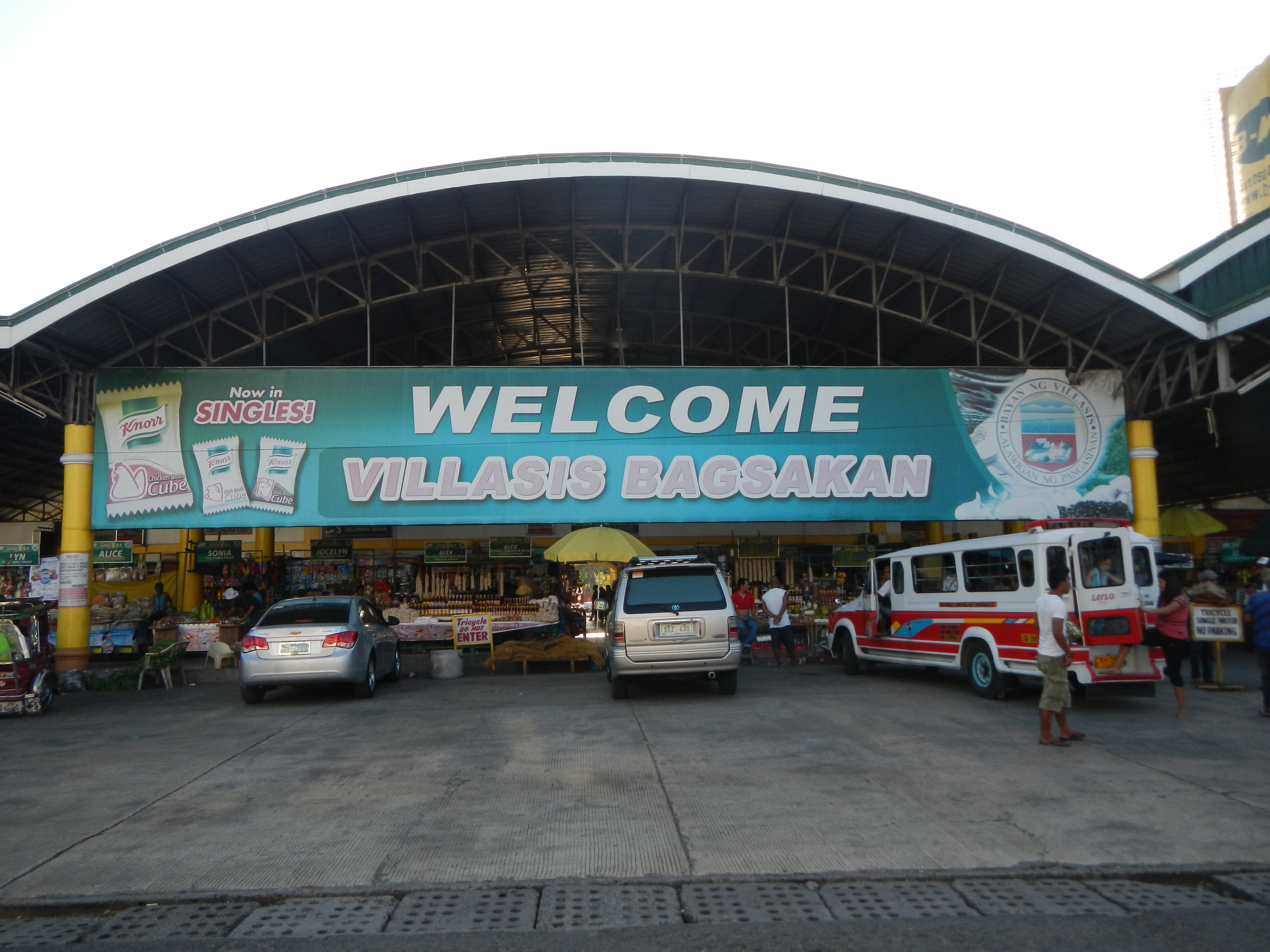
Villasis Public Market and Bagsakan Center

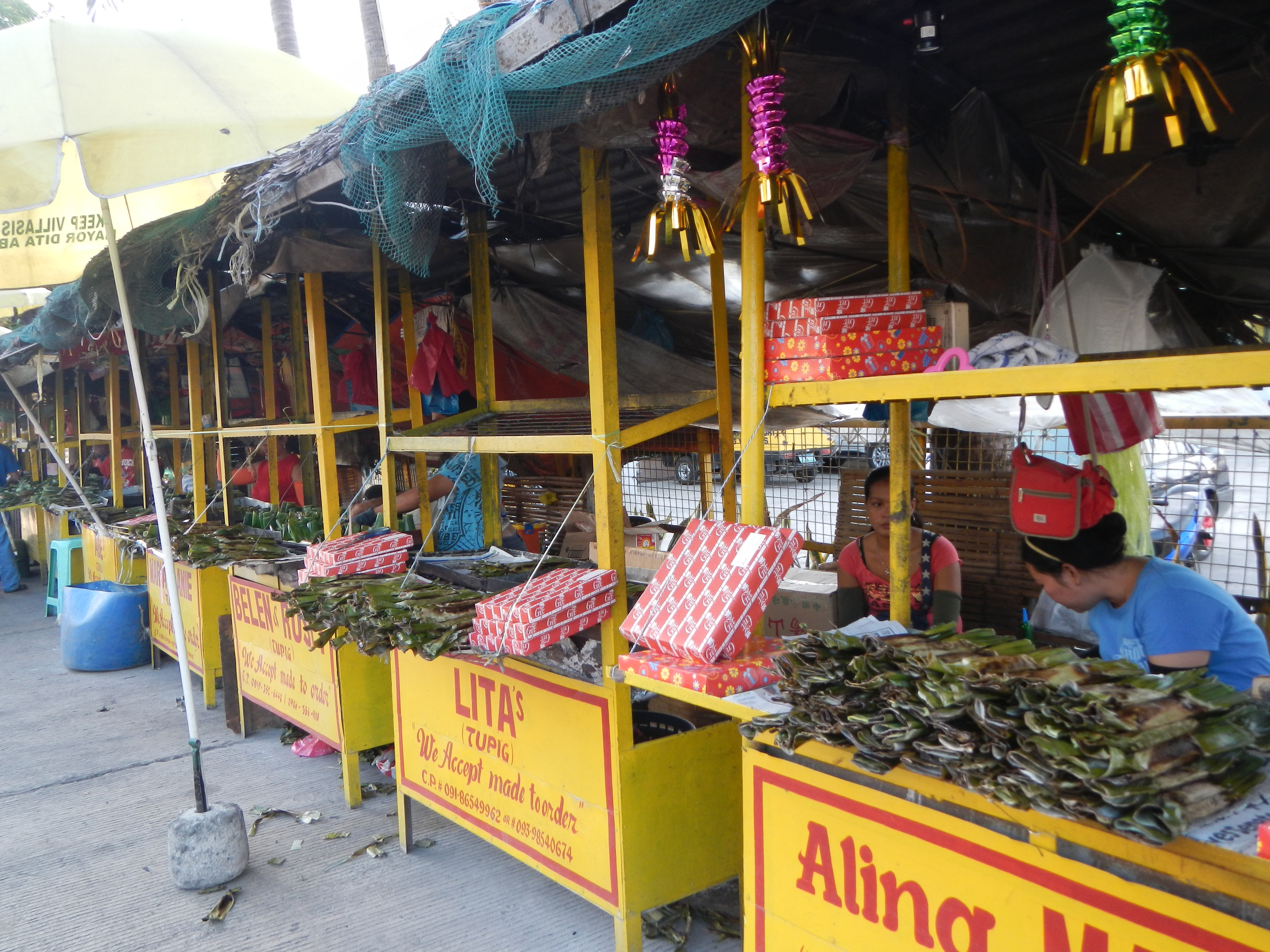
Bagsakan stores
