= Alcala, Pangasinan =

Municipality in Pangasinan, Philippines

Alcala
- Municipality
- Municipality of Alcala
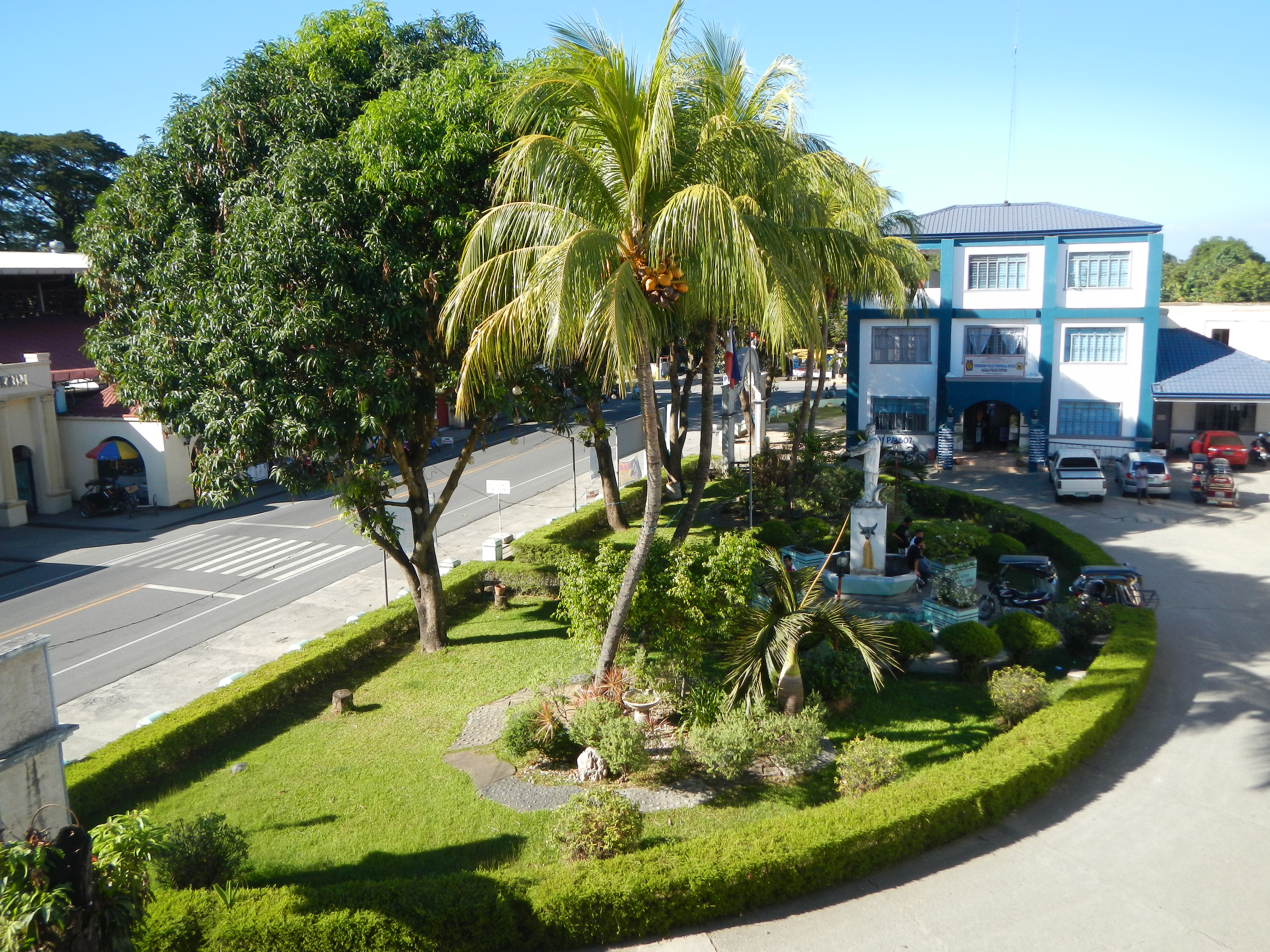
- Santo Tomas-Alcala Highway

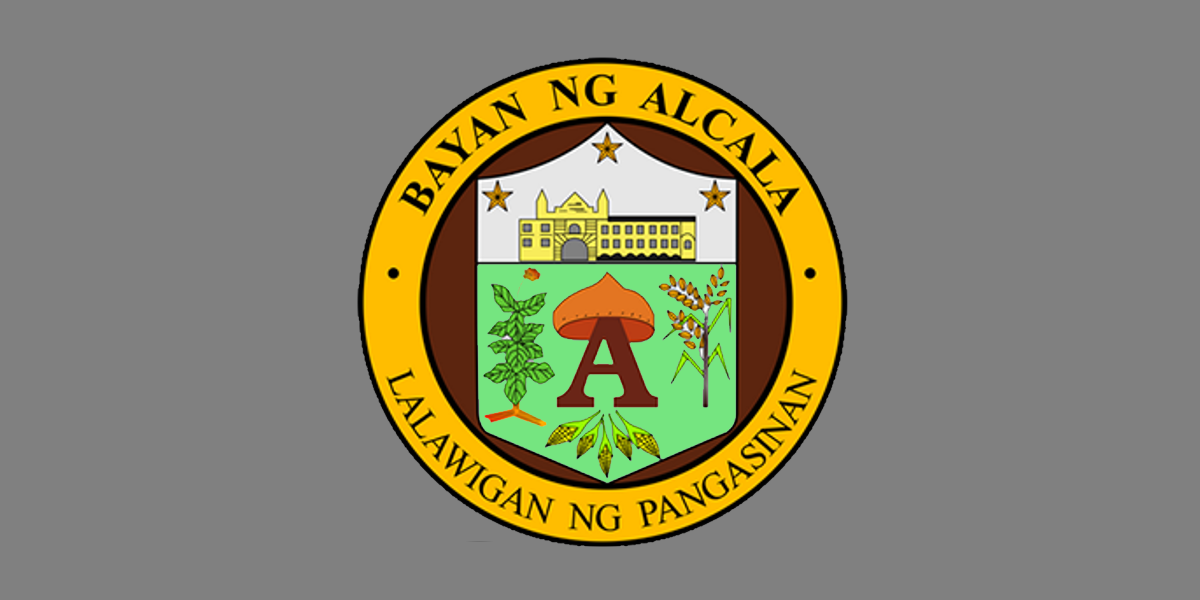
- Flag Seal
- Motto: Kalinisan, Kalusugan, Karapatan (English: Environment, Health, Rights)
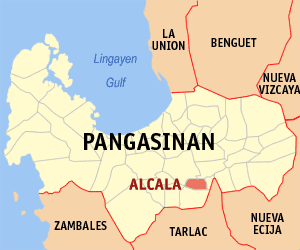
- Map of Pangasinan with Alcala highlighted
- Interactive map of Alcala
- Location within the Philippines
- Coordinates: 15°50′48″N 120°31′19″E
- Country: Philippines
- Region: Ilocos Region
- Province: Pangasinan
- District: 5th district
- Founded: September 20, 1875
- Barangays: 16 (see Barangays)

Government
  - Type: Sangguniang Bayan
  - Mayor: Manuel T. Collado
  - Vice Mayor: Jojo B. Callejo
  - Representative: Ramon N. Guico Jr.
  - Municipal Council: Members: Rodelio C. Labiano; Marcelino B. Tercias; Rodolfo C. Rosquita; Janela Love B. Nartates; Amado D. Bauzon; Cherry Beth C. Mamitag; Mark Ryan C. Catalan; Amor G. Espiritu
  - Electorate: 31,431 voters (2025)

Area
  - Total: 45.71 km^{2} (17.65 sq mi)
- Elevation: 23 m (75 ft)
- Highest elevation: 53 m (174 ft)
- Lowest elevation: 15 m (49 ft)

Population (2024 census)
  - Total: 49,479
  - Density: 1,082/km^{2} (2,804/sq mi)
  - Households: 11,999

Economy
  - Income class: 1st municipal income class
  - Poverty incidence: 12.32% (2023)
  - Revenue: ₱ 335.5 million (2024)
  - Assets: ₱ 798.1 million (2024)
  - Expenditure: ₱ 251.1 million (2024)
  - Liabilities: ₱ 68.64 million (2024)

Service provider
  - Electricity: Central Pangasinan Electric Cooperative (CENPELCO)
- Time zone: UTC+8 (PST)
- ZIP code: 2425
- PSGC: 0105504000
- IDD : area code: +63 (0)75
- Native languages: Pangasinan; Ilocano; Tagalog
- Major religions: Roman Catholic
- Feast date: May 3(Feast of the Finding of the True Cross)
- Catholic diocese: Roman Catholic Diocese of Urdaneta
- Patron saint: Santa Cruz de Alcala

Alcala, officially the Municipality of Alcala (Pangasinan: Baley na Alcala; Ilocano: Ili ti Alcala; Tagalog: Bayan ng Alcala), is a municipality in the province of Pangasinan, Philippines. According to the 2024 census, it has a population of 49,479 people.

== History ==
What is known now as Alcala was formerly a barrio of Bayambang, formerly called "Dangla", a vernacular term referring to a medicinal shrub which grows abundantly in the place. As a barrio, it was subdivided into several smaller units called sitios, namely: Bugyao, Bacud, Cupi, Bitulao, Cabicalan, Patalan, Camanggaan and Sinabaan

On April 1, 1873, the settlers established a community. They submitted a petition calling for the cessation of Dangla into a separate township, but it took more than two years for the Spanish Authorities to take notice of the settlers' demands.

Finally, on September 20, 1875, Royal Decree No. 682 was issued to officially establish the Municipality of Alcala.

During the outbreak of the Philippine–American War, the place was the site of the field headquarters of General Malone of the United States Army.

When the Filipinos and Americans were fighting against the Japanese during World War II, the place was the site for the American Field Headquarters under the command of General Johnathan Wainwright. It was here that the first Guerrilla Combat Training School was established. The same school produced an Infantry Battalion composed mostly of Alcaleneans who played an important role in defending the whole of Northern Luzon from Japanese forces.

The municipality of Santo Tomas was established out of Alcala on October 31, 1906.

== Geography ==
Alcala has a total land area of 5,508 hectares (13,610 acres). It is situated 47.07 kilometers (29.25 mi) from the provincial capital Lingayen, and 183.46 kilometers (114.00 mi) from the country's capital city of Manila.

=== Barangays ===
Alcala is politically subdivided into 21 barangays. Each barangay consists of puroks and some have sitios.

- Anulid
- Atainan
- Bersamin
- Canarvacanan
- Caranglaan
- Curareng
- Gualsic
- Kisikis
- Laoac
- Macayo
- Pindangan Centro
- Pindangan East
- Pindangan West
- Poblacion East
- Poblacion West
- San Juan
- San Nicolas
- San Pedro Apartado
- San Pedro Ili
- San Vicente
- Vacante

=== Climate ===
Climate data for Alcala, Pangasinan
Month	Jan	Feb	Mar	Apr	May	Jun	Jul	Aug	Sep	Oct	Nov	Dec	Year
Mean daily maximum °C (°F)	31 (88)	31 (88)	31 (88)	33 (91)	32 (90)	32 (90)	30 (86)	30 (86)	30 (86)	31 (88)	31 (88)	31 (88)	31 (88)
Mean daily minimum °C (°F)	21 (70)	21 (70)	22 (72)	24 (75)	24 (75)	24 (75)	23 (73)	23 (73)	23 (73)	23 (73)	23 (73)	22 (72)	23 (73)
Average precipitation mm (inches)	5.1 (0.20)	11.6 (0.46)	21.1 (0.83)	27.7 (1.09)	232.9 (9.17)	350.8 (13.81)	679.8 (26.76)	733.1 (28.86)	505 (19.9)	176.6 (6.95)	67.2 (2.65)	17.7 (0.70)	2,828.6 (111.38)
Average rainy days	3	3	3	4	14	18	23	25	22	15	8	4	142
Source: World Weather Online (modeled/calculated data, not measured locally)

== Demographics ==
Population census of Alcala

Year	Pop.	±% p.a.
1903	9,008	—
1918	9,054	+0.03%
1939	12,697	+1.62%
1948	17,064	+3.34%
1960	20,297	+1.46%
1970	22,208	+0.90%

Year	Pop.	±% p.a.
1975	24,376	+1.89%
1980	24,993	+0.50%
1990	30,684	+2.07%
1995	31,974	+0.77%
2000	35,734	+2.41%
2007	38,934	+1.19%

Year	Pop.	±% p.a.
2010	41,077	+1.97%
2015	43,402	+1.05%
2020	48,908	+2.55%
2024	49,479	+0.28%

Source: Philippine Statistics Authority

== Economy ==
Poverty incidence of Alcala

Source: Philippine Statistics Authority

== Government ==
=== Local government ===
Alcala, belonging to the fifth congressional district of the province of Pangasinan, is governed by a mayor designated as its local chief executive and by a municipal council as its legislative body in accordance with the Local Government Code. The mayor, vice mayor, and the councilors are elected directly by the people through an election which is being held every three years.

=== Elected officials ===
Members of the Municipal Council (2025–2028):

- Congressman: Ramon N. Guico, Jr.
- Mayor: Atty. Manuel T. Collado
- Vice-Mayor: Jojo B. Callejo
- Councilors:
  - Rodelio C. Labiano
  - Marcelino B. Tercias
  - Rodolfo C. Rosquita
  - Janela Love B. Nartates
  - Amado D. Bauzon
  - Cherry Beth C. Mamitag
  - Mark Ryan C. Catalan
  - Amor G. Espiritu

== Tourism ==
A tilapia dispersal and barbecue are part of the attractions in Alcala.

The Municipality has received the Seal of Good Local Governance (SGLG) award eight times for its commitment to good governance, as recognized by the Department of the Interior and Local Government (DILG).

Alcala celebrating its annual founding anniversary every September 20.

Alcala celebrating its Town Fiesta on May 1–3 every year.

San Vicente, Alcala has its Backpack Project.

=== Holy Cross Parish Church ===
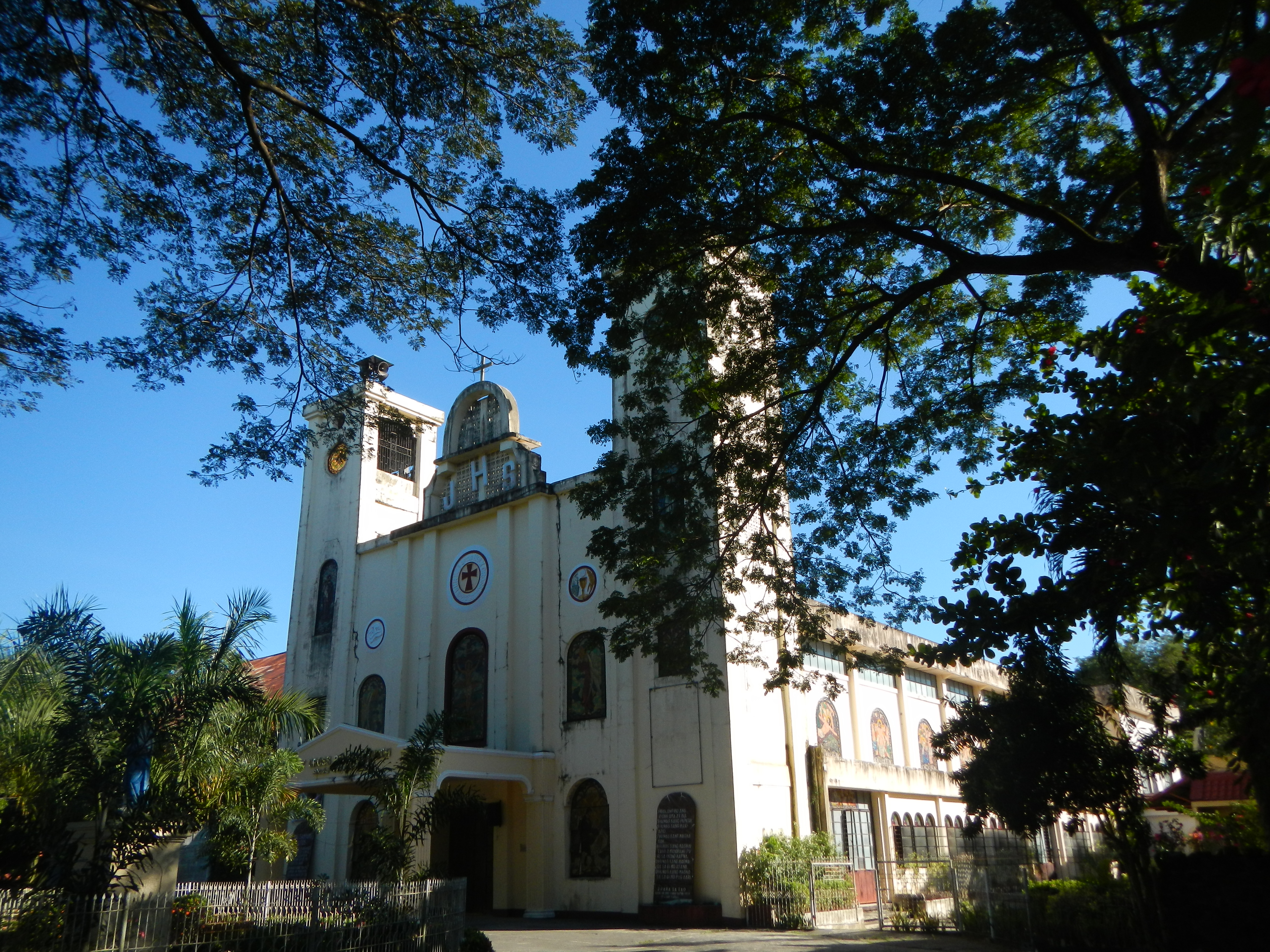
Facade of the Holy Cross Parish (F-1881) Parish Church

The 1881 Holy Cross Parish Church is a Vicariate of Sacred Heart. Its Feast Day are May 3 is the Feast of the Finding of the True Cross and September 14 is the Feast of the Exaltation of the Holy Cross, with the present Parish Priest, Rev. Fr. Christopher Elisar "Ralphie" M. Itchon under the jurisdiction of the Roman Catholic Diocese of Urdaneta.

The January 4, 1881 Spanish Royal Decree of the Spanish Government created the Parish of the Holy Cross and accepted by the Dominicans (House of the Order) on November of 188. Padre Eduardo Saamaniego, O.P., was appointed first parish priest on February 21, 1882. The convent was erected under Fr. Revilla and Fr. Casamitjana but the same was destroyed.

In 1950, Padre Jose V. Ferrer caused the destruction of the old church and instead built a semi-concrete edifice. Aided by Bishop Jesus Sison and Archbishop Mariano Madriaga, the Priest founded the Holy Rood Academy. Fr. Amado Lopez continued the rehabilitation of the Church and school but the 1967 and 1968 Casiguran earthquake annihilated the Church. Thus, Fr. Eusebio Vigilia and Fr. Johnny Tagalicud (1972-1977) rehabilitated the present new Church. (Source, 2007 Fiesta Yearbook of Bani, Pangasinan Church).

== Education ==
The Alcala Schools District Office governs all educational institutions within the municipality. It oversees the management and operations of all private and public elementary and high schools.

=== Primary and elementary schools ===
- Alcala Central School
- Alcala Brookside School
- Anulid Elementary School
- Bersamin Elementary School
- Gods Favor Learning Center
- Gualsic Elementary School
- Guinawedan Elementary School
- Holy Family Educational Institution
- Laoac Elementary School
- Pindangan East Elementary School
- Pindangan West Elementary School
- San Juan Elementary School
- San Pedro Apartado Elementary School
- San Pedro Ili Elementary School
- San Vicente Elementary School
- South Central School
- Vacante Elementary School
- Holy Rood Academy

=== Secondary schools ===
- Arboleda National High School
- Atainan-Caranglaan Integrated School
- Bersamin Agro-Industrial National High School
- Canarvacanan National High School
- Cipriano P. Primicias National High School
- Gualsic Integrated School
- Macayo Integrated School
- Pindangan National High School
- San Pedro Apartado National High School
- Vacante Integrated School

=== Higher educational institutions ===
None
