= Santo Tomas, Pangasinan =

Municipality in Pangasinan, Philippines

Santo Tomas
- Municipality
- Municipality of Santo Tomas
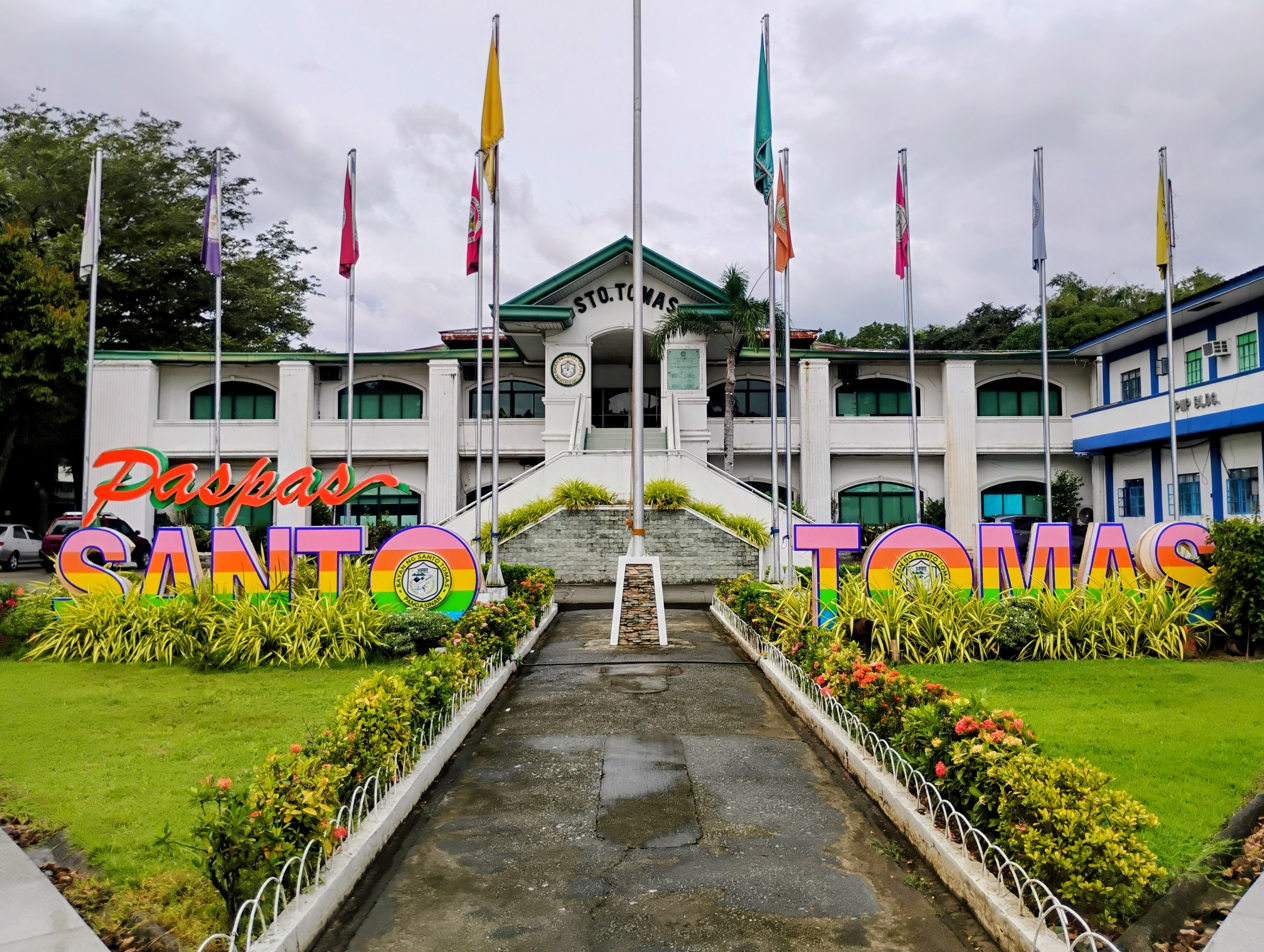
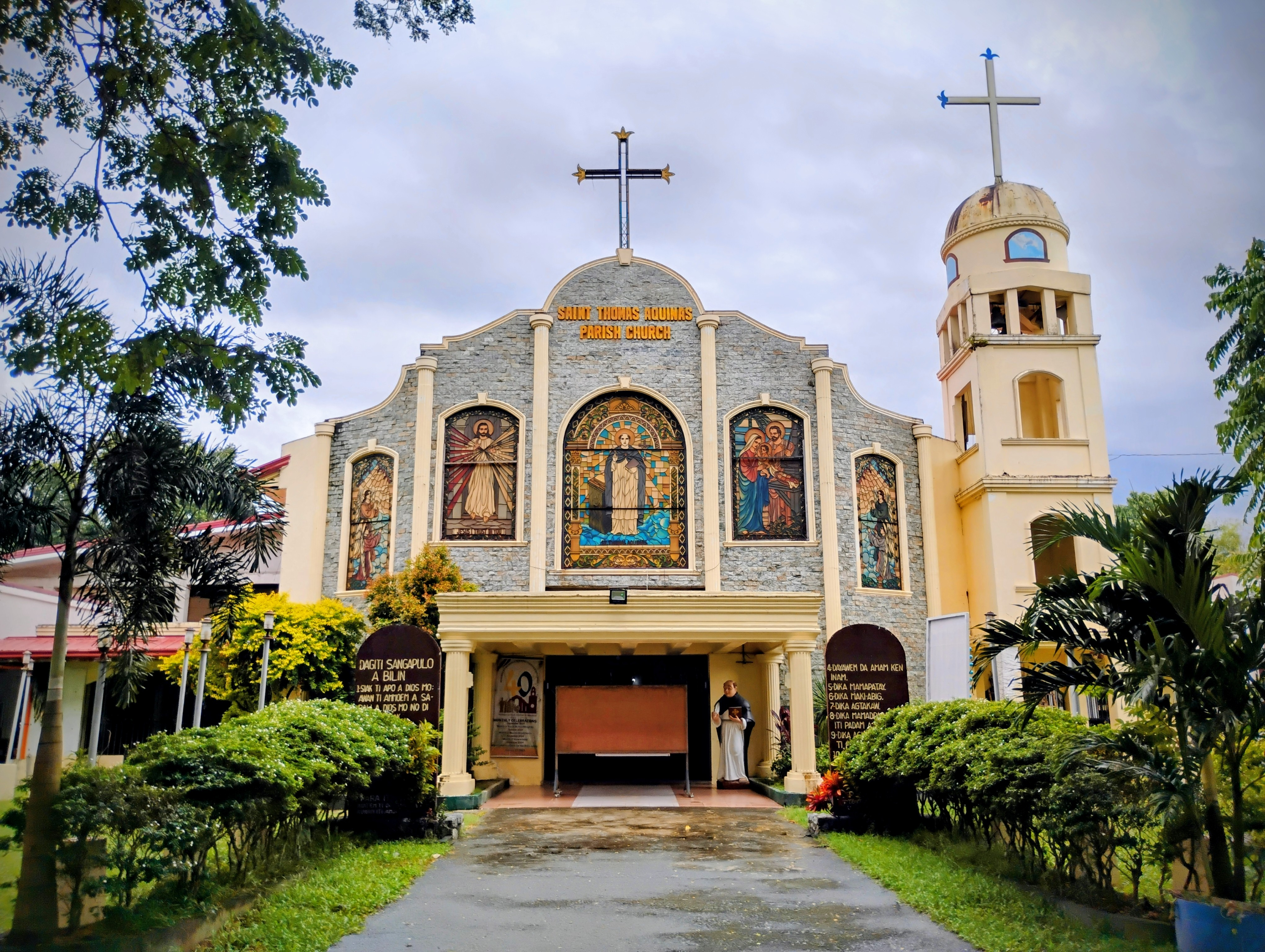
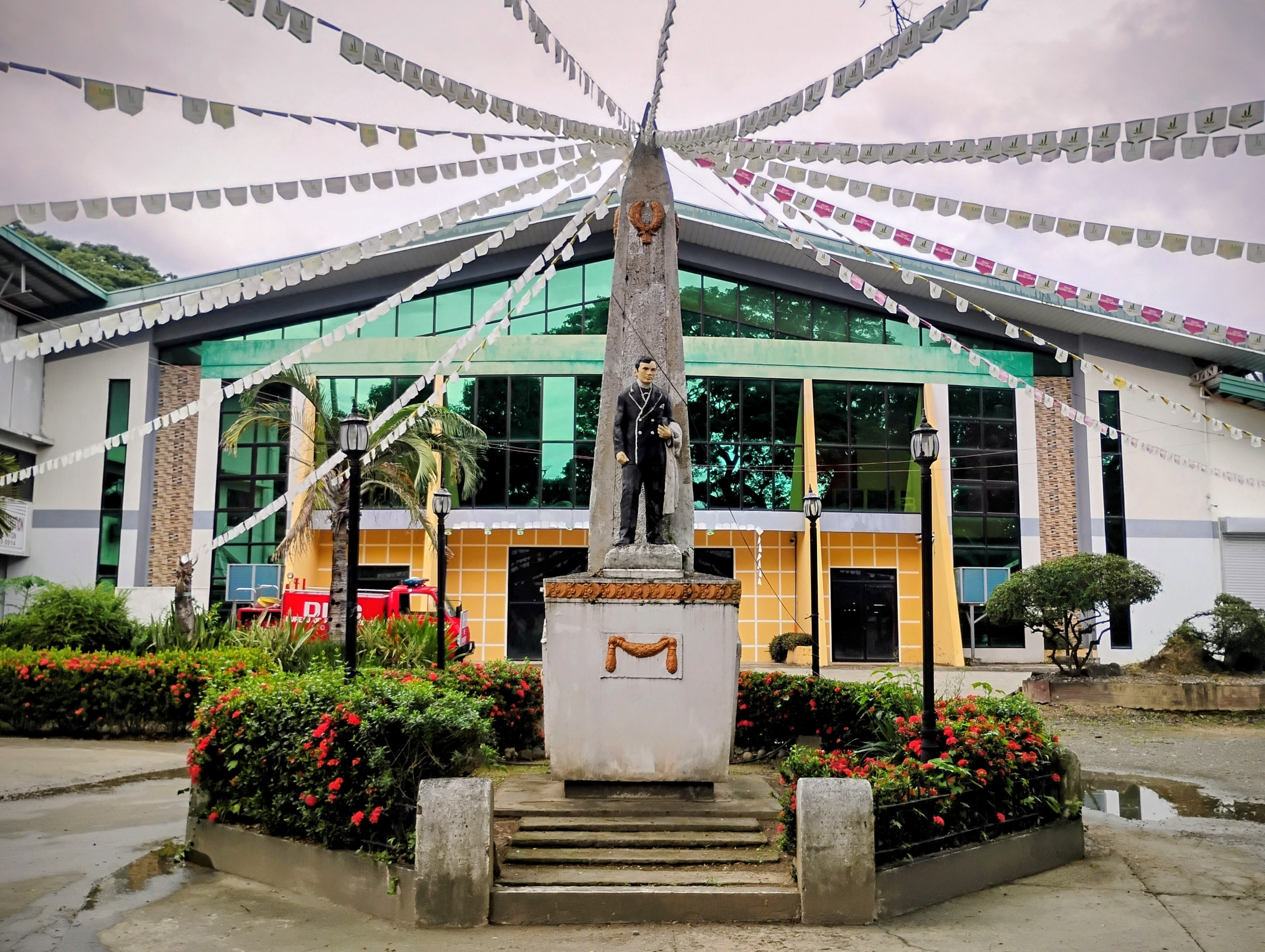
- Santo Tomas Municipal Hall Saint Thomas Aquinas Parish Church Santo Tomas Auditorium

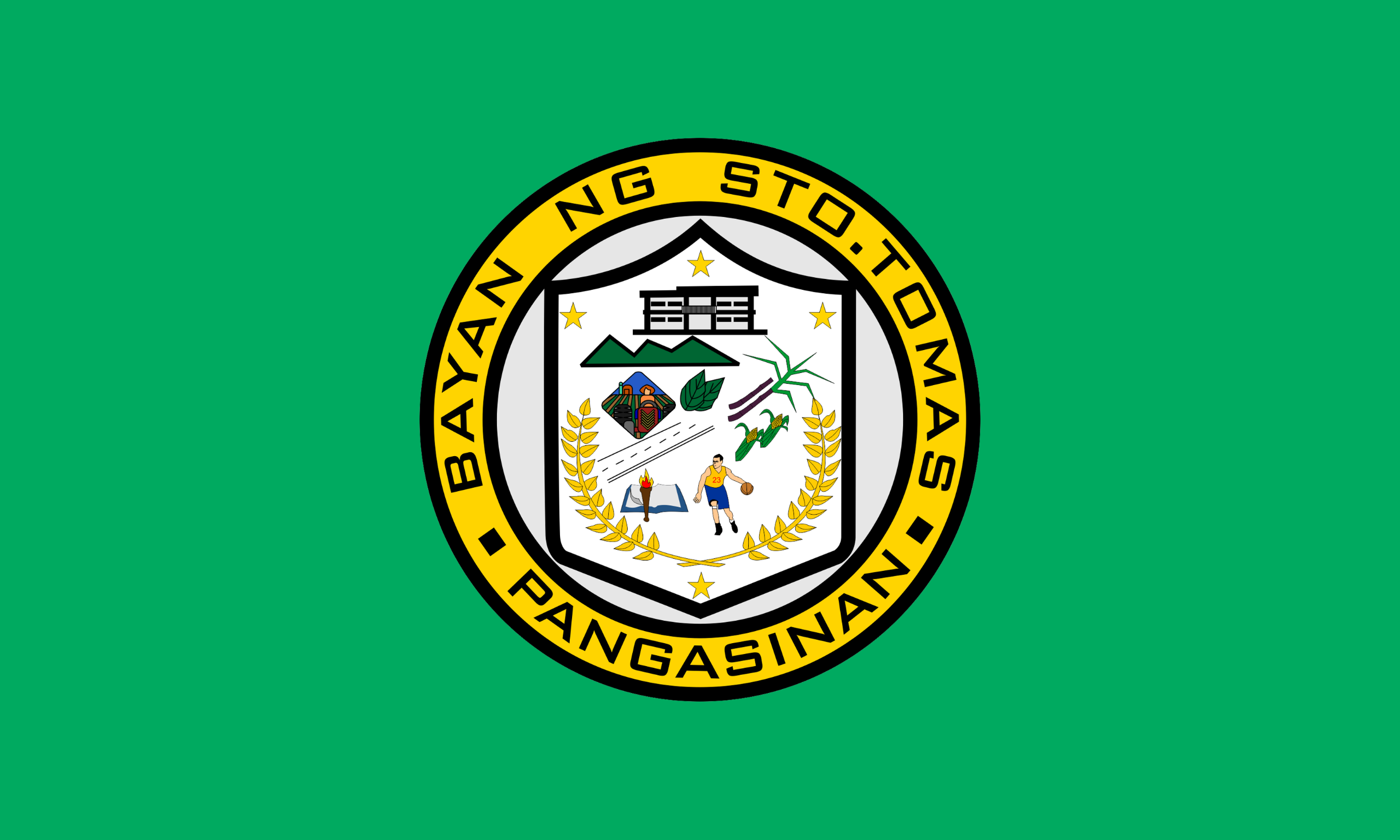
- Flag Seal

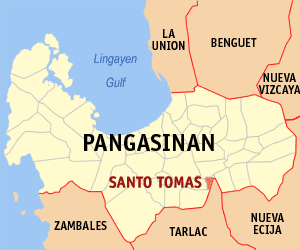
- Map of Pangasinan with Santo Tomas highlighted
- Interactive map of Santo Tomas
- Location within the Philippines
- Coordinates: 15°52′45″N 120°35′18″E
- Country: Philippines
- Region: Ilocos Region
- Province: Pangasinan
- District: 5th district
- Founded: February 10, 1908
- Named for: St. Thomas Aquinas
- Barangays: 10 (see Barangays)

Government
  - Type: Sangguniang Bayan
  - Mayor: Dickerson D. Villar
  - Vice Mayor: Timoteo S. Villar III
  - Representative: Ramon V. Guico III
  - Municipal Council: Members: Jonathan Castañaga; Jenny Toquero; Ely Ramos; Heidiliz Ordoño; Gwin Pescador; Robert Bravo; Benigno Pasig, Jr.; Mary Jane Saavedra
  - Electorate: 9,945 voters (2025)

Area
  - Total: 12.99 km^{2} (5.02 sq mi)
- Elevation: 28 m (92 ft)
- Highest elevation: 45 m (148 ft)
- Lowest elevation: 19 m (62 ft)

Population (2024 census)
  - Total: 14,894
  - Density: 1,147/km^{2} (2,970/sq mi)
  - Households: 3,816

Economy
  - Income class: 4th municipal income class
  - Poverty incidence: 11.86% (2023)
  - Revenue: ₱ 104.1 million (2024)
  - Assets: ₱ 312.3 million (2024)
  - Expenditure: ₱ 96.67 million (2024)
  - Liabilities: ₱ 32.13 million (2024)

Service provider
  - Electricity: Pangasinan 3 Electric Cooperative (PANELCO 3)
- Time zone: UTC+8 (PST)
- ZIP code: 2426
- PSGC: 0105540000
- IDD : area code: +63 (0)75
- Native languages: Pangasinan; Ilocano; Tagalog

Santo Tomas, officially the Municipality of Santo Tomas (Pangasinan: Baley na Santo Tomas; Ilocano: Ili ti Santo Tomas; Tagalog: Bayan ng Santo Tomas), is a municipality in the province of Pangasinan, Philippines. According to the 2024 census, it has a population of 14,894 people, making it the least populated municipality in the province.

== Geography ==
Santo Tomas is situated 53.64 kilometers (33.33 mi) from the provincial capital Lingayen, and 174.98 kilometers (108.73 mi) from the country's capital city of Manila.

=== Barangays ===
Santo Tomas is politically subdivided into 10 barangays. Each barangay consists of puroks and some have sitios.

- La Luna
- Poblacion East
- Poblacion West
- Salvacion
- San Agustin
- San Antonio
- San Jose
- San Marcos
- Santo Domingo
- Santo Niño

=== Climate ===
Climate data for Santo Tomas, Pangasinan
Month	Jan	Feb	Mar	Apr	May	Jun	Jul	Aug	Sep	Oct	Nov	Dec	Year
Mean daily maximum °C (°F)	31 (88)	31 (88)	32 (90)	34 (93)	35 (95)	34 (93)	32 (90)	32 (90)	32 (90)	32 (90)	32 (90)	31 (88)	32 (90)
Mean daily minimum °C (°F)	22 (72)	22 (72)	22 (72)	24 (75)	24 (75)	24 (75)	24 (75)	24 (75)	24 (75)	23 (73)	23 (73)	22 (72)	23 (74)
Average precipitation mm (inches)	13.6 (0.54)	10.4 (0.41)	18.2 (0.72)	15.7 (0.62)	178.4 (7.02)	227.9 (8.97)	368 (14.5)	306.6 (12.07)	310.6 (12.23)	215.7 (8.49)	70.3 (2.77)	31.1 (1.22)	1,766.5 (69.56)
Average rainy days	3	2	2	4	14	16	23	21	24	15	10	6	140
Source: World Weather Online

== Demographics ==
Population census of Santo Tomas
Year	Pop.	±% p.a.
1903	3,085	—
1918	2,760	−0.74%
1939	3,147	+0.63%
1948	4,294	+3.51%
1960	5,235	+1.66%
1970	7,562	+3.74%
1975	8,615	+2.65%
1980	8,946	+0.76%
1990	10,253	+1.37%
1995	11,397	+2.00%
2000	12,304	+1.66%
2007	13,706	+1.50%
2010	14,406	+1.83%
2015	15,022	+0.80%
2020	14,878	−0.20%
2024	14,894	+0.03%
Source: Philippine Statistics Authority

=== Religion ===
==== St. Thomas Aquinas Parish Church ====
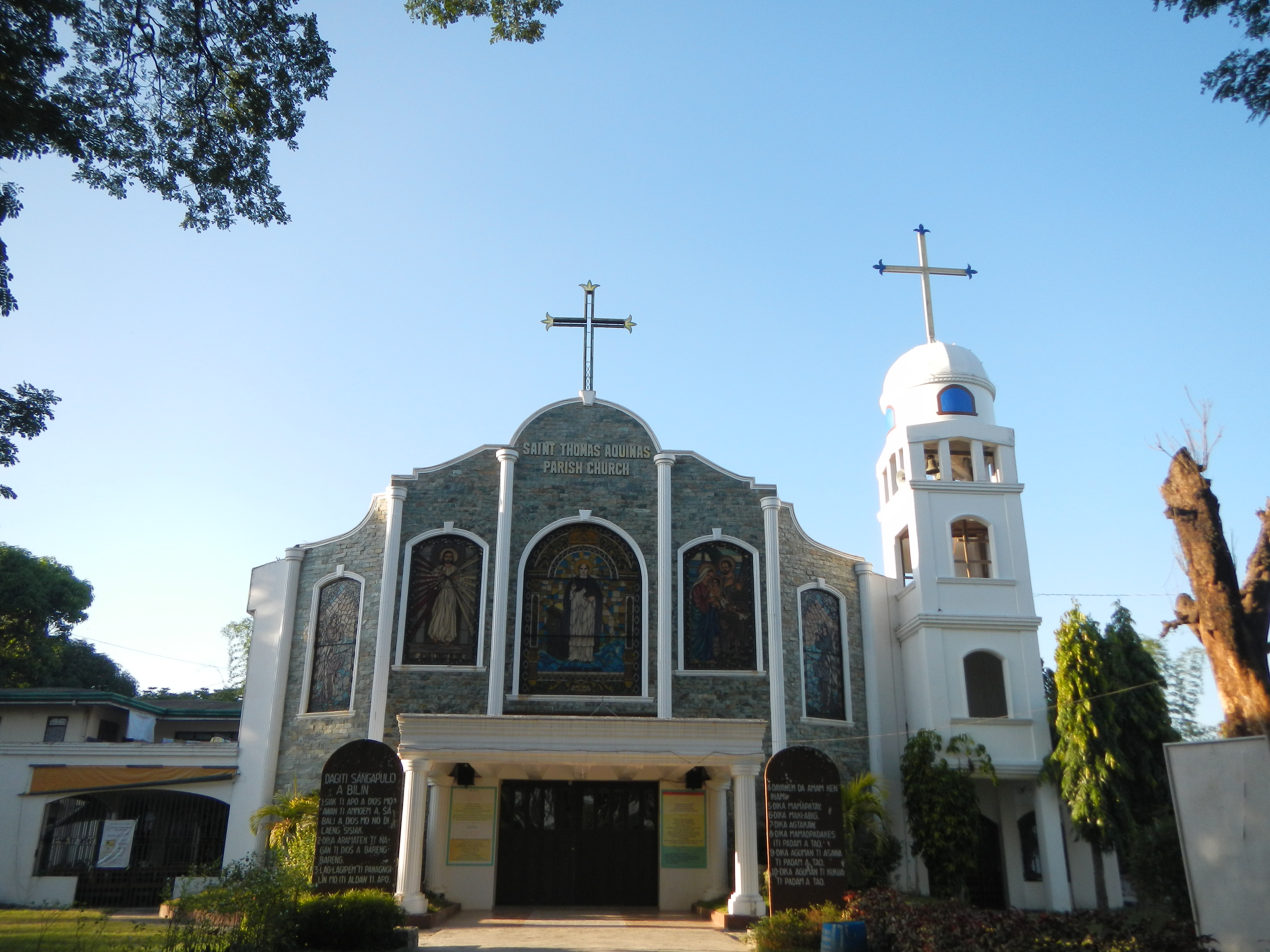
St. Thomas Aquinas Parish Church

The 1973 St. Thomas Aquinas Parish (F-1973) Church (Barangay Santo Domingo) is under the Roman Catholic Diocese of Urdaneta and the Vicariate of Sacred Heart (Vicar Forane is Father Hurley John S. Solfelix). Its Feast Day is January 28, the same feast day of the Church's patron and the town's patron, St. Thomas Aquinas. The current Parish Priest as of 2024 is Father Joseph Repollo. As a parish, Santo Tomas was erected on March 15, 1974, by Archbishop Federico Limon consecrated the Church on March 15, 1974, since before, Santo Tomas Church was merely a "visita” or chapel of Alcala, Pangasinan, while the town was a barrio of Alcala (from 1898 until the 1901 fusion with Alcala), with former name of Arango (“inarang”, fresh water shells at Agno River).

Before 1898, Santo Tomas was a barrio of Alcala. Arango was its name as a barrio, Such a name derived from “inarang”, a name given to the fresh water shells which abound near the bank of the Agno river. Santo Tomas was recreated as a town in 1908.

== Economy ==
Poverty incidence of Santo Tomas (%)

Source: Philippine Statistics Authority

The town's principal products are palay, yellow corn, coconut, tobacco, poultry and livestock.

== Government ==
=== Local government ===
Santo Tomas is part of the fifth congressional district of the province of Pangasinan. It is governed by a mayor, designated as its local chief executive, and by a municipal council as its legislative body in accordance with the Local Government Code. The mayor, vice mayor, and the councilors are elected directly by the people through an election which is being held every three years.

=== Elected officials ===
Members of the Municipal Council (2019–2022)
Position	Name
Congressman	Ramon V. Guico III
Mayor	Timoteo S. Villar III
Vice-Mayor	Wilfredo M. Pescador
Councilors	Jerry P. Marquez
Councilors	Leonora S. Zarasate
Councilors	Dickerson D. Villar
Councilors	Jonathan Q. Castañaga
Councilors	Mary Jane V. Saavedra
Councilors	Garry V. Coloma
Councilors	Nela N. Mariñas
Councilors	Heidiliz S. Ordoño

== Guinness World Records ==
On February 11, 2008, during the first Corn Festival of the centennial celebration, Santo Tomas was awarded by the Guinness World Records certificate for the longest barbecue (3,803.96 meters (12,480.2 ft)). Residents grilled 93,540 glutinous corn on the 1,559 meters (5,115 ft) long grills (each interconnected grill measured 2.4 meters), traversing its 10 barangays. Santo Tomas' longest barbecue record beat the previous record of 1,493.2 meters (4,899 ft) set in Montevideo, Uruguay (grilled red meat).

On February 11, 2009, Santo Tomas' 2nd Corn Festival's 200-meter (stretch of the street) corn grill was held for its 101st founding anniversary. at it previously held its 2007 Santo Tomas Corn Festival.

In the "Agew na Pangasinan 2012 Street Dancers Showdown", April 11, 2012 Pangasinan Day amid the Float Parade and Street Dancing Contest, Santo Tomas Street Dancers demonstrated their Guinness entry: “the biggest grill in the world”. On the 2012 Corn Festival, March 26, Santo Tomas, Pangasinan grilled 6,000 ears of corn for the town's 103rd founding anniversary yesterday.

== Education ==
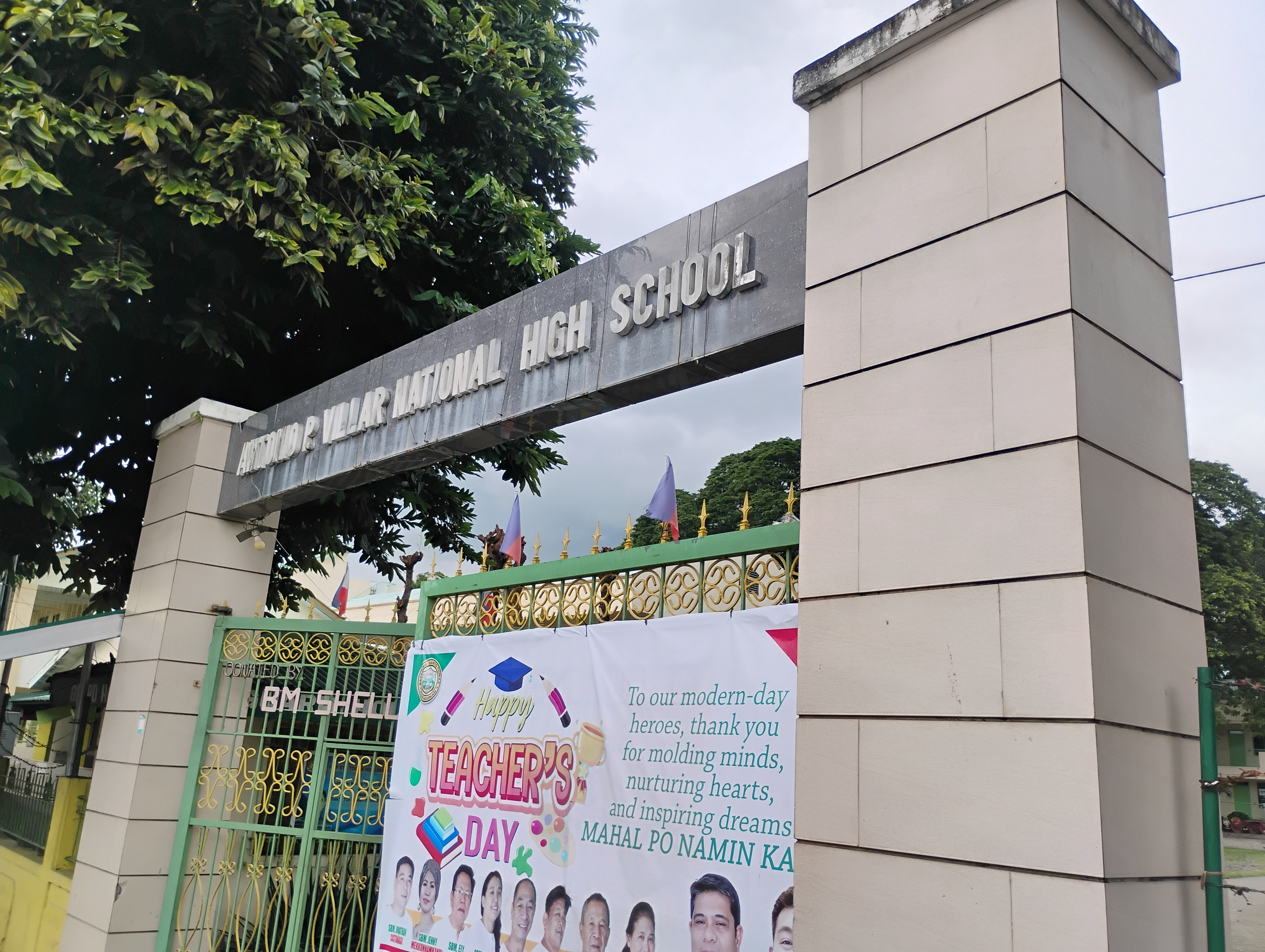
Antonio P. Villar National High School

The Sto. Tomas Schools District Office governs all educational institutions within the municipality. It oversees the management and operations of all private and public, from primary to secondary schools.

=== Primary and elementary schools ===
- Doña Aurea Elementary School
- Ernesting Gonzalez Central School
- Salvacion Elementary School
- San Jose Elementary School

=== Secondary schools ===
- Antonio P. Villar National High School
- San Antonio National High School

== Gallery ==
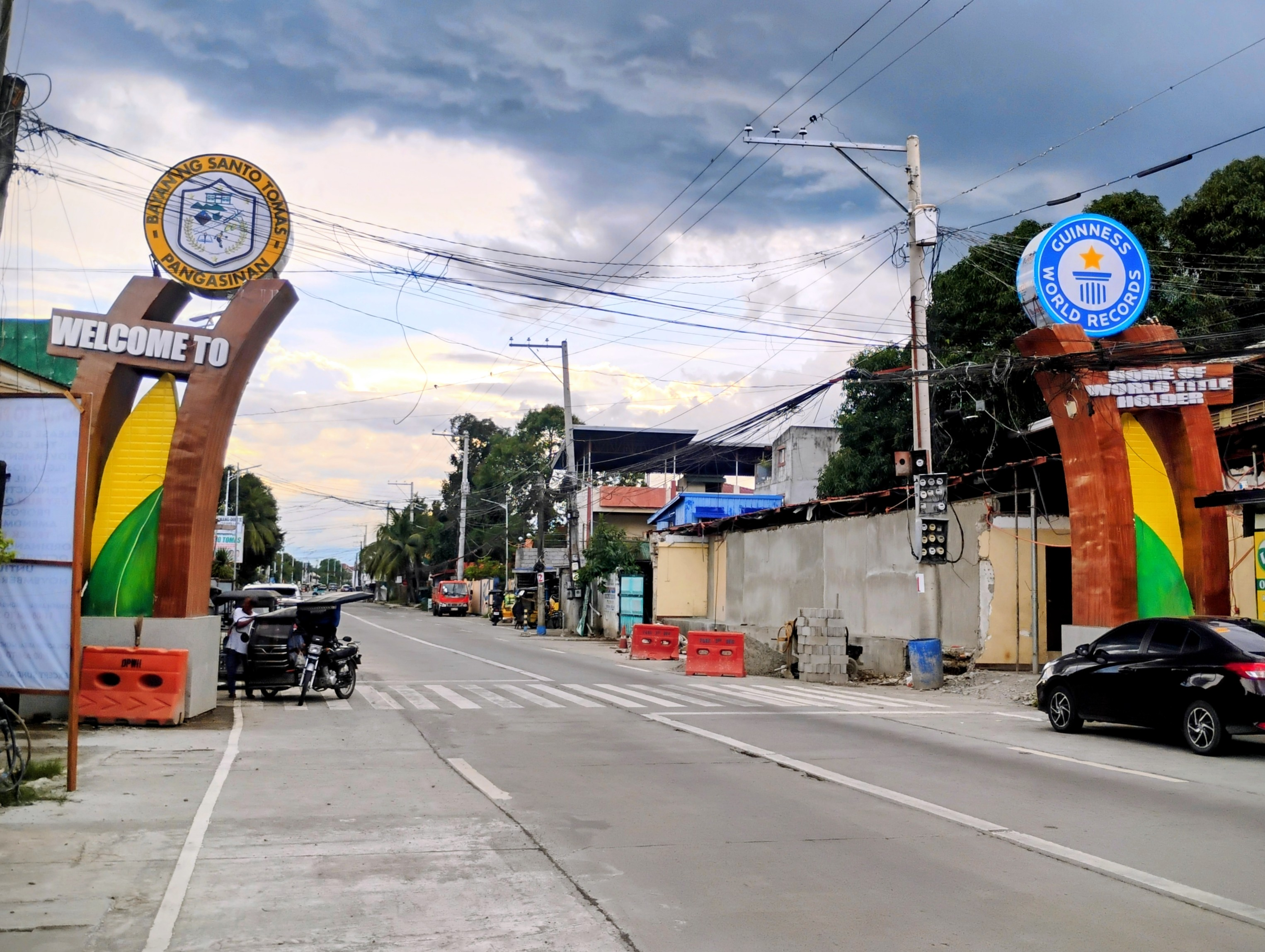
Santo Tomas Welcome Arch from Rosales, Pangasinan

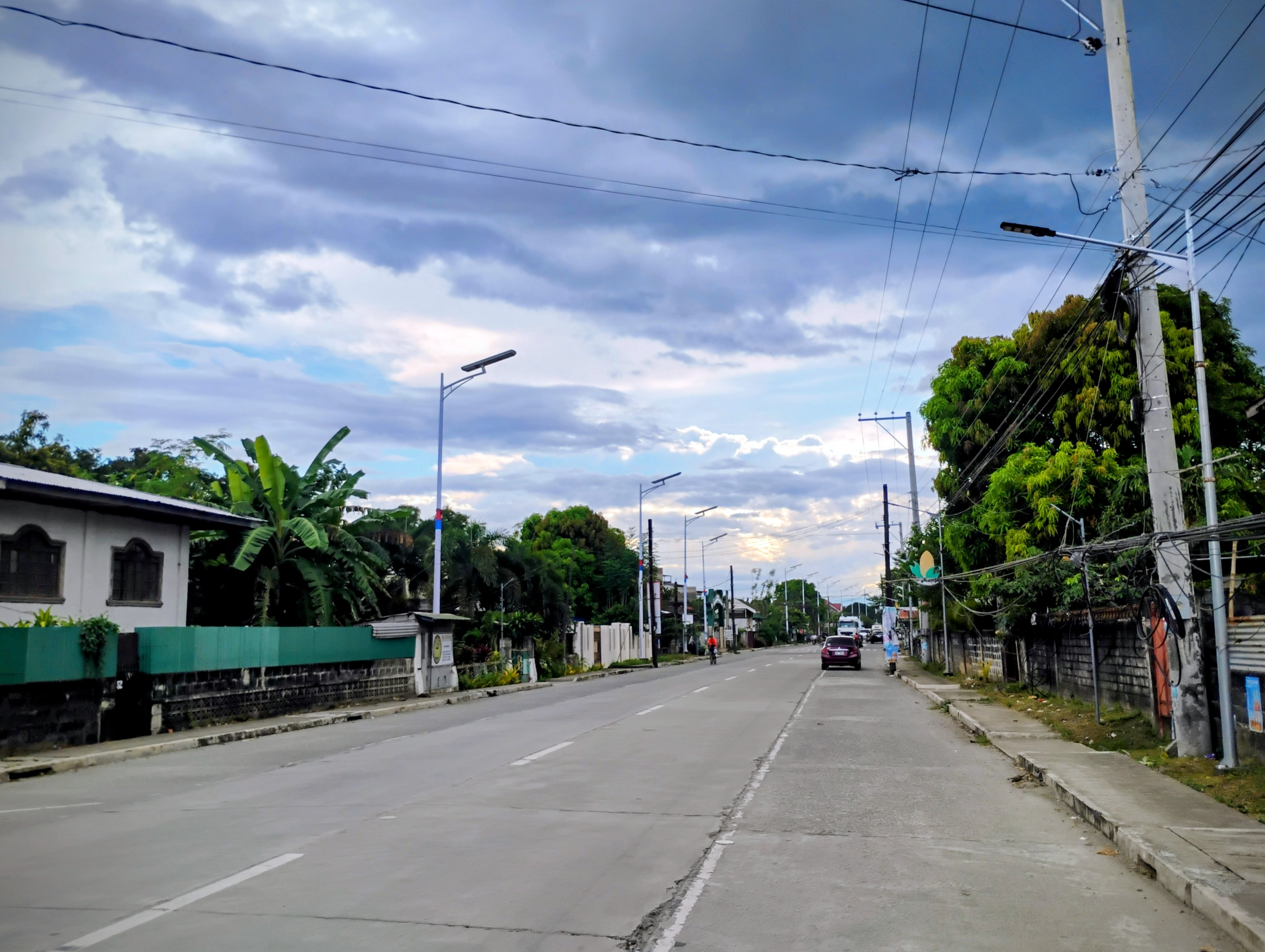
Carmen-Alcala Road

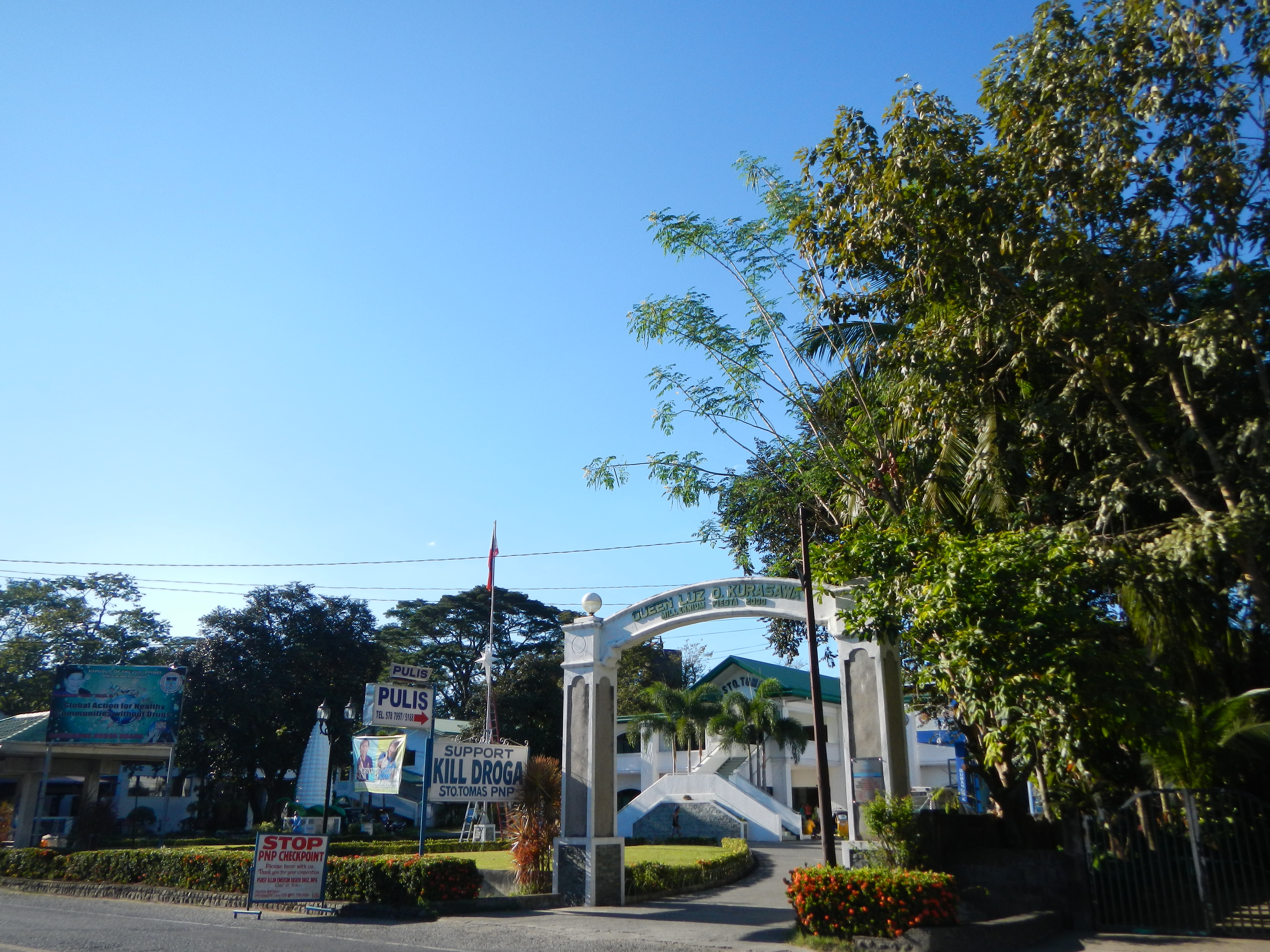
Gate of the Town Hall

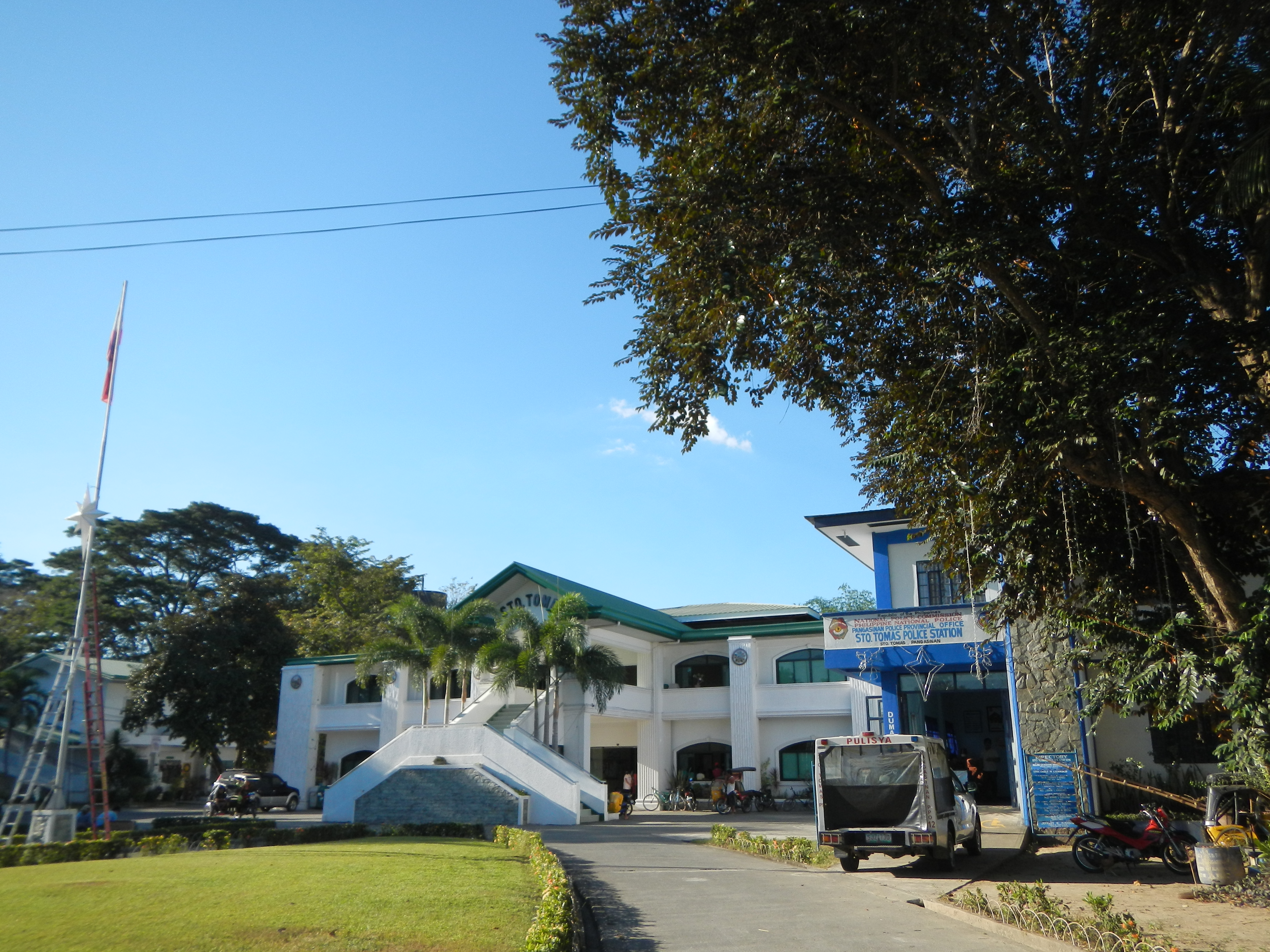
Santo Tomas Town Hall (Municipio)

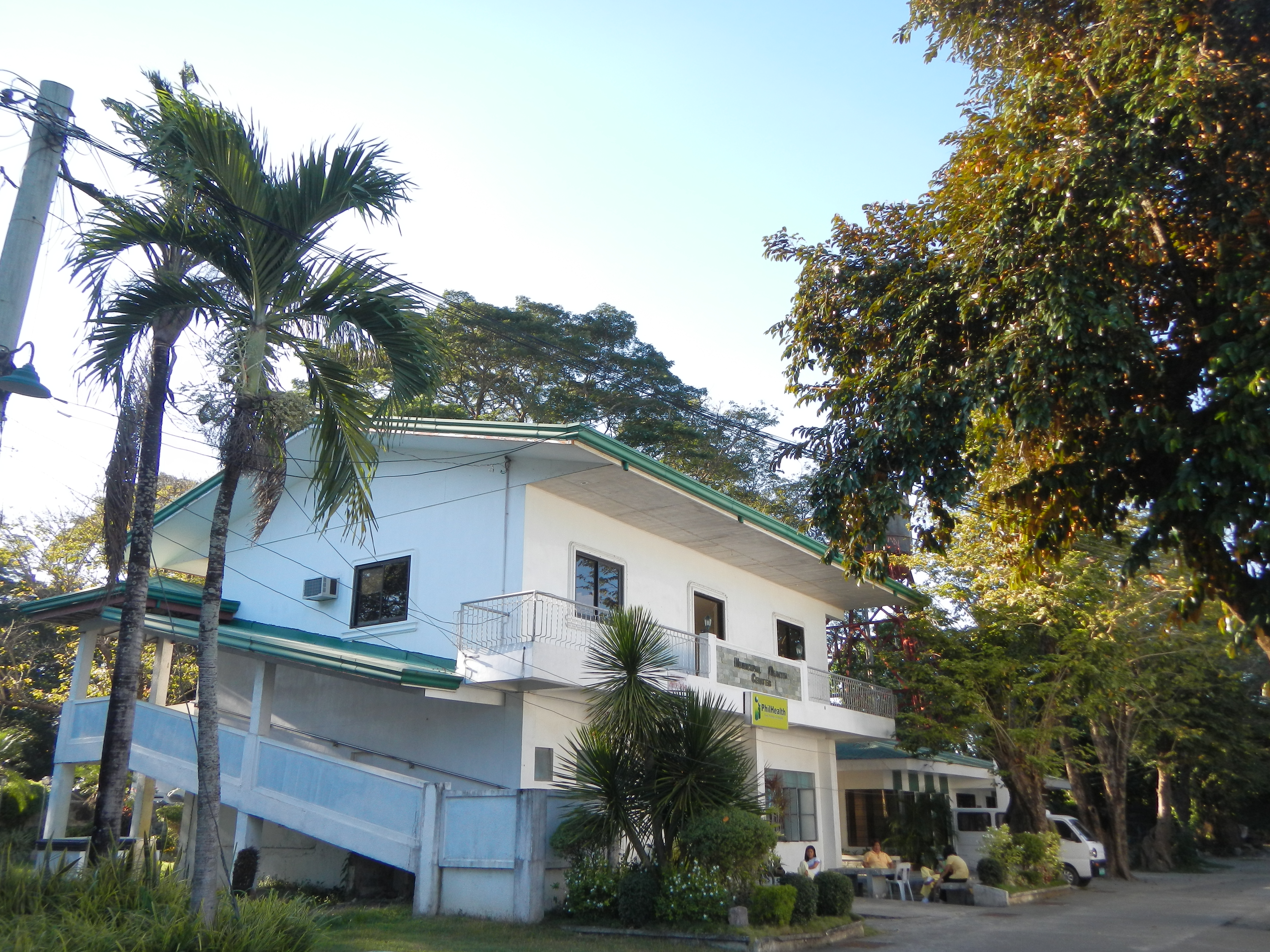
Health Center

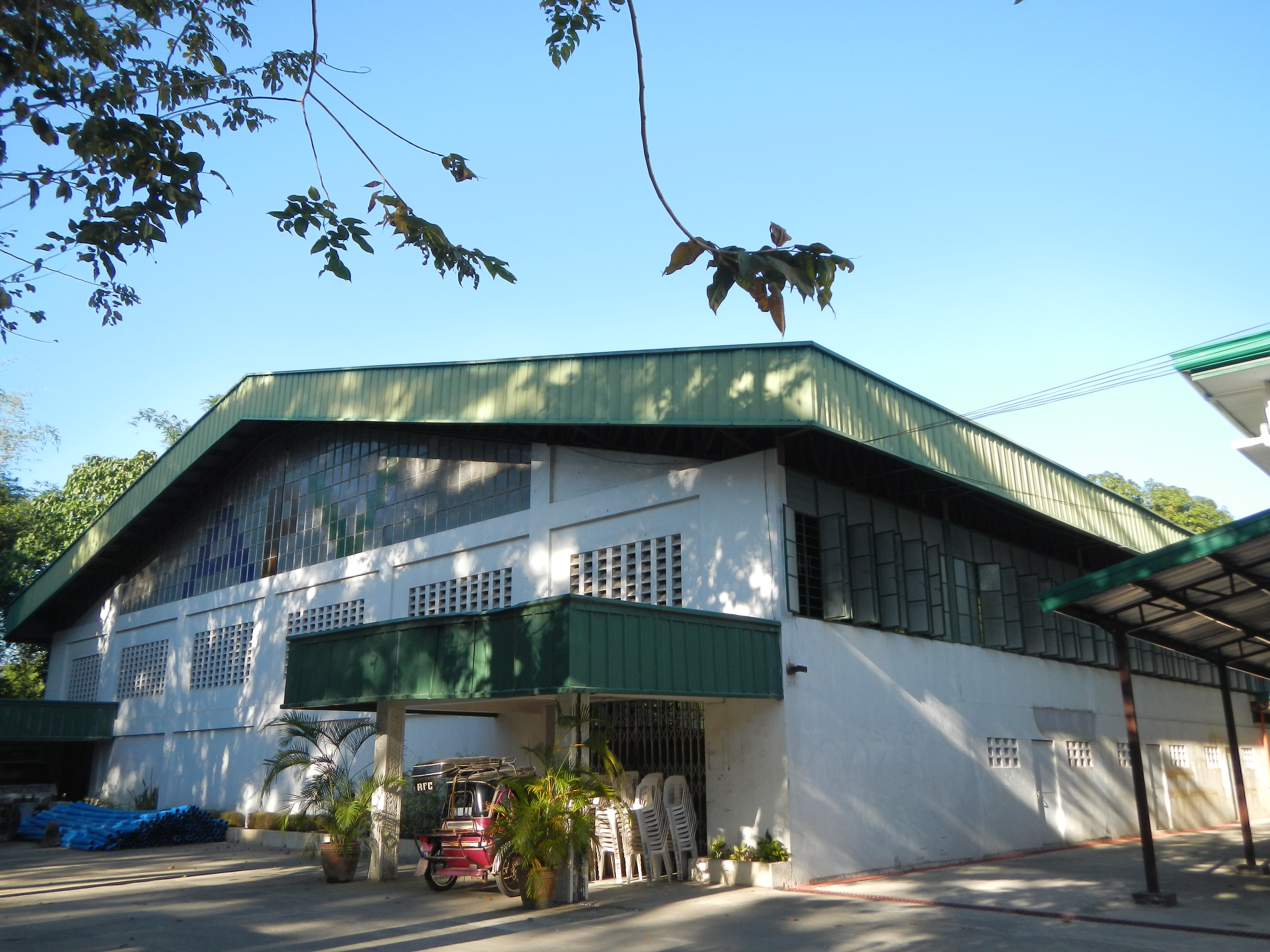
Santo Tomas Gymnasium

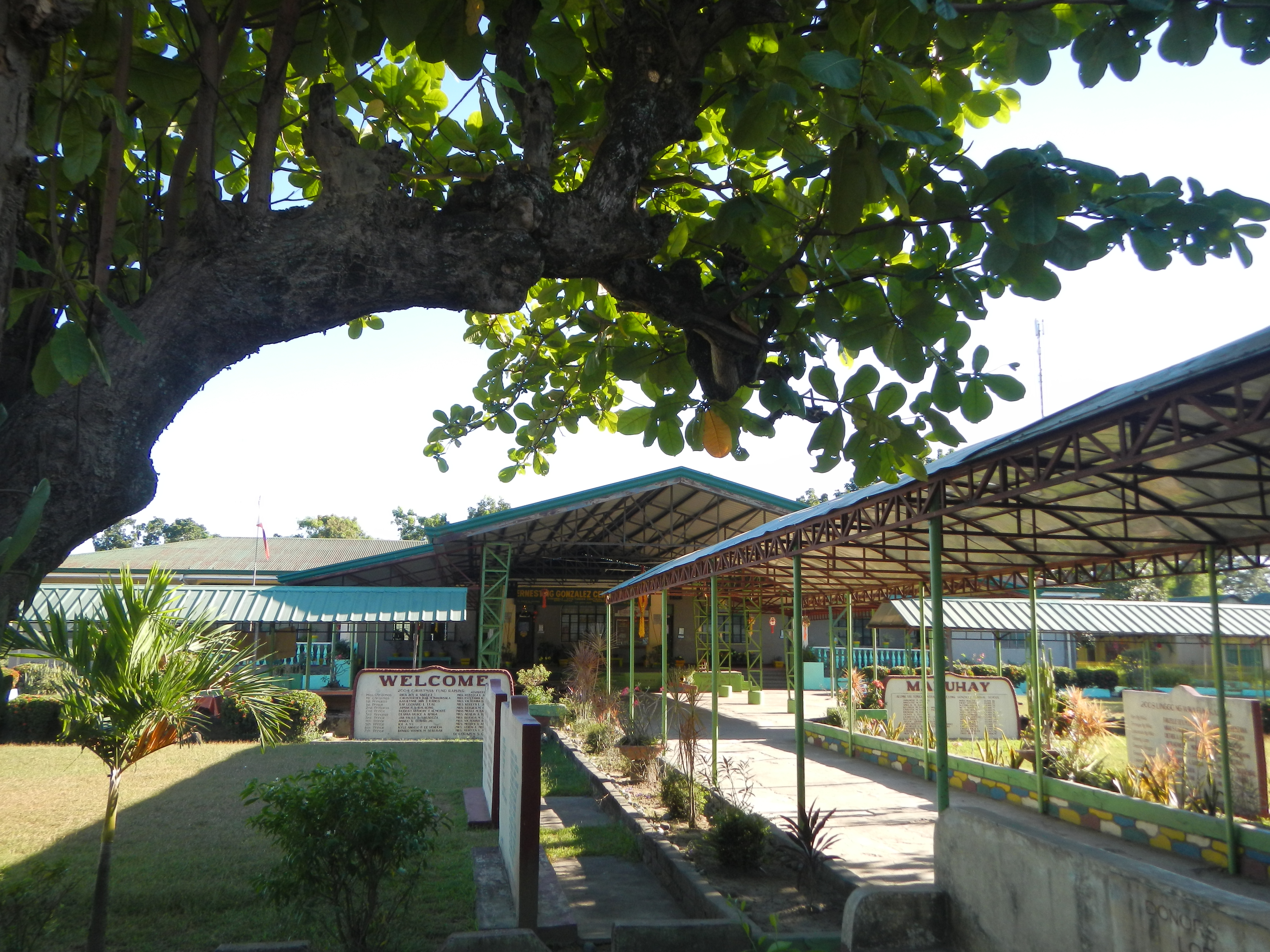
Santo Tomas Elementary School (in front of the Town Hall)
