= Saint Joseph the Patriarch Parish Church (Aguilar) =

Roman Catholic church in Pangasinan, Philippines

Aguilar Church
- Saint Joseph the Patriarch Parish Church
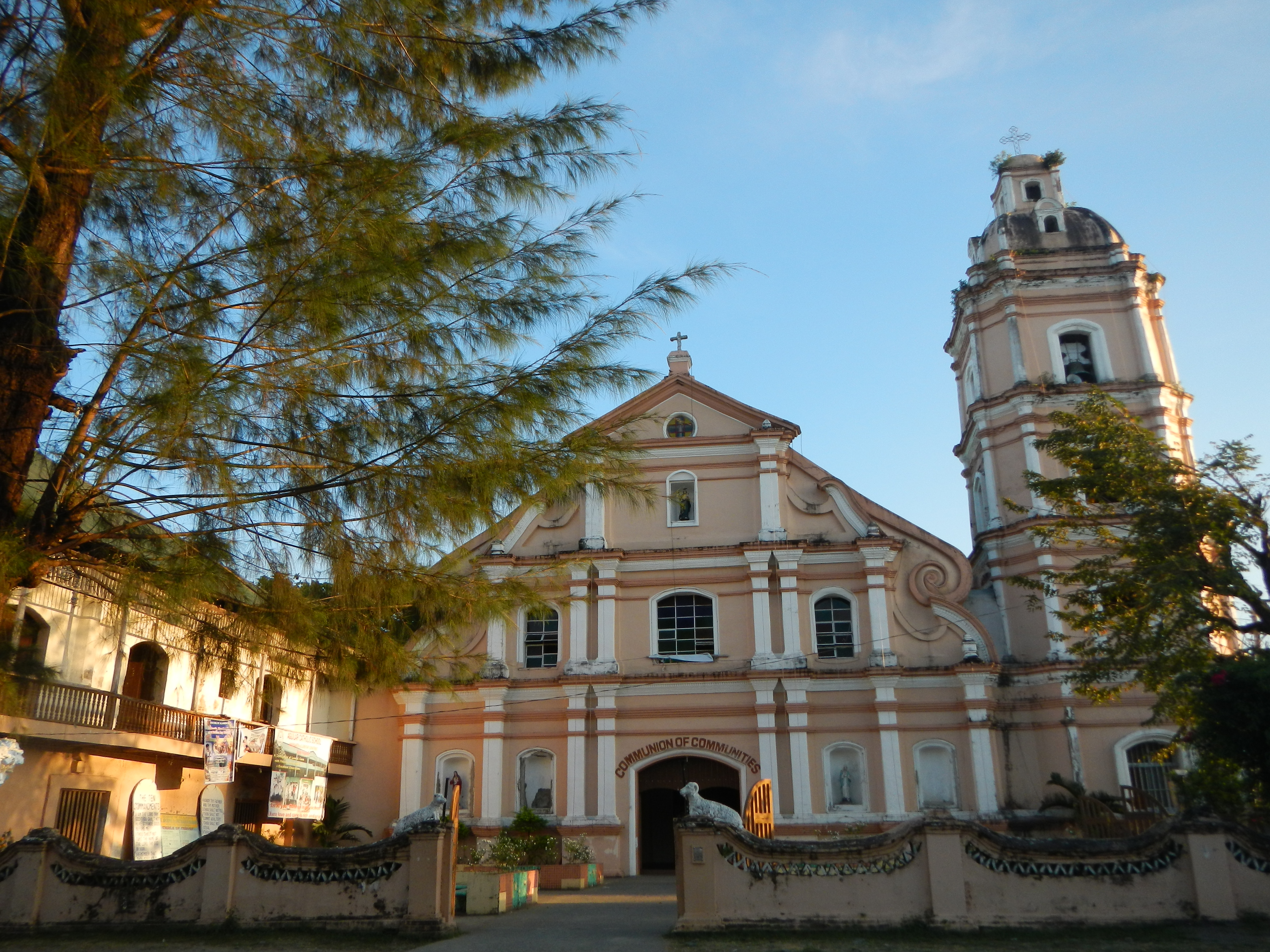
- Church façade in 2012

- Location in Luzon Location in the Philippines
- 15°53′18″N 120°14′20″E
- Location: Romulo Highway corner Gallego Street, Aguilar, Pangasinan
- Country: Philippines
- Denomination: Roman Catholic

History
- Status: Parish church
- Founded: 1809
- Dedication: Saint Joseph the Patriarch

Architecture
- Functional status: Active
- Architect: Administered by Fr. Bernardo Pons
- Architectural type: Church building
- Style: Baroque architecture
- Groundbreaking: 1853
- Completed: 1854

Administration
- Archdiocese: Lingayen-Dagupan
- Diocese: Alaminos

Clergy
- Archbishop: Socrates B. Villegas
- Bishop: Ricardo L. Baccay
- Priest: Jeremiah Ofo-ob

Saint Joseph the Patriarch Parish Church, commonly known as Aguilar Church, is a Baroque Roman Catholic church in the municipality of Aguilar in Pangasinan, Philippines. The parish was established in 1808 under the Archdiocese of Nueva Segovia. It was transferred to then newly created Diocese of Lingayen-Dagupan on May 19, 1928, and to the Diocese of Alaminos on June 28, 1985.

== History ==
The creation of the settlement as a parish did not accompany its founding as a municipality. Aguilar did not have its own resident priest at once. It awaited the availability of Dominican personnel; pending the arrival of its own Parish Priest, Fr. Juan Vela of the Parish of Salasa, took care of the town's pastoral needs. It was through the efforts of Fr. Vela that the first convent of Aguilar was built. Fr. Juan Vela did not stay long in Aguilar because the inhabitants promised to contribute to make up the difference between 500 401 tribute in order to have their own curate. In 1808, it was finally granted spiritual independence when it was assigned its own Parish Priest in the person of Fr. Bernardo Torre.

It was through the effort of Fr. Bernardo Torre that the first church of Aguilar was built. However, the construction of the more enduring concrete church and tower was begun by Fr. Benito Sanchez Fraga in 1846. The concrete church was the first to be finished. It was solemnly blessed on July 4, 1853. The church tower was completed much later in 1875 during the tenure of Fr. Juan Cordova.

During the 3-year stay of Fr. Vicente Ystigui as the curate of Aguilar (1872–1874), he built a concrete school for young women (1872), he built a brick wall around the Catholic cemetery (1873) and he constructed the High altar of the church (1874).

The parish of St. Joseph the Patriarch in Aguilar belonged to the Diocese of Nueva Segovia from its foundation as a parish in 1808, until May 19, 1928, when the Diocese of Lingayen was created with Bishop Leon Maria Guerrero as the first Bishop. On June 28, 1985, the parish was transferred to the newly created Diocese of Alaminos, with Bishop Jesus A. Cabrera as the first bishop.

=== Architectural history ===
Father Juan Vila of the Parish of Salasa (now Bugallon) supervised the construction of a temporary church and a convent which were finished in two years. In 1808, the curate was granted with spiritual independence. In 1809, Father Bernardo Pons began the construction of the concrete church. Father Juan A. del Manzano laid the foundation of the present convent in 1832 which was continued by Father Nicolas Fuentes. The convent was finished during the term of Father Benito Sanchez Fraga. He later laid down the foundation of the present church and bell tower in 1846. The church was blessed on July 4, 1853. The bell tower was completed in 1875. Initial construction began by Father Fraga was monitored by Father Ramon Dalmau and Father Francisco Treserra. The church and convent was finished during Father Pedro Villanova's term and was inaugurated on June 4, 1854. Father Lucio Asensio started to build the choir loft and the sacristy; in 1859, he started the ceiling work of the church, with the help of master carpenter Cenon. From 1866 to 1878, Father Agustin Gallego painted the church, built the main altar and the ceiling, and finished the construction of the bell tower. Two bells were bought for the church, during 1866 and 1877. The ceiling was completed in 1867. In 1879, Father Victoriano Garcia Cianothe ordered the roofing of the church to be changed from nipa shingles into galvanized iron roofing. Father Victor Herrero repaired the bell tower which was destroyed by the earthquake of 1892.

== Architectural features ==
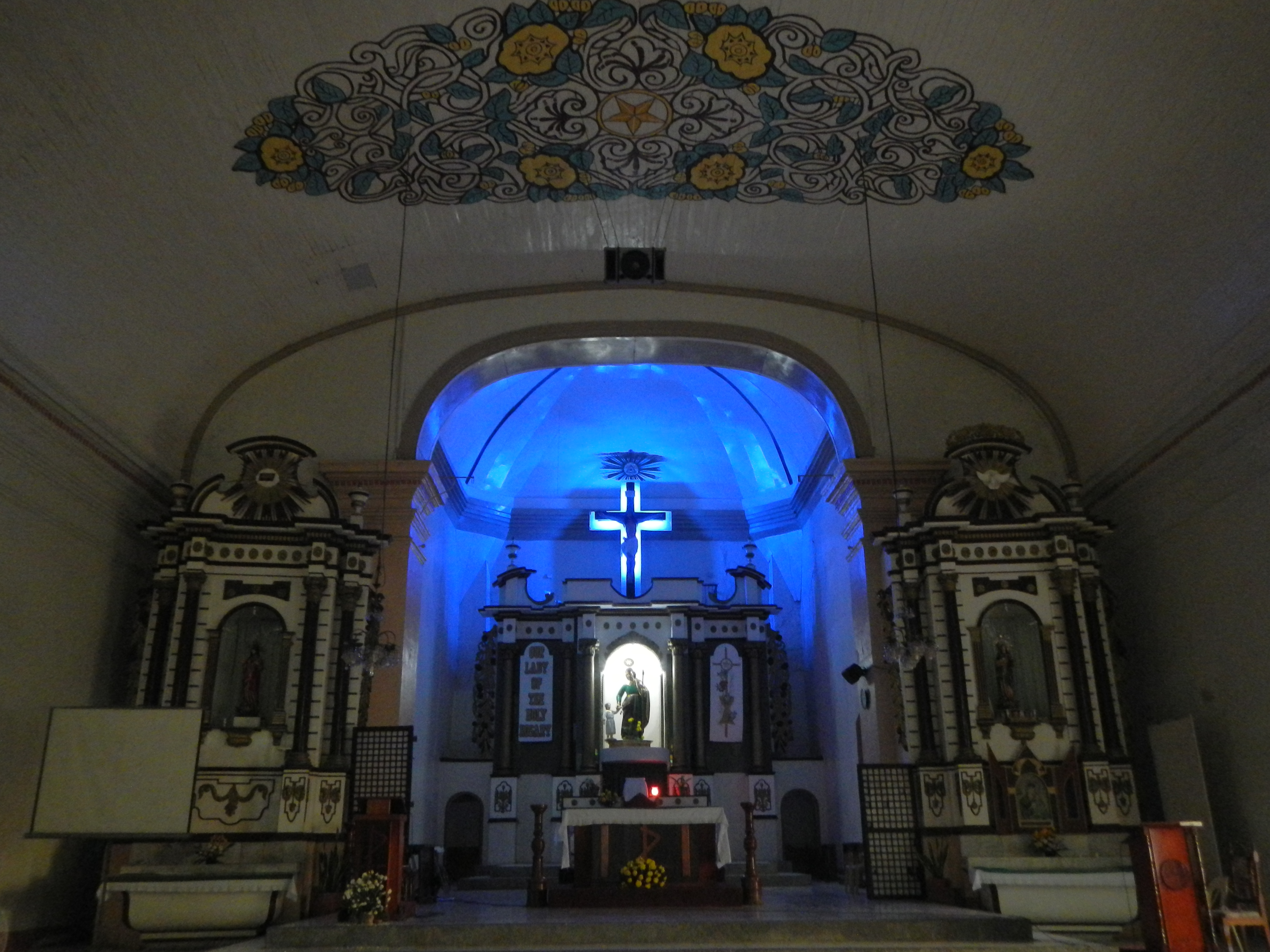
Church altar in 2012

The church reflects the Baroque architectural style. The church was made distinct by a large volute sloping down from the pediment to the second level – giving an impression of a huge triangular pediment with the first level forming as the entablature. Super-positioned columns alternate with depressed three-centered arched door and windows.

The church's complex also consists of a concrete school for young women, built in 1872, and a perimeter brick wall around a Catholic cemetery, built in 1873.
