= Our Lady of Lourdes Parish Church (Bugallon) =

Roman Catholic church in Pangasinan, Philippines

Salasa Church
- Our Lady of Lourdes Parish Diocesan Center for Marian Devotion
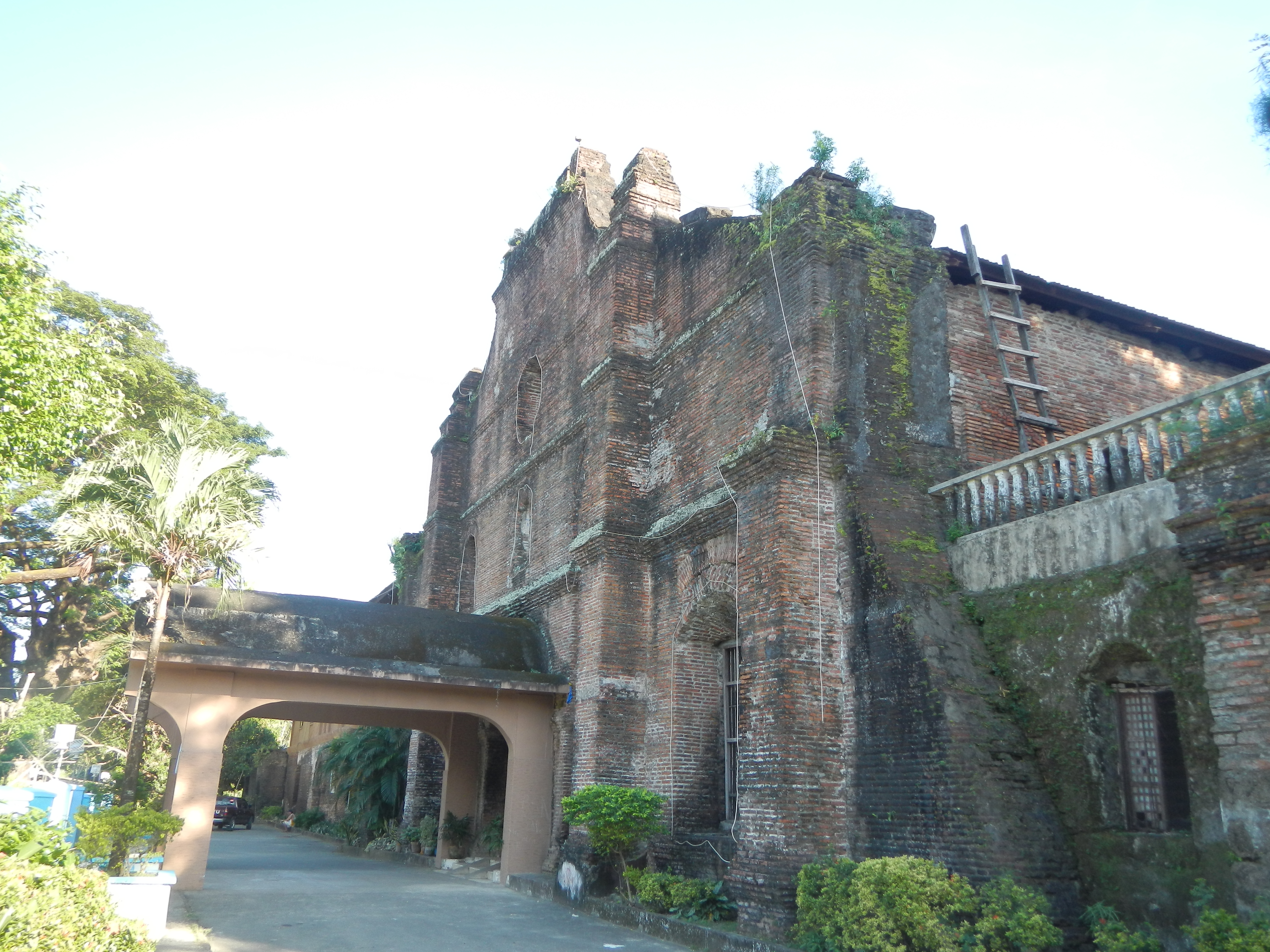
- A corner view of the church façade in 2012

- Location in Luzon Location in the Philippines
- 15°58′46″N 120°13′09″E
- Location: Bugallon, Pangasinan
- Country: Philippines
- Denomination: Roman Catholic

History
- Status: Parish church
- Dedication: Our Lady of Lourdes

Architecture
- Functional status: Active
- Architectural type: Church building
- Style: Spanish Colonial Revival architecture

Administration
- Archdiocese: Lingayen-Dagupan
- Diocese: Alaminos

Clergy
- Archbishop: Socrates B. Villegas
- Bishop: Sede vacante

Our Lady of Lourdes Parish Church, also known as Salasa Parish Church (or simply Salasa Church), is a Spanish colonial Roman Catholic church located in the municipality of Bugallon in Pangasinan, Philippines. The church is under the jurisdiction of the Diocese of Alaminos. Its feast day is celebrated every February 11.

== History ==
Father Antonio Perez founded the Salasa Parish in 1714 and built a church from 1720 up to 1733. With his efforts, the church was accepted as a Dominican Order vicariate. Father Francisco Barroso began the construction of the church in 1747 and finished the work in 1748. Fr. Juan Terres made repairs and renovations on the church from 1874 to 1885. In 1937, the church was opened under the Capuchin monks with Our Lady of Lourdes as their Patron. However, due to the Great Flood of 1953 caused by the overflowing of Agno River, the church suffered massive damages. Its roof, images, benches, liturgical objects were transferred to its present site in the barangay of Salasa except the two side altars and the Saint Andrew the Apostle statue at the façade, which remained at its location in the poblacion.

== Architectural features ==
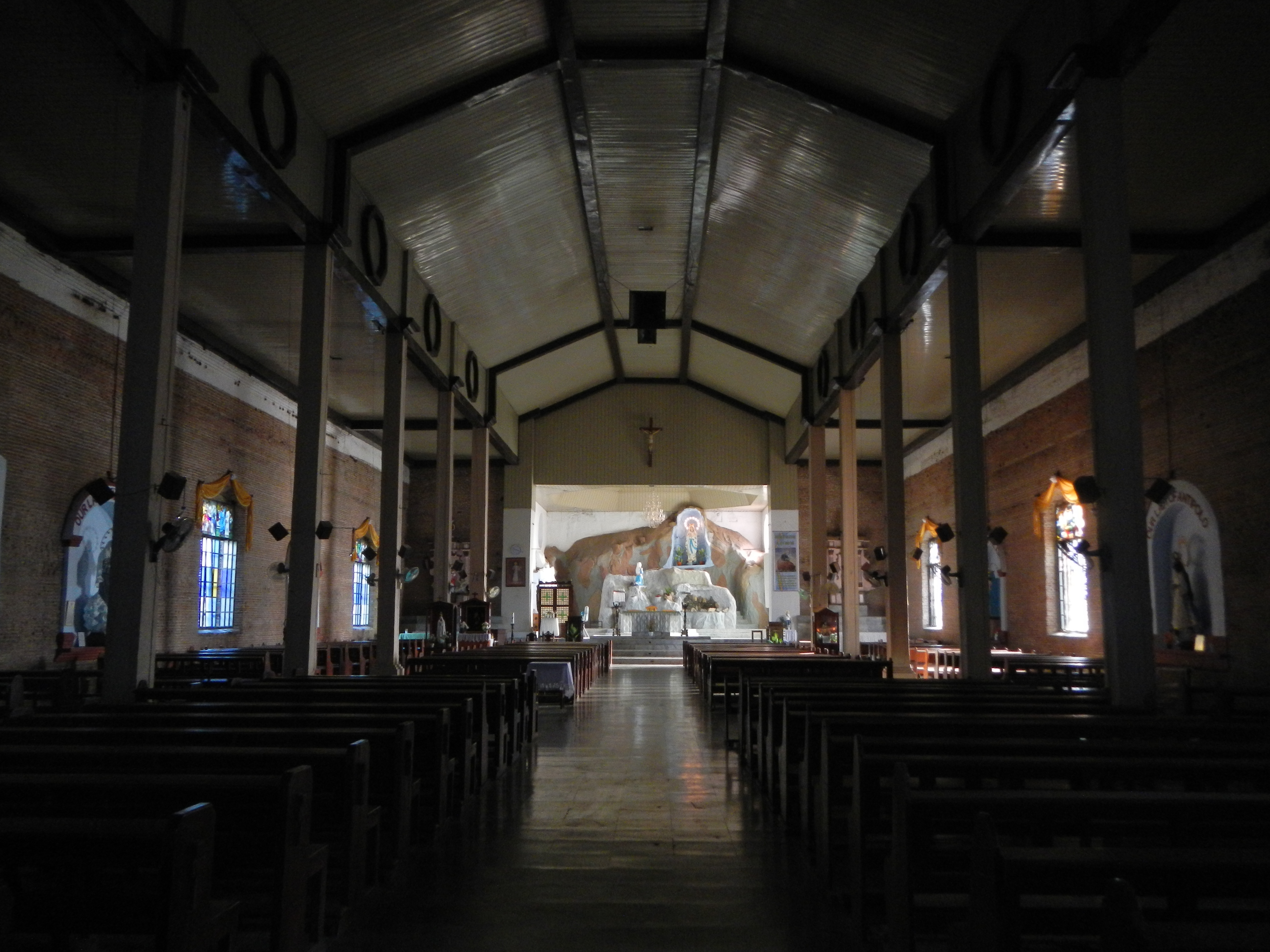
Church interior in 2012

The church reflects the Spanish Colonial Revival architectural style and measures 81 metres (266 ft) by 21.3 metres (70 ft). Its plastered brick facade was inspired by the Mexican style. The pediment is flat-topped and decorated with massive pinnacles. The octagonal window, together with the semicircular door and windows, accentuates the plastered finish wall. Its square pilasters, reaching up to the roof, are also decorated with pinnacles.
