= José Torres Bugallón =

Filipino military officer (1873–1899)

José Torres Bugallón y Gonzales
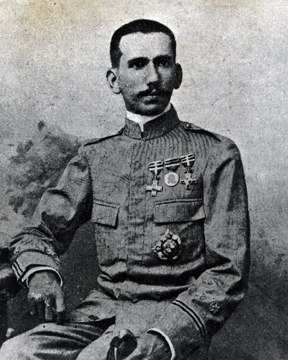
- Born: August 28, 1873; Salasa, Pangasinan, Captaincy General of the Philippines, Spanish Empire
- Died: February 4, 1899 (aged 25); Kalookan, Manila, First Philippine Republic
- Military career
- Allegiance: Philippine Republic; Spanish Empire
- Branch: Philippine Republican Army; Spanish Army
- Rank: lieutenant colonel second lieutenant
- Unit: 70th Infantry Regiment (Spanish)
- Conflicts: Philippine Revolution: Battle of Talisay (1897); Philippine–American War: Battle of La Loma
- Awards: Cruz Roja del Merito Militar (Red Cross for Military Honor)

José Torres Bugallón y Gonzales (August 28, 1873 – February 4, 1899) was a Filipino military officer who fought and served the Spanish government during the Philippine Revolution against the revolutionaries and joined the Philippine Revolutionary Army during the Philippine–American War. He is known as the "Hero of the Battle of La Loma", where he was fatally wounded that led to his death.

== Family background ==
Bugallón was born on August 28, 1873, in Salasa, Pangasinan. His father, José Asas Bugallón, came from Baliuag, Bulacan, while his mother was from the Gonzales family of Pangasinan.

== Education ==
After elementary schooling in Salasa, Bugallón went to San Isidro, Nueva Ecija, where he studied under Don Rufino Villaruz. He finished his first and second years of secondary schooling in 1882. In 1886, he enrolled at the Colegio de San Juan de Letran in Manila, where he completed his secondary course and earned a Bachelor of Arts degree in 1889, with high scholastic ratings.

After his graduation, Bugallón entered the Seminary of San Carlos with the intention of becoming a priest. However, he passed the validation examination given by the Spanish government in 1892, and he was sent abroad as a pensionado of the government to the Academia Militar de Toledo. As a result, Bugallon spent three years of his life studying military science and warfare.

== Philippine Revolution ==
In 1896, Bugallón graduated from the Academia and was commissioned in the Spanish Army with the rank of second lieutenant. He was dispatched to the Philippines where he joined the 70th Infantry Regiment. When the Philippine Revolution broke out, he and his regiment were posted in Cavite and Batangas. Bugallón exhibited exemplary heroism at the Battle of Talisay, Batangas, on May 30, 1897; as a result, he was awarded the Cross of María Cristina and the Cruz Roja del Merito Militar (Red Cross for Military Honor).

== Treaty of Paris ==
On December 10, 1898, the Treaty of Paris was signed, ending the Spanish–American War. Bugallón was able to obtain his clearance papers at this time.

During this period, relations between the First Philippine Republic and the United States began to sour, especially with the American occupation of Manila. On January 23, 1899, Antonio Luna was appointed as head of the Philippine Army.

Realizing possible American hostility, he began to reorganize the Filipino revolutionary forces. Luna recruited many officers and soldiers of the former Spanish colonial army, one of which was Bugallón, who apparently already held the rank of major. As aide-de-camp to Luna, Bugallón was responsible for the recruitment of Spanish war veterans, and he was very instrumental in reorganizing the Philippine Army, particularly as a faculty member of the Academia Militar established by Luna in Malolos, Bulacan in October 1898. As a result, Bugallon became an invaluable officer to Luna.

== Philippine–American War and death ==
On February 4, 1899, the Philippine–American War erupted. Bugallon rejoined Luna in the field immediately.

The next day, February 5, saw them in La Loma hill, the present-day site of La Loma Cemetery, between Manila and Caloocan. While holding the line, American troops under General Arthur MacArthur, Jr. charged and outflanked them. As a result, Bugallon and his men were exposed to enemy fire, and he sustained a bullet in his thighs.

Upon learning that Bugallón was wounded, Luna ordered:

Bugallón wounded. Order forward. He must be saved at all costs. Bugallón is worth 500 Filipino soldiers. He is one of my hopes for future victory.

Luna found Bugallón severely wounded and prostrate in a ditch along the road. "Don't expose yourself so much. Don't advance any farther," Bugallón said.

For his bravery, Luna instantly promoted Bugallón to lieutenant colonel. The wounded hero was rushed by train to the medical station in Caloocan, hoping that he could be kept alive until he could be brought to the hospital in Malolos. However, it was too late; after inquiring if the Filipino reinforcements had arrived, he then expired in Luna's arms. Allegedly, Luna unashamedly wept for Bugallón.

== Burial and perpetuation of memory ==
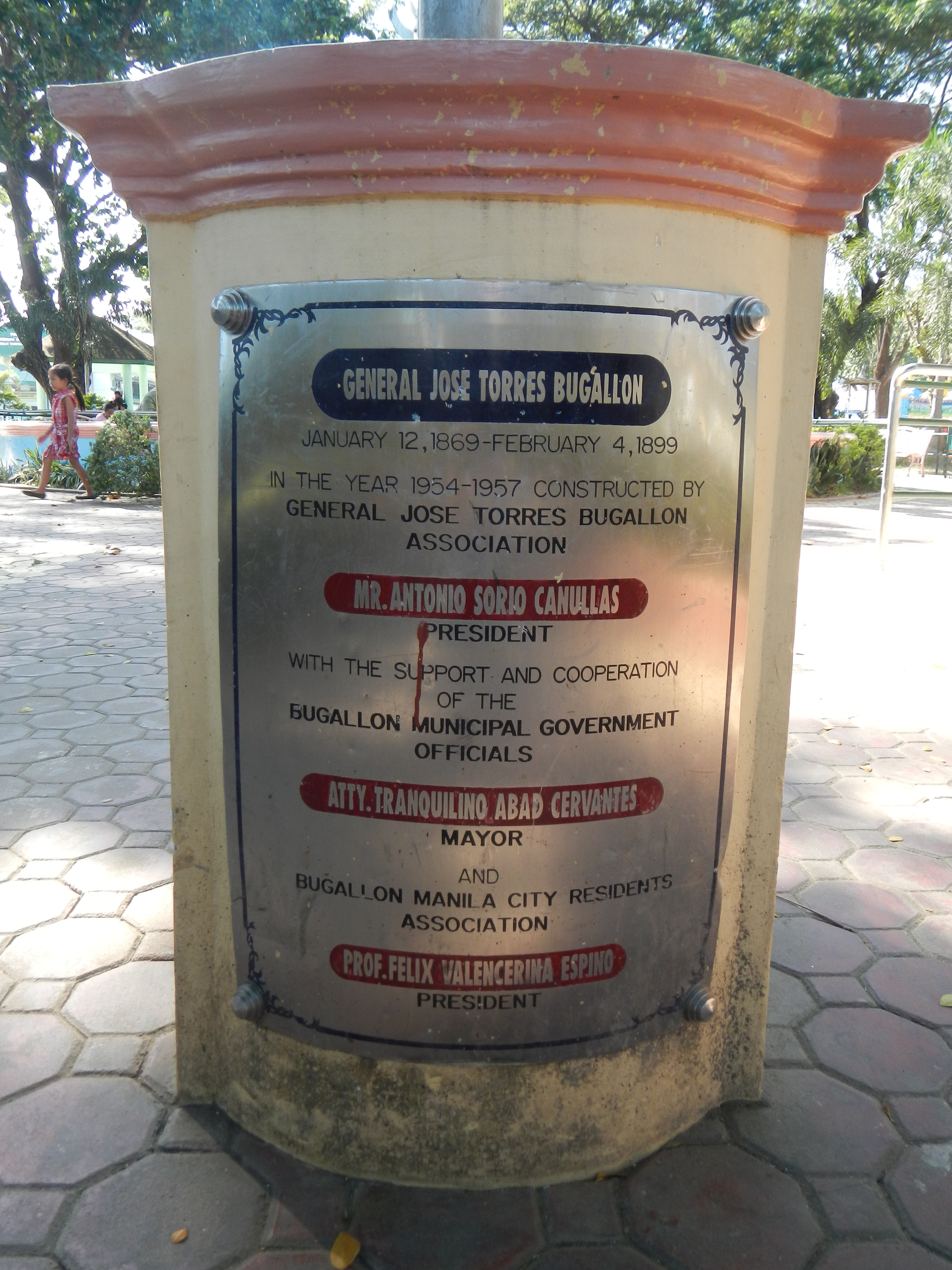
Marker.

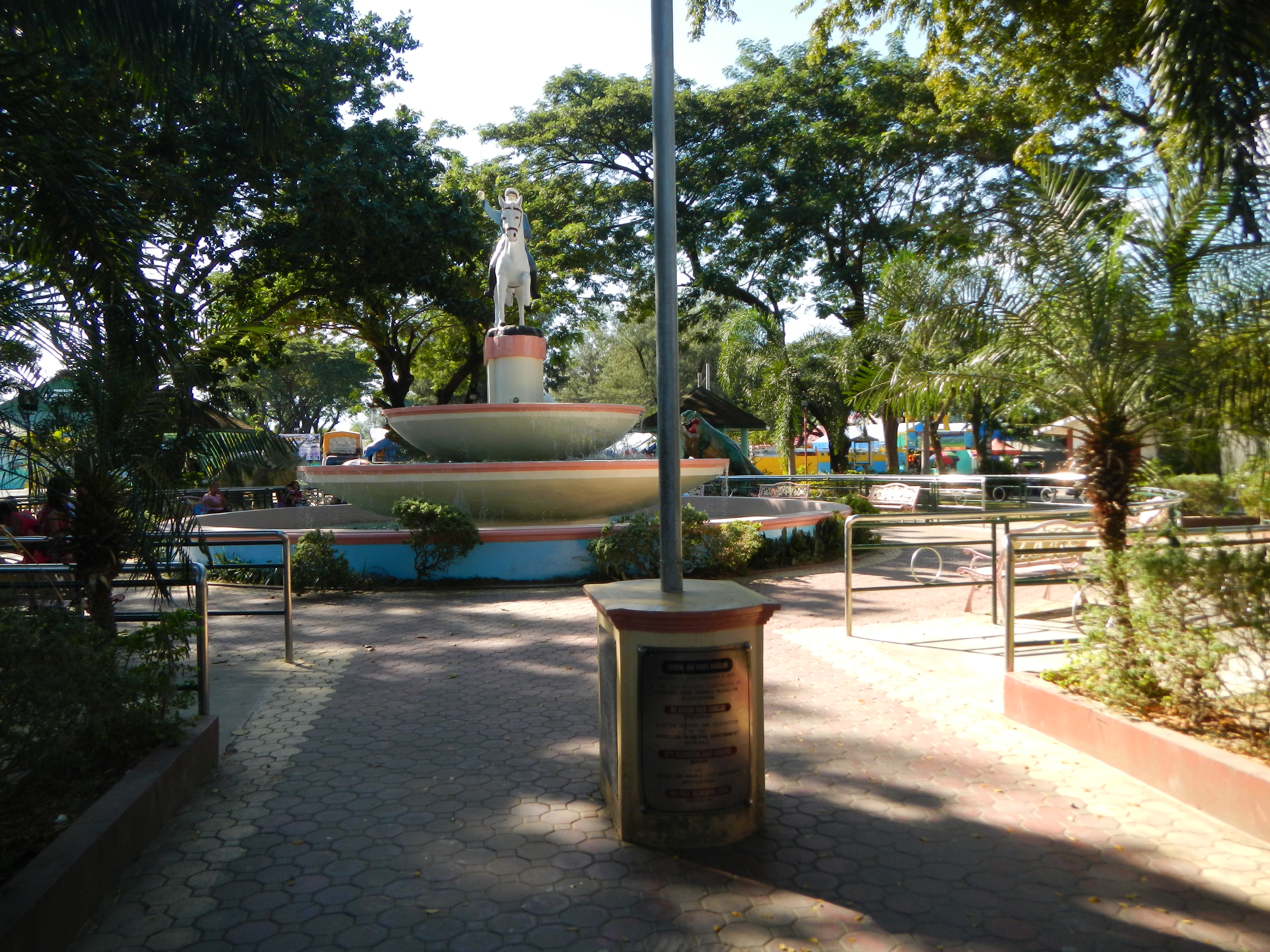
Monument in Bugallon, Pangasinan.

Arrangements were made to bury his remains in Bigaa but it was decided later to inter the corpse at the Malolos cemetery. There a tomb with a modest stone slab marked his final resting place.

In 1921, to perpetuate his memory, Congressman Mauro Navarro of Pangasinan sponsored a law that changed the municipality of Salasa, the hero's birthplace, to Bugallon.

His remains are now buried in the Sampaloc Church in Manila.
