= Aguilar, Pangasinan =

Municipality in Pangasinan, Philippines

Aguilar
- Municipality
- Municipality of Aguilar
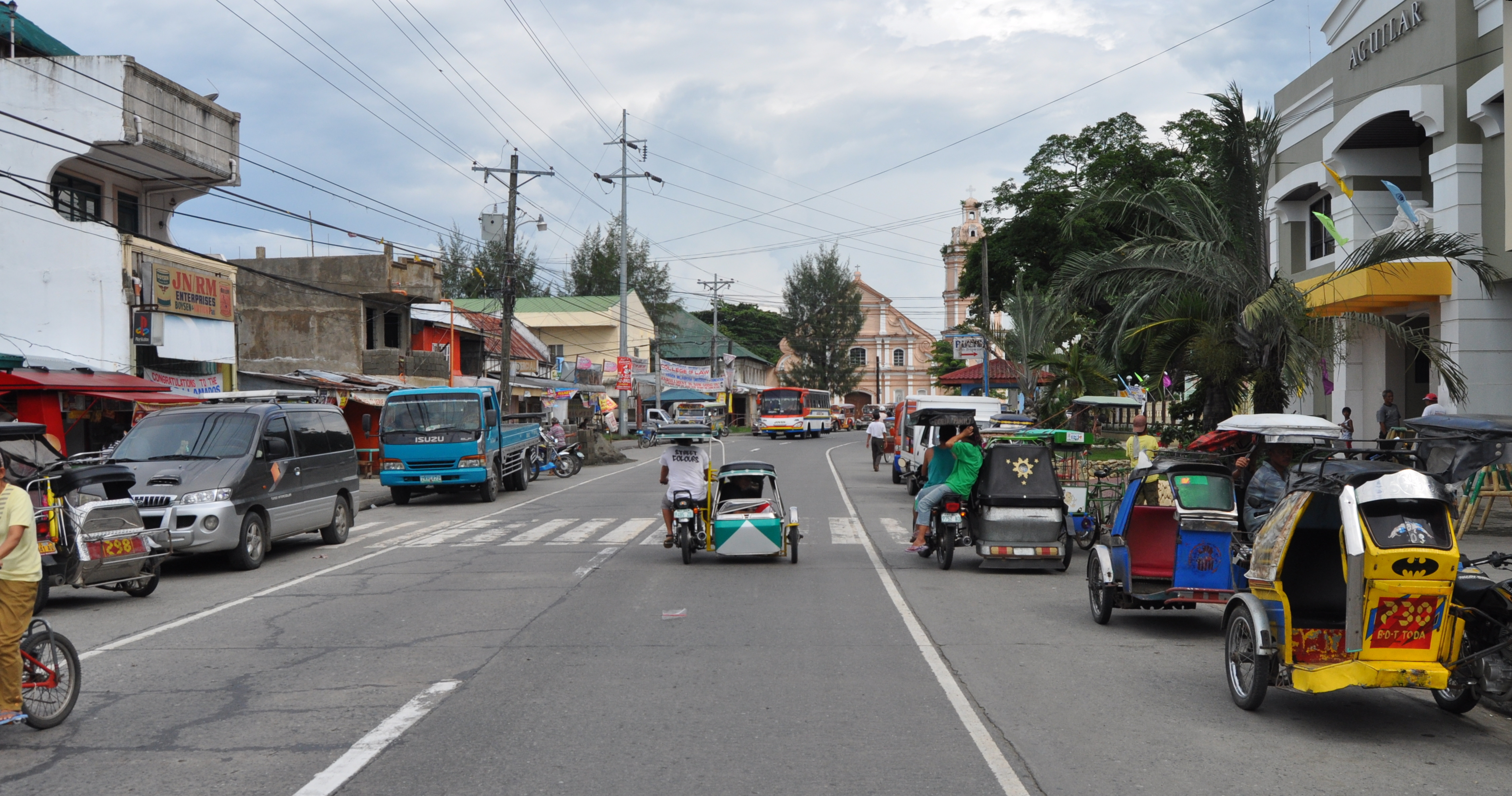
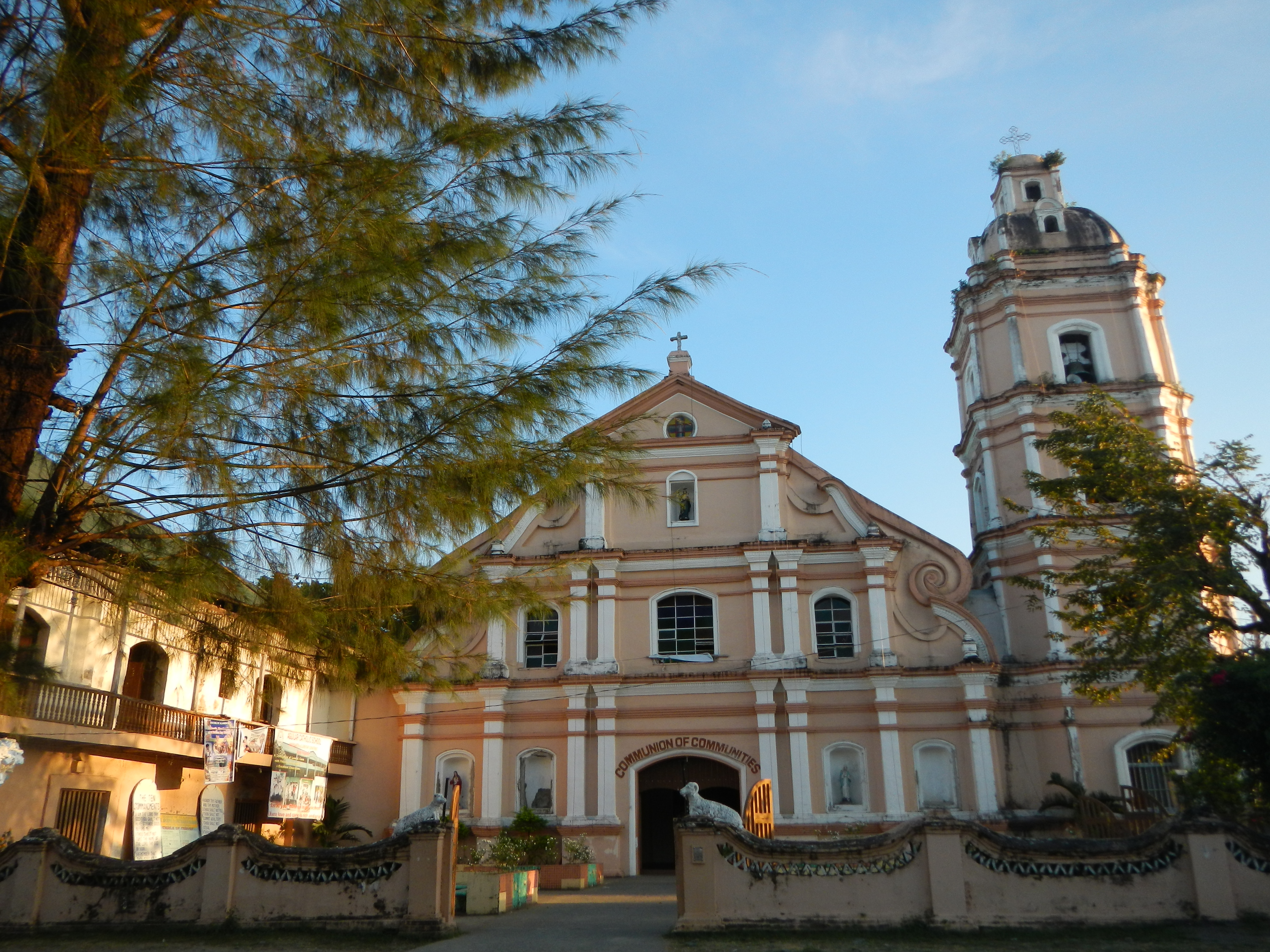
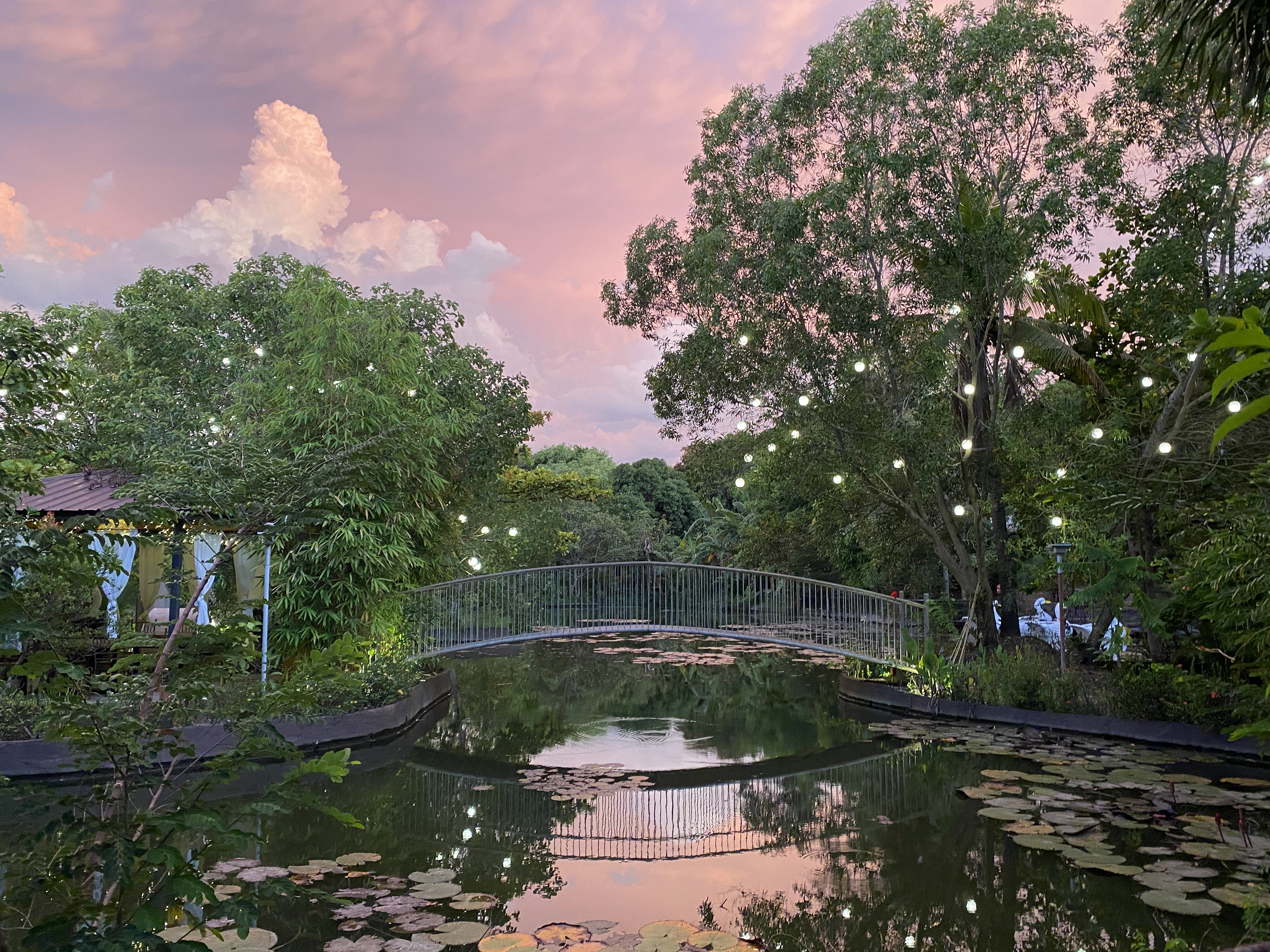
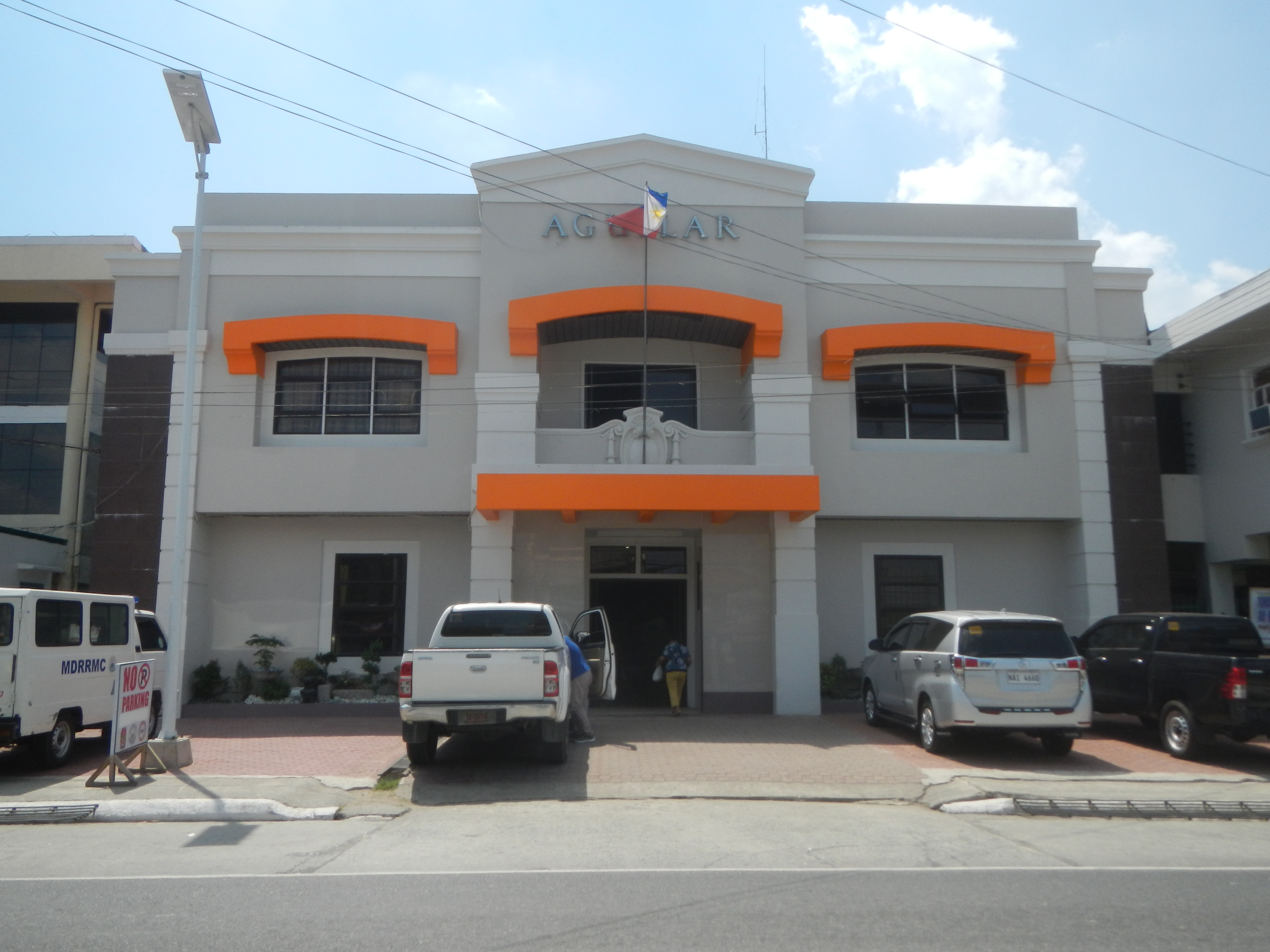
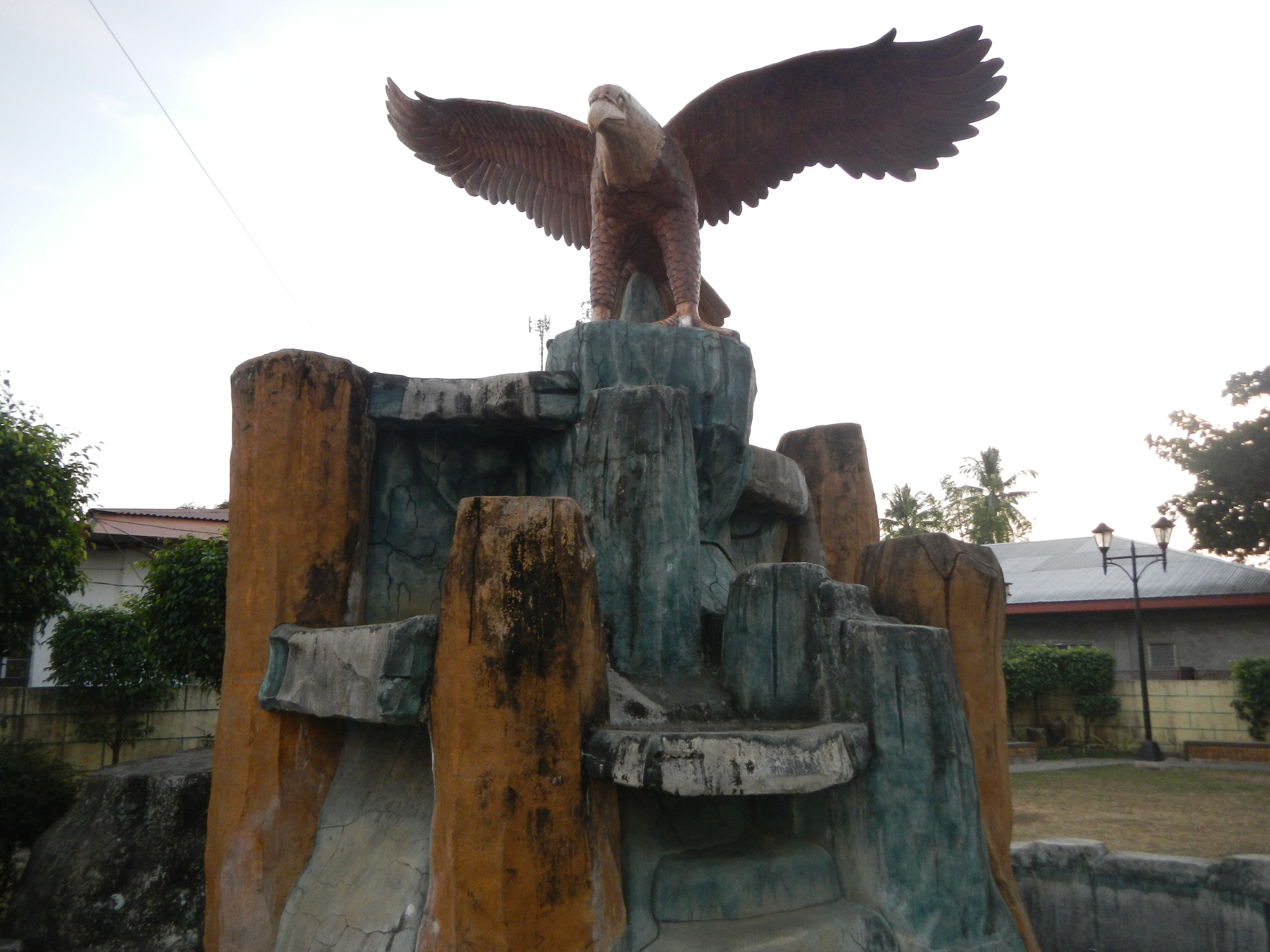
- Clockwise from top: Poblacion area; Kalinaw Bridge; The Eagle; Aguilar Municipal Hall; and Saint Joseph the Patriarch Parish

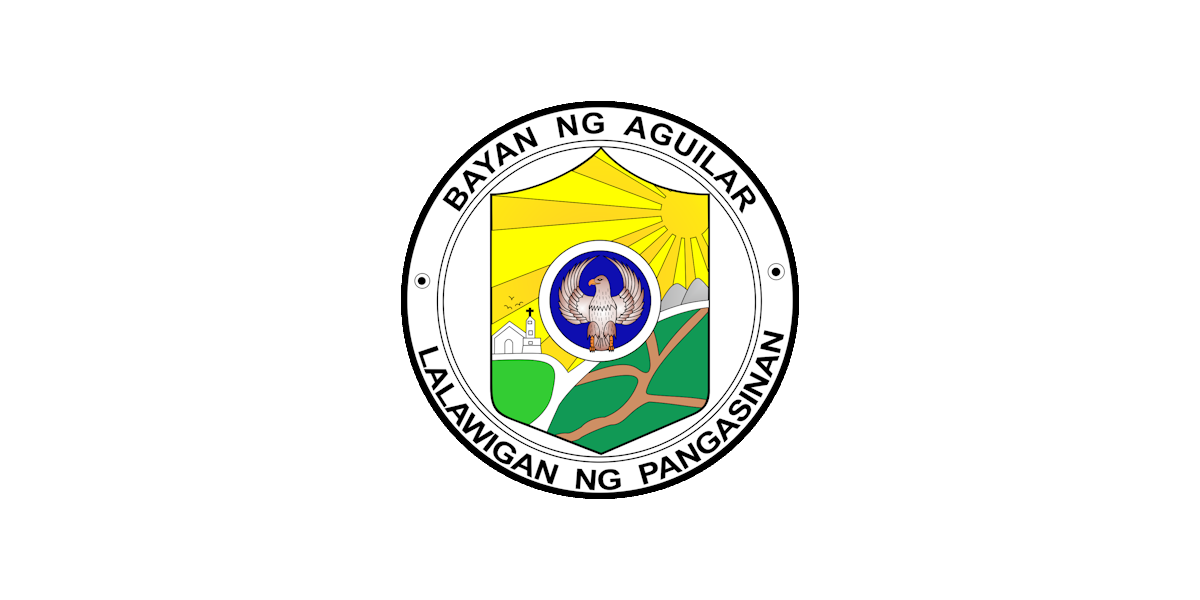
- Flag Seal

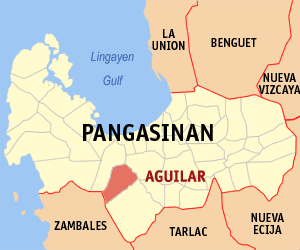
- Map of Pangasinan with Aguilar highlighted
- Interactive map of Aguilar
- Location within the Philippines
- Coordinates: 15°53′24″N 120°14′16″E
- Country: Philippines
- Region: Ilocos Region
- Province: Pangasinan
- District: 2nd district
- Founded: July 16, 1805
- Named for: Rafael María de Aguilar
- Barangays: 16 (see Barangays)

Government
  - Type: Sangguniang Bayan
  - Mayor: Allyson B. Ramos
  - Vice Mayor: Jesus M. Zamuco Jr.
  - Representative: Mark Cojuangco
  - Municipal Council: Members: Evelyn G. Villanueva; Tito Cortez; Jessie S. Posadas; Ramon Sison; Angelo Limos; Renato Cervantes; Mat Dumlao; Almer Villanueva
  - Electorate: 31,030 voters (2025)

Area
  - Total: 195.07 km^{2} (75.32 sq mi)
- Elevation: 41 m (135 ft)
- Highest elevation: 360 m (1,180 ft)
- Lowest elevation: 2 m (6.6 ft)

Population (2024 census)
  - Total: 45,363
  - Density: 232.55/km^{2} (602.29/sq mi)
  - Households: 9,934

Economy
  - Income class: 1st municipal income class
  - Poverty incidence: 15.04% (2023)
  - Revenue: ₱ 229.2 million (2024)
  - Assets: ₱ 1,466 million (2024)
  - Expenditure: ₱ 255.8 million (2024)
  - Liabilities: ₱ 105.6 million (2024)

Service provider
  - Electricity: Central Pangasinan Electric Cooperative (CENPELCO)
- Time zone: UTC+8 (PST)
- ZIP code: 2415
- PSGC: 0105502000
- IDD : area code: +63 (0)75
- Native languages: Pangasinan; Ilocano; Tagalog
- Website: www.aguilar-pangasinan.gov.ph

Aguilar, officially the Municipality of Aguilar (Pangasinan: Baley na Aguilar; Ilocano: Ili ti Aguilar; Tagalog: Bayan ng Aguilar), is a municipality in the province of Pangasinan, Philippines. According to the 2024 census, it has a population of 45,363 people.

== Etymology ==
The municipality was named after Spanish governor-general Rafael María de Aguilar, who ordered the establishment of an independent civil political unit in the area on 16 July 1805.

== History ==
The Municipality of Aguilar had its early beginnings as a cattle ranch founded by the Spaniards. The place was known then as Sitio Balubad, which was then still part of the town of Binalatongan (now San Carlos). On the western part were the Zambales Mountains with its thick forests and verdant foliage. It was a hunter's paradise with deer and wild boar occasionally being spotted in the area. The grass in the plains were succulent fare for fattening cattle and the water from the brooks and streams clear and sparkling.

On the eastern part was the Agno River. At that time, there roads were yet to be built. There were footpaths which were eventually expanded into roads to improve mobility and access, but the river arteries constituted the main mode of transportation in the interior towns. Through these river systems, boats sailed from the Ilocos provinces in the north southwards to Dagupan, Calasiao, Lingayen and sometimes even as far as San Isidro de Labrador, Salasa, Aguilar and Camiling. Worth noting was the fossiliferous riverbank in Camiling which was useful in making lime, while mineral waters consisting of ferruginous and alkaline waters were and are still found in Aguilar and Mangatarem.

As a thriving place for cattle and bountiful rice harvests, it was natural for Aguilar to attract people from other towns to stay and settle in the place. The early settlers prospered and lived in peace and contentment. When the Spaniards in Lingayen heard of this flourishing village, they sent Spanish explorers through the town of Salasa to visit the place. Some Spanish soldiers and priest were left to organize a pueblo. In time, the clamor to convert the settlement into a town became popular. A petition was therefore, filed with the principales or municipal officials of Binalatongan to convert the village into a town. The petition was finally favorably endorsed.

The decree establishing Aguilar as an independent civil political unit was issued on 16 July 1805 by Governor General Rafael Maria de Aguilar, after whom the town was named. The decree in Lingayen on 1 August 1805. However, it was not until 19 January 1806 that the Provincial Governor of Pangasinan was able to make the trip to the sitio of Balubad, the site of the Poblacion, to carry out the provisions of the decree. The Governor inspected the area, chose the most appropriate site on which to erect the town center and listed the people who wishes to settle in the new town, together with their places of origin. The greatest number came from Lingayen, made up of 210 couples and 60 individuals from the "gremio de naturals" (native community) and 10 couples and 11 individuals from the "gremio de mestizos" (mestizo community). From the town of Salasa, there were 56 couples and 21 bachelors all of the rank of "Caylianes" (commoners), while from the town of San Carlos, there were 32 couples and 19 individuals, all "Caylianes". There were also Ilocano migrants consisting of 6 couples and 24 bachelors. Finally, there were some Negritos, consisting of both baptized Christians and Ynfieles (Non-Christians). All in all, the total number of inhabitants composed 401 tributes, for bachelors and unmarried women paid only half a tribute each. These excluded the unbaptized negritos.

The town was formally inaugurated on 9 May 1806 when the first officials were elected and given their appointments by the Alcalde Mayor. The officials were headed by Don Francisco Zamuco as Gobernadorcillo and Don Juan Manguino as "Teniente Primero" (first lieutenant). The Alcalde Mayor then proceeded to mark the jurisdictional limits of the new town. With the town of Salasa, the boundary was the river Balubad (now Sobol) from the mountain where the river originated to the river Agno, running a direct line from west to east. With the town of San Carlos, the boundary was the Agno River in the east and the Bunlalacao River in the south. The necessary boundary markers were placed and operations were witnessed by the town officials of Salasa and San Carlos. Mangatarem as a town did not yet exist, having been founded only in 1837. Local folklores likewise maintained that Aguilar was identified with an eagle or agila that used to fly around the place at nighttime and would perch on a fence or alar when tired of flying, hence, agila and alar put together formed Aguilar.

=== Leadership by the Principales ===
Although the population of Aguilar was drawn from different places, the leadership of the town was furnished by the elite families, the principales who had moved from Lingayen to Aguilar in 1805. Aguilar also had a large number of Ilocano migrants among the population. Their tributes in fact contributed to the political viability of the new town. But in all these new towns, the initiative for and leadership in building the new town came from the Pangasinan native-born elite.

=== Polos or Forced Labor in Local Infrastructures ===
The Gobernadorcillo usually took charge of public works and improvements in the town. This included the building and repair of public structures, including churches and convents, as well as construction and repair of roads and bridges under the parish curate's supervision. For this purpose, the services of Caylianes were utilized. They were required to render 40 days of labor or Polos a year. The Gobernadorcillo also had to procure building materials from the town if possible; if not he had to send a request for approval to the Superior Government in Manila through Alcalde Mayor. He must also keep clean and sanitary the casa tribunal and the public jail.

== Geography ==
Aguilar is situated 16.16 kilometres (10.04 mi) from the provincial capital Lingayen, and 200.96 kilometres (124.87 mi) from the country's capital city of Manila.

=== Barangays ===
Aguilar is politically subdivided into 16 barangays. Each barangay consists of puroks and some have sitios.

- Bayaoas
- Baybay
- Bocacliw
- Bocboc East
- Bocboc West
- Buer
- Calsib
- Laoag
- Manlocboc
- Niñoy
- Panacol
- Poblacion
- Pogomboa
- Pogonsili
- San Jose
- Tampac

=== Climate ===
Climate data for Aguilar, Pangasinan
| Month | Jan | Feb | Mar | Apr | May | Jun | Jul | Aug | Sep | Oct | Nov | Dec | Year |
|---|---|---|---|---|---|---|---|---|---|---|---|---|---|
| Mean daily maximum °C (°F) | 31 (88) | 31 (88) | 31 (88) | 33 (91) | 32 (90) | 32 (90) | 30 (86) | 30 (86) | 30 (86) | 31 (88) | 31 (88) | 31 (88) | 31 (88) |
| Mean daily minimum °C (°F) | 21 (70) | 21 (70) | 22 (72) | 24 (75) | 24 (75) | 24 (75) | 25 (77) | 23 (73) | 23 (73) | 23 (73) | 23 (73) | 22 (72) | 23 (73) |
| Average precipitation mm (inches) | 5.1 (0.20) | 11.6 (0.46) | 21.1 (0.83) | 27.7 (1.09) | 232.9 (9.17) | 350.8 (13.81) | 679.8 (26.76) | 733.1 (28.86) | 505 (19.9) | 176.6 (6.95) | 67.2 (2.65) | 17.7 (0.70) | 2,828.6 (111.38) |
| Average rainy days | 3 | 3 | 3 | 4 | 14 | 18 | 23 | 25 | 22 | 15 | 8 | 4 | 142 |
Source: World Weather Online (modeled/calculated data, not measured locally)

== Demographics ==
Population Census of Aguilar

| Year | Pop. | ±% p.a. |
|---|---|---|
| 1903 | 4,763 | — |
| 1918 | 6,006 | +1.56% |
| 1939 | 8,178 | +1.48% |
| 1948 | 10,587 | +2.91% |
| 1960 | 14,125 | +2.43% |
| 1970 | 17,696 | +2.28% |

| Year | Pop. | ±% p.a. |
|---|---|---|
| 1975 | 19,853 | +2.33% |
| 1980 | 22,080 | +2.15% |
| 1990 | 27,303 | +2.15% |
| 1995 | 30,578 | +2.15% |
| 2000 | 33,213 | +1.79% |
| 2007 | 36,564 | +1.33% |

| Year | Pop. | ±% p.a. |
|---|---|---|
| 2010 | 39,529 | +2.88% |
| 2015 | 41,463 | +0.91% |
| 2020 | 45,100 | +1.79% |
| 2024 | 45,363 | +0.14% |

Source: Philippine Statistics Authority

== Economy ==
Poverty incidence of Aguilar (%)

Source: Philippine Statistics Authority

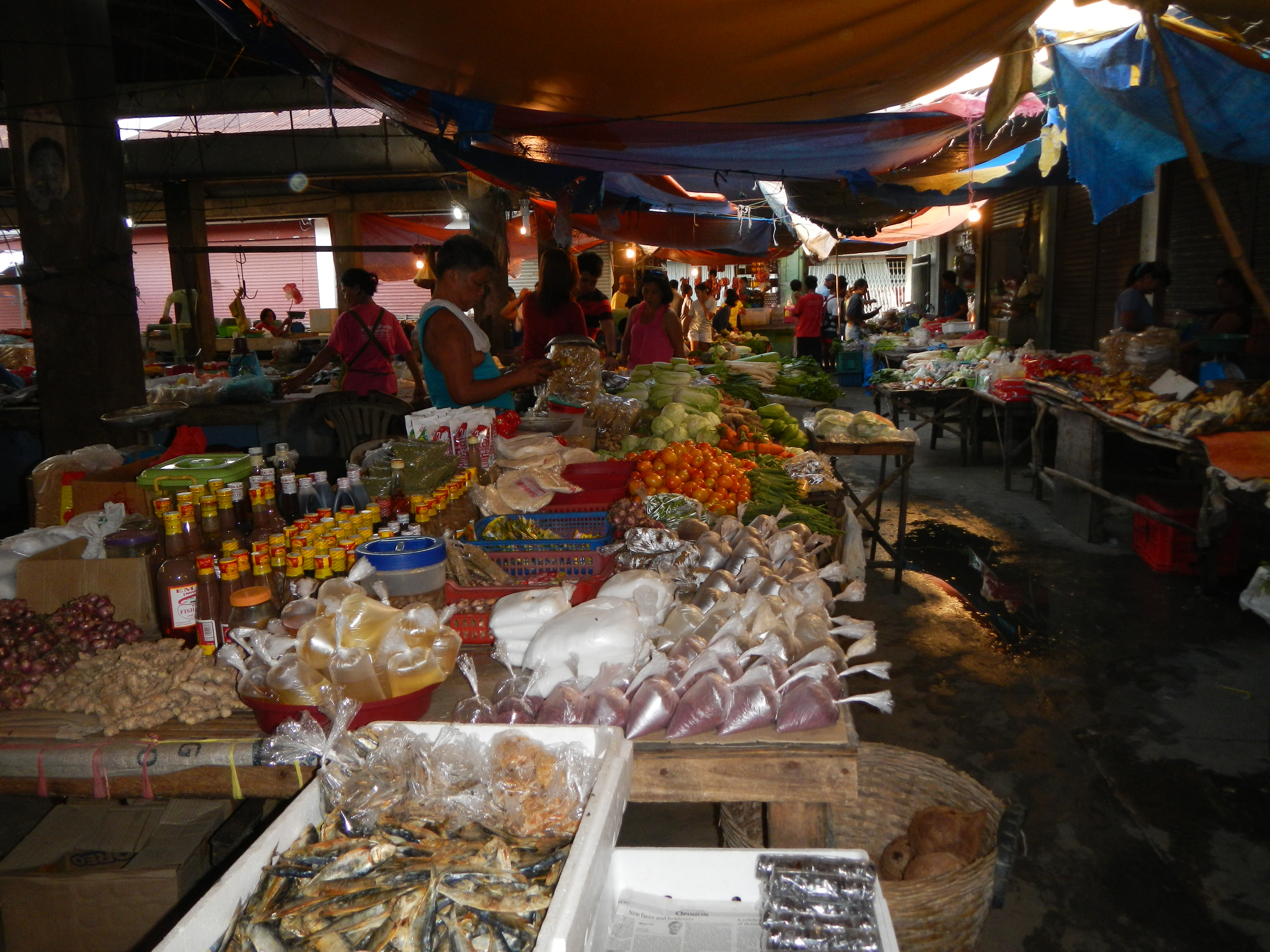
Aguilar Public Market interior

Because of the majority of vast farmlands in Aguilar, The major crops planted in the municipality are Rice, Corn, Vegetables, Mangoes, Luffas and other crops. Aguilar is also engages in Poultry and Livestock Raising including Cows, Pigs, Carabaos, Goats, Chickens and Domestic Ducks. Tourism is also a booming industry in the municipality due to the sudden growth of tourists visiting; due to this, various resorts has been established in various locations.

== Government ==
=== Local government ===
Aguilar, belonging to the second congressional district of the province of Pangasinan, is governed by a mayor designated as its local chief executive and by a municipal council as its legislative body in accordance with the Local Government Code. The mayor, vice mayor, and the councilors are elected directly by the people through an election which is being held every three years.

=== Elected officials ===
Members of the Municipal Council (2019–2022):

- Congressman: Jumel Anthony I. Espino
- Mayor:
- Vice-Mayor: Jesus M. Zamuco Jr.
- Councilors:
  - Evelyn G. Villanueva
  - Kristal B. Soriano
  - Jessie S. Posadas
  - Renato L. Cervantes
  - Defin R. Dumlao
  - Magdalena O. Sison
  - Angelo Y. Limos
  - Crispin B. Repato Jr.

== Tourism ==
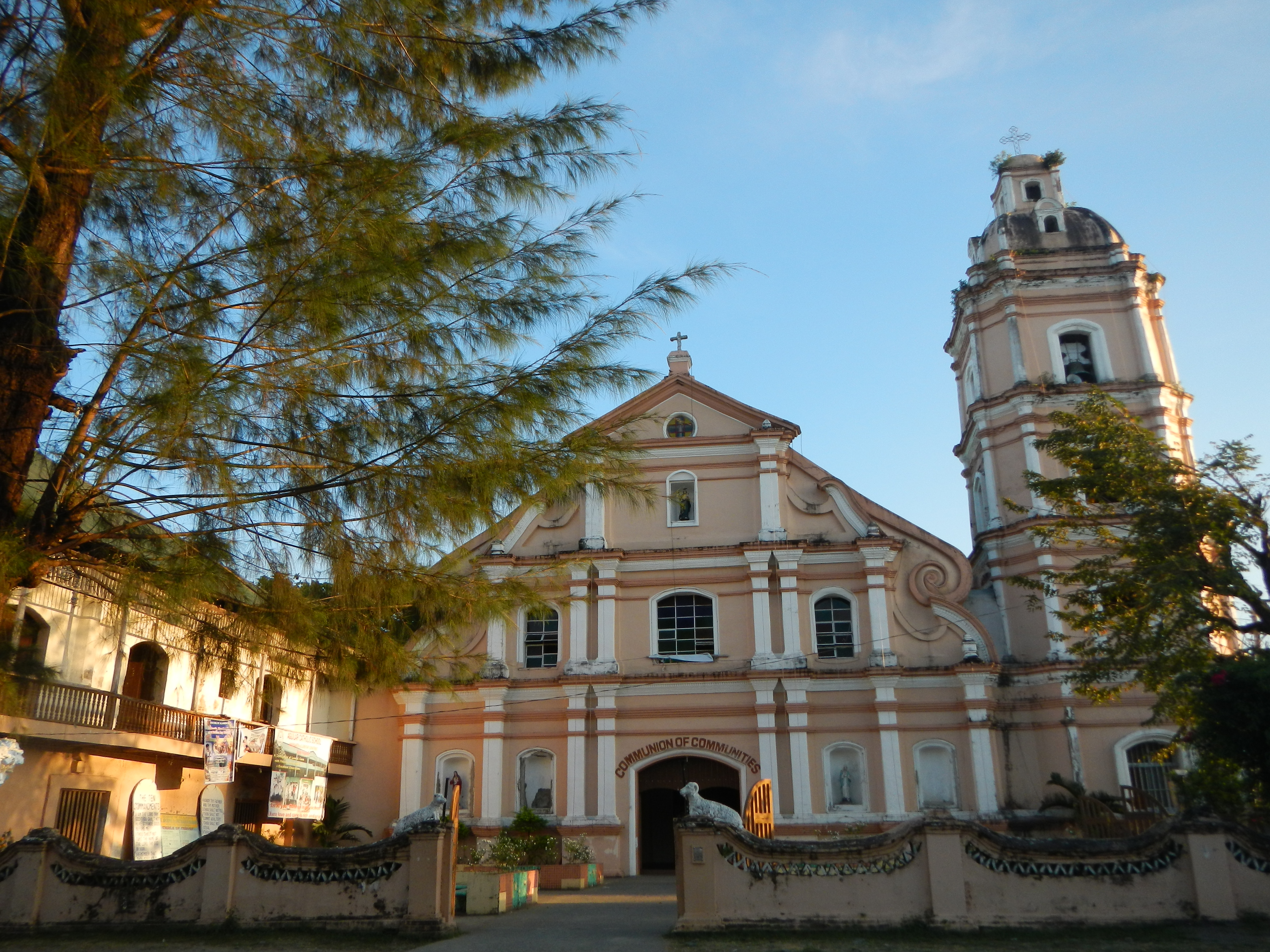
Facade of Saint Joseph the Patriarch Parish Church

There are many tourist spots in Aguilar, some of which are:

- St. Joseph The Patriarch Church – built during 1810 by the help of friars to build the first church in Aguilar. It was named after the Patron Saint of the town and celebrated every March 18 the town's fiesta.
- Mt. Nambersian – Hikers can climb to the summit of Mount Nambersian in Barangay Niñoy, Aguilar.
- Mapita Falls - one of the best gems of the town of Aguilar

== Education ==
The Aguilar Schools District Office governs all educational institutions within the municipality. It oversees the management and operations of all private and public elementary and high schools.

=== Primary and elementary schools ===
- Aguilar Catholic School
- Aguilar Central School
- Aguilar Holy Infant Educational Center
- Aguilar Learning Center
- Anonang Elementary School
- Baybay Elementary School
- Bocacliw Elementary School
- Bocboc East Elementary School
- Bocboc West Elementary School
- Buer-Bayaoas Elementary School
- Caslib Elementary School
- Casagatan Elementary School
- Dona Catalina Elementary School
- Manlocboc Elementary School
- Ninoy Elementary School
- Pogonsili Elementary School
- Panacol Elementary School
- Sipitan Elementary School
- Tampac Elementary School
- The Maranatha Baptist Academy
- Zaratan Educational Institute

=== Secondary schools ===
- Aguilar integrated School
- Bocboc East National High School
- Don G. Dumlao National High School
- Enrico T. Prado National High School
- Tampac Integrated School
- Mapita Integrated School
