= Bugallon =

Municipality in Pangasinan, Philippines

Bugallon Salasa
- Municipality
- Municipality of Bugallon
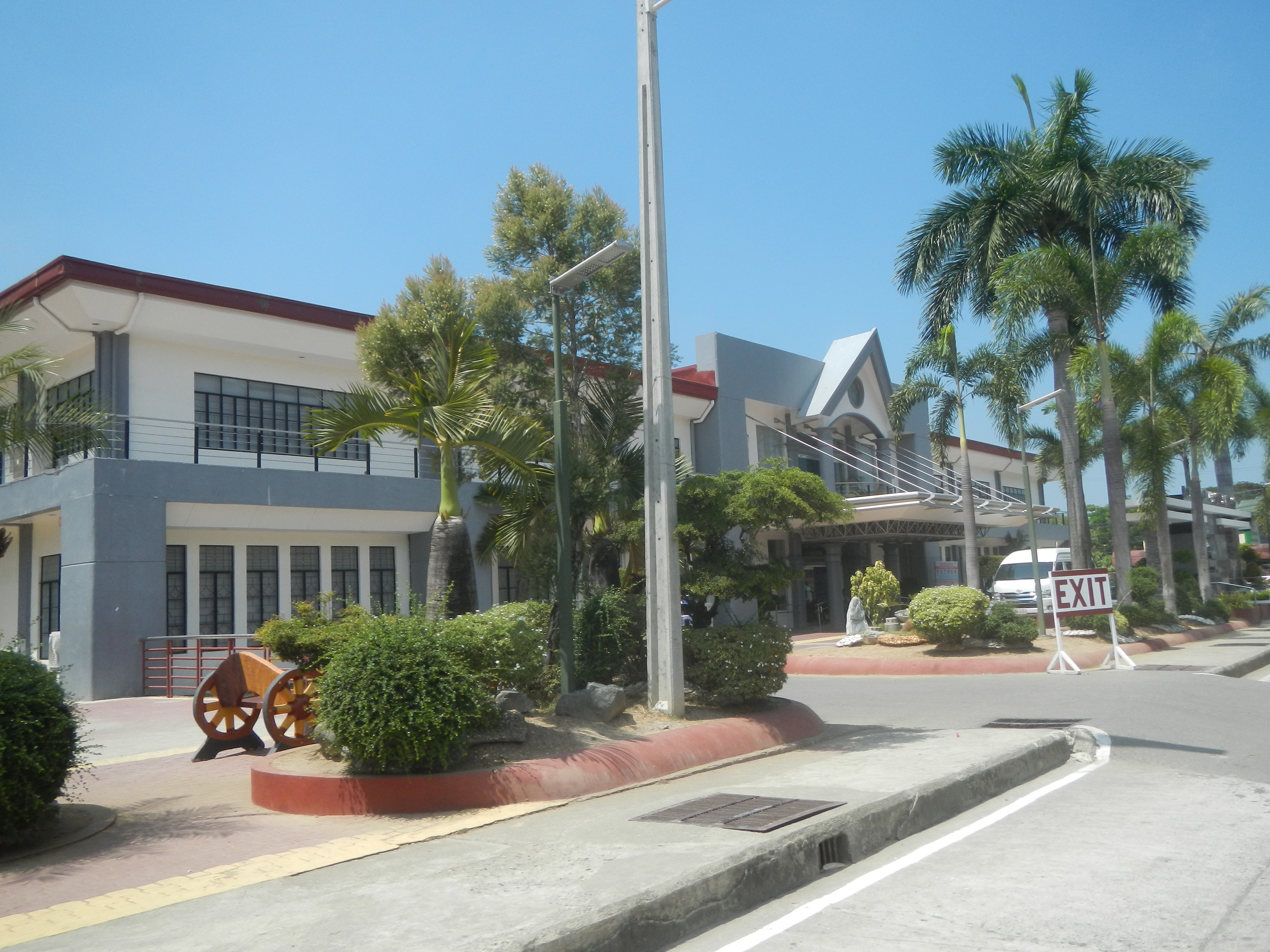
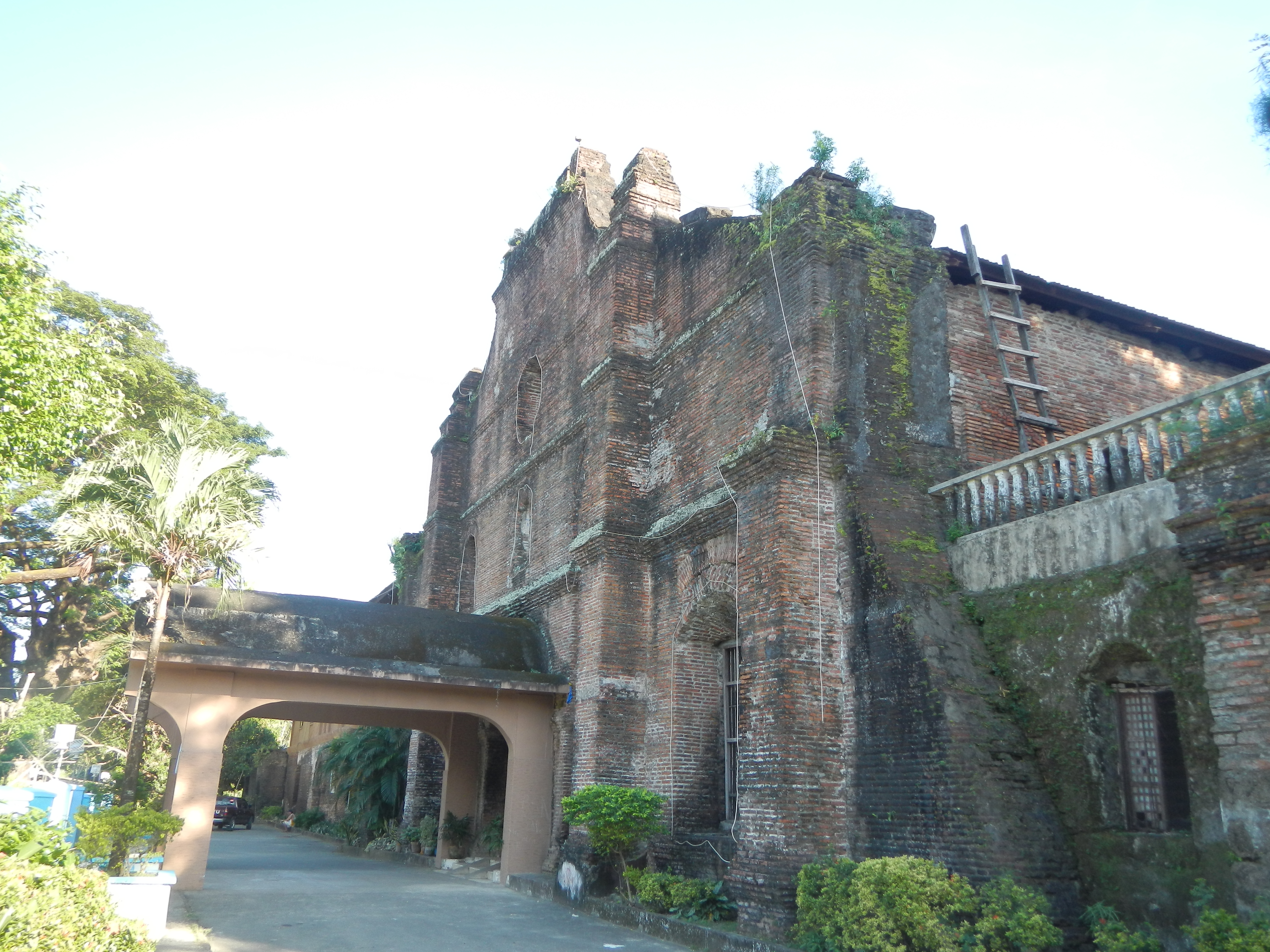
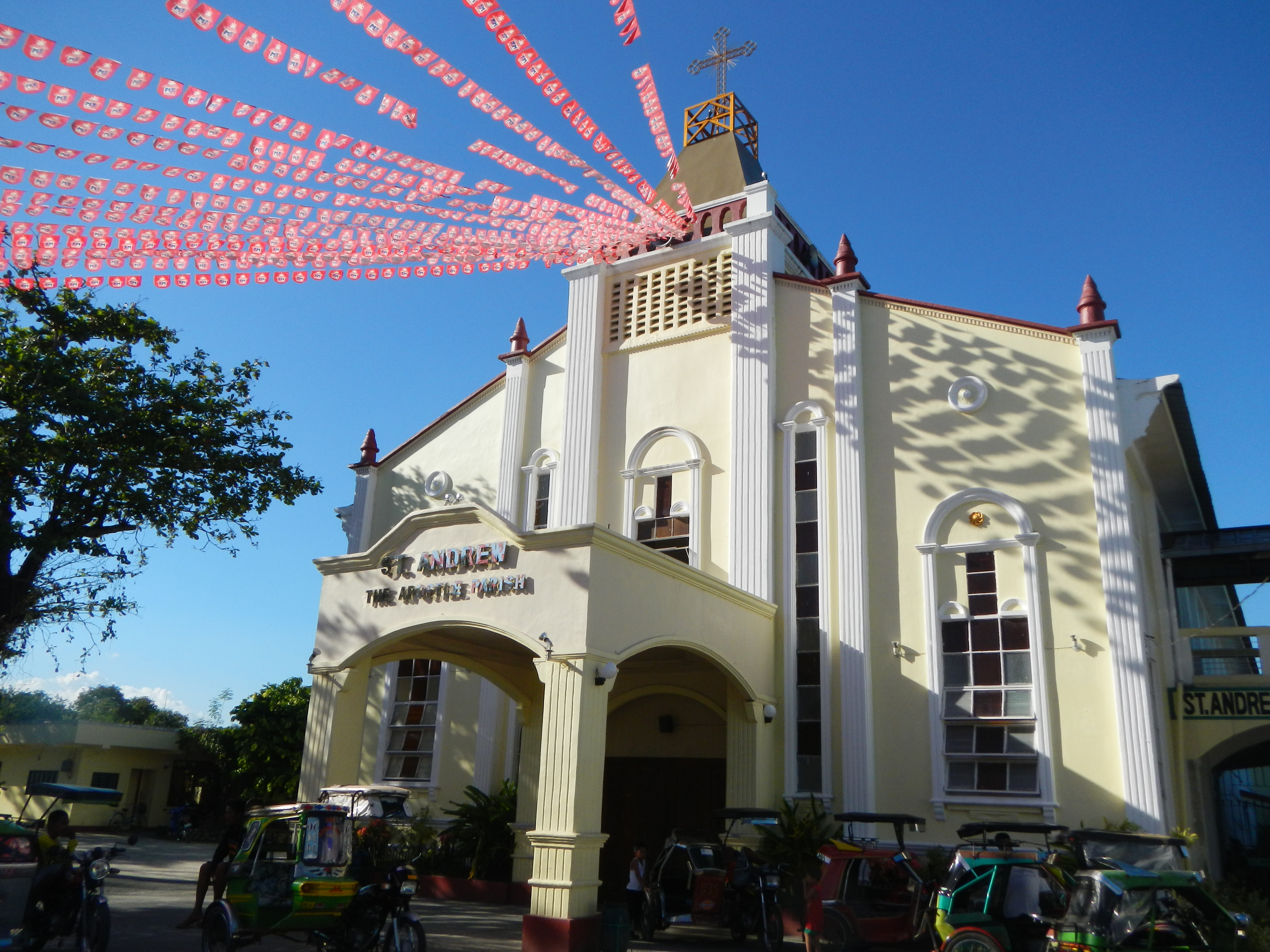
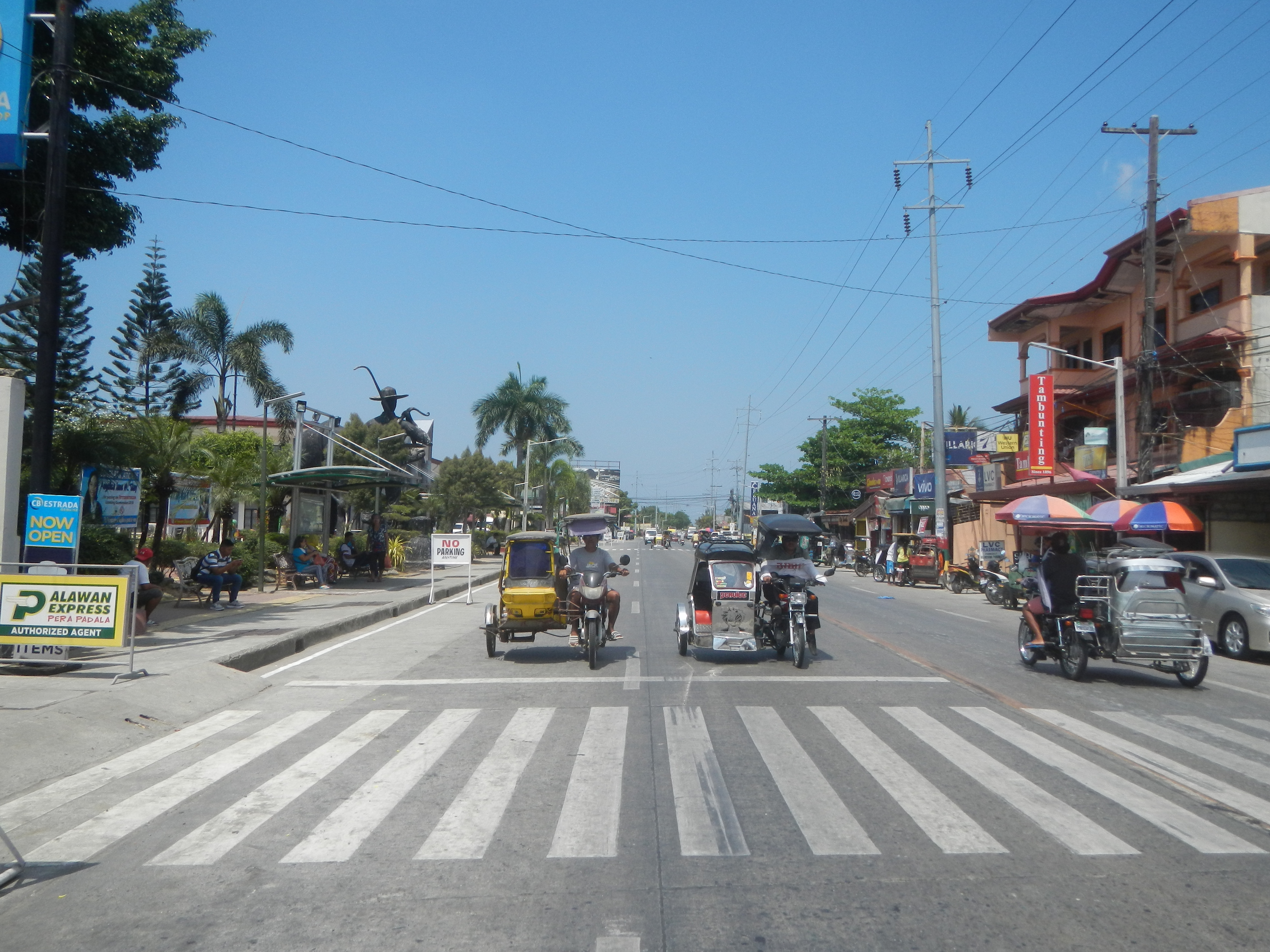
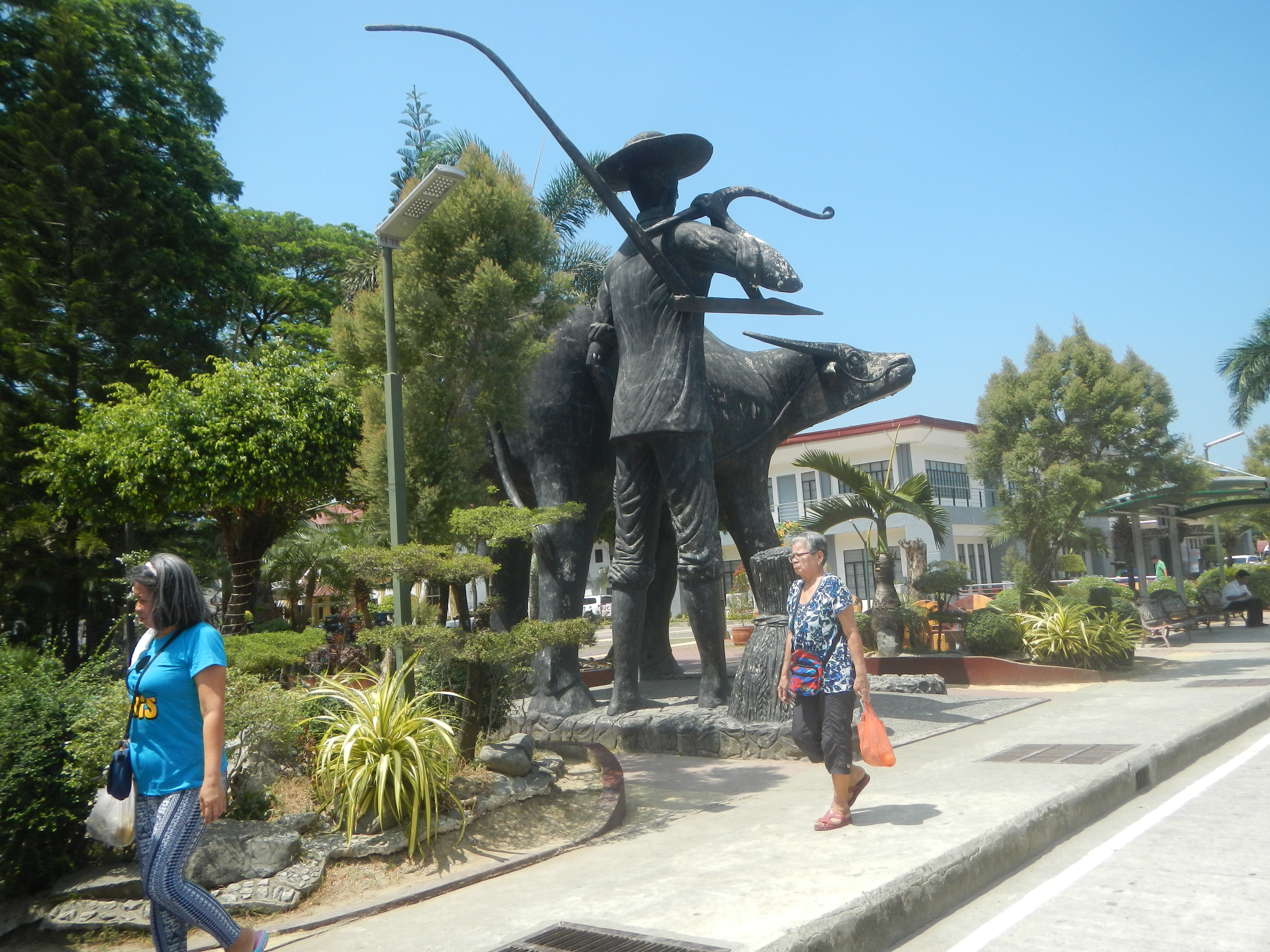
- Clockwise from top: Bugallon Municipal Hall; Saint Andrew the Apostle Parish Church; Romulo Highway; backside of Bugallon farmer-carabao landmark; and Our Lady of Lourdes Parish Church (Bugallon)

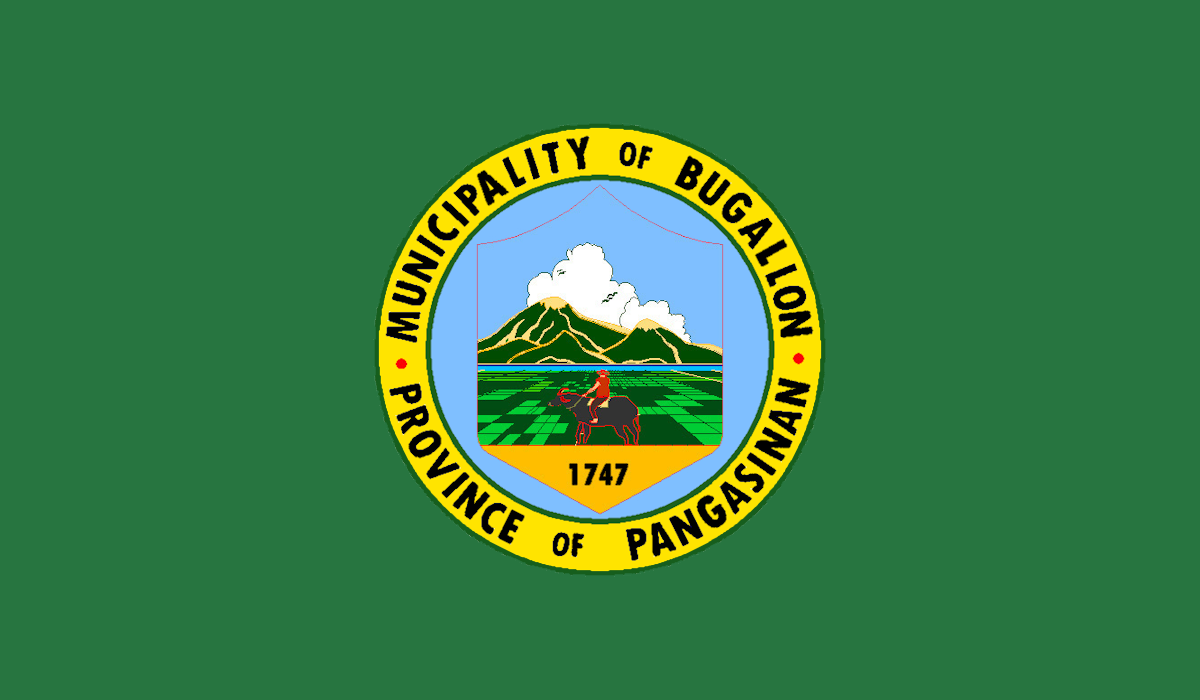
- Flag Seal

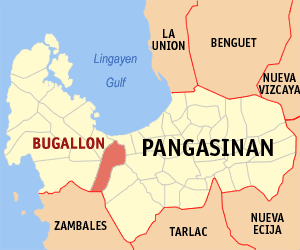
- Map of Pangasinan with Bugallon highlighted
- Interactive map of Bugallon
- Location within the Philippines
- Coordinates: 15°55′N 120°11′E
- Country: Philippines
- Region: Ilocos Region
- Province: Pangasinan
- District: 2nd district
- Founded (as Salasa): 1747
- Renamed (as Bugallon): January 12, 1921
- Named for: José Torres Bugallón
- Barangays: 24 (see Barangays)

Government
  - Type: Sangguniang Bayan
  - Mayor: William Dy
  - Vice Mayor: Rogelio “Benjie” Madriguera
  - Representative: Mark Cojuangco
  - Municipal Council: Members: Rogelio M. Madriguera; Aislinn L. de Guzman; Marlon Y. Cuison; Ernesto A. Tanigue; Ramie T. Ocsan; Gemma C. Hipol; Bernardo F. de Vera; Rolando A. Manaoat
  - Electorate: 52,836 voters (2025)

Area
  - Total: 189.64 km^{2} (73.22 sq mi)
- Elevation: 15 m (49 ft)
- Highest elevation: 195 m (640 ft)
- Lowest elevation: 1 m (3.3 ft)

Population (2024 census)
  - Total: 76,027
  - Density: 400.90/km^{2} (1,038.3/sq mi)
  - Households: 17,456

Economy
  - Income class: 1st municipal income class
  - Poverty incidence: 14.46% (2023)
  - Revenue: ₱ 322.4 million (2024)
  - Assets: ₱ 587.2 million (2024)
  - Expenditure: ₱ 273.2 million (2024)
  - Liabilities: ₱ 188.5 million (2024)

Service provider
  - Electricity: Central Pangasinan Electric Cooperative (CENPELCO)
- Time zone: UTC+8 (PST)
- ZIP code: 2416
- PSGC: 0105515000
- IDD : area code: +63 (0)75
- Native languages: Pangasinan; Ilocano; Tagalog; Kankanaey

Bugallon, officially the Municipality of Bugallon (Pangasinan: Baley na Bugallon; Ilocano: Ili ti Bugallon; Tagalog: Bayan ng Bugallon), is a municipality in the province of Pangasinan, Philippines. According to the 2024 census, it has a population of 76,027 people.

== History ==
The Municipality of Bugallon was formerly called "Salasa" (meaning floor joist in Pangasinense, a part of a wooden house where the floor is attached to). In the Spanish colonial era, the Spanish authorities established the town center in Poblacion (now Barangay Salasa).

Father Antonio Perez founded Salasa in 1720, with the poblacion then located in the property of Don Francisco Valencerina in what is now Barangay Polong. The town center was later transferred to Baranggay Salasa on January 24, 1734, by Father Fernando Garcia. The plaza, presidencia, the church, and the convent were engineered in a grid pattern by the clergy at the time.

Massive flooding in 1914 drove the transfer of the town center to Barrio Anagao (now Barangay Poblacion); but the Our Lady of Lourdes Catholic Church - one of the oldest churches in the country - remained in the old town center as the transfer could not be effected. Thus, a new Catholic church, dedicated to Saint Andrew, was constructed in the new Poblacion. Later on in 1935, Doña Milagros Klar, wife of then manager of Pantranco (Philtranco) donated a statue of the Our Lady of Lourdes to the Salasa Shrine.

In 1921, the town of Salasa was renamed to Bugallon in honor of Major Jose Torres Bugallon, who fought together with General Antonio Luna during the Philippine–American War in 1899. Notably at the Battle of La Loma that took place in February 5, 1899, Bugallon faced Gen. Arthur MacArthur. Bugallon was shot during the battle. Later that day, in the arms of Antonio Luna, Bugallon died from excessive loss of blood.

Mr. Canullas founded the Jose Torres Bugallon Association and a monument was erected in the plaza to commemorate his place in history. The remains of Major Bugallon were interred in the monument on January 12, 1958.

The act of changing Salasa an old town to a new one, Bugallon, required a congressional approval sponsored by the Congressman Mauro Navarro, first district of Pangasinan, and obtained congressional approval in changing Salasa to Bugallon. Hence, Salasa became a mere barangay but remains the seat of Our Lady of Lourdes Parish (11 barangays) and the other is Bugallon's St. Andrew the Apostle (14 barangays).

== Geography ==
Bugallon is situated 8.77 kilometres (5.45 mi) from the provincial capital Lingayen, and 208.89 kilometres (129.80 mi) from the country's capital city of Manila. It is on the northern end of the Olongapo–Bugallon Road, east of Labrador, Pangasinan.

=== Barangays ===
Bugallon is politically subdivided into 24 barangays. Each barangay consists of puroks and some have sitios.

- Angarian
- Asinan
- Bañaga
- Bacabac
- Bolaoen
- Buenlag
- Cabayaoasan
- Cayanga
- Gueset
- Hacienda
- Laguit Centro
- Laguit Padilla
- Magtaking
- Pangascasan
- Pantal
- Poblacion
- Polong
- Portic
- Salasa
- Salomague Norte
- Salomague Sur
- Samat
- San Francisco
- Umanday

=== Climate ===
Climate data for Bugallon, Pangasinan
| Month | Jan | Feb | Mar | Apr | May | Jun | Jul | Aug | Sep | Oct | Nov | Dec | Year |
|---|---|---|---|---|---|---|---|---|---|---|---|---|---|
| Mean daily maximum °C (°F) | 31 (88) | 31 (88) | 31 (88) | 32 (90) | 32 (90) | 32 (90) | 30 (86) | 30 (86) | 30 (86) | 31 (88) | 31 (88) | 31 (88) | 31 (88) |
| Mean daily minimum °C (°F) | 21 (70) | 21 (70) | 22 (72) | 24 (75) | 24 (75) | 24 (75) | 23 (73) | 23 (73) | 23 (73) | 23 (73) | 23 (73) | 22 (72) | 23 (73) |
| Average precipitation mm (inches) | 5.1 (0.20) | 11.6 (0.46) | 21.1 (0.83) | 27.7 (1.09) | 232.9 (9.17) | 350.8 (13.81) | 679.8 (26.76) | 733.1 (28.86) | 505 (19.9) | 176.6 (6.95) | 67.2 (2.65) | 17.7 (0.70) | 2,828.6 (111.38) |
| Average rainy days | 3 | 3 | 3 | 4 | 14 | 18 | 23 | 25 | 22 | 15 | 8 | 4 | 142 |
Source: World Weather Online

== Demographics ==
Population census of Bugallon
| Year | Pop. | ±% p.a. |
|---|---|---|
| 1903 | 8,746 | — |
| 1918 | 10,289 | +1.09% |
| 1939 | 14,469 | +1.64% |
| 1948 | 18,687 | +2.88% |
| 1960 | 24,698 | +2.35% |
| 1970 | 31,657 | +2.51% |
| 1975 | 35,981 | +2.60% |
| 1980 | 39,072 | +1.66% |
| 1990 | 47,412 | +1.95% |
| 1995 | 50,478 | +1.18% |
| 2000 | 57,445 | +2.81% |
| 2007 | 62,237 | +1.11% |
| 2010 | 64,253 | +1.17% |
| 2015 | 67,348 | +0.90% |
| 2020 | 74,962 | +2.28% |
| 2024 | 76,027 | +0.34% |
Source: Philippine Statistics Authority

== Economy ==
Poverty incidence of Bugallon (%)

Source: Philippine Statistics Authority

=== Energy ===
The Bugallon Solar Power Project is a 550-megawatt (MW) of alternating current power station in Barangays Cayanga, Salomague Sur and Norte, covering 590 hectares.

== Government ==
=== Local government ===
Bugallon, belonging to the second congressional district of the province of Pangasinan, is governed by a mayor designated as its local chief executive and by a municipal council as its legislative body in accordance with the Local Government Code. The mayor, vice mayor, and the councilors are elected directly by the people through an election which is being held every three years.

=== Elected officials ===
Members of the Municipal Council (2019-2022)
| Position | Name |
|---|---|
| Congressman | Jumel Anthony I. Espino |
| Mayor | Priscilla I. Espino |
| Vice-Mayor | Winston P. Tandoc |
| Councilors | Rogelio M. Madriguera |
| Councilors | Aislinn L. De Guzman |
| Councilors | Marlon Y. Cuison |
| Councilors | Ernesto Agbisit |
| Councilors | Ramie T. Ocsan |
| Councilors | Gemma C. Hipol |
| Councilors | Bernardo F. De Vera |
| Councilors | Rolando A. Manaoat |

== Tourism ==
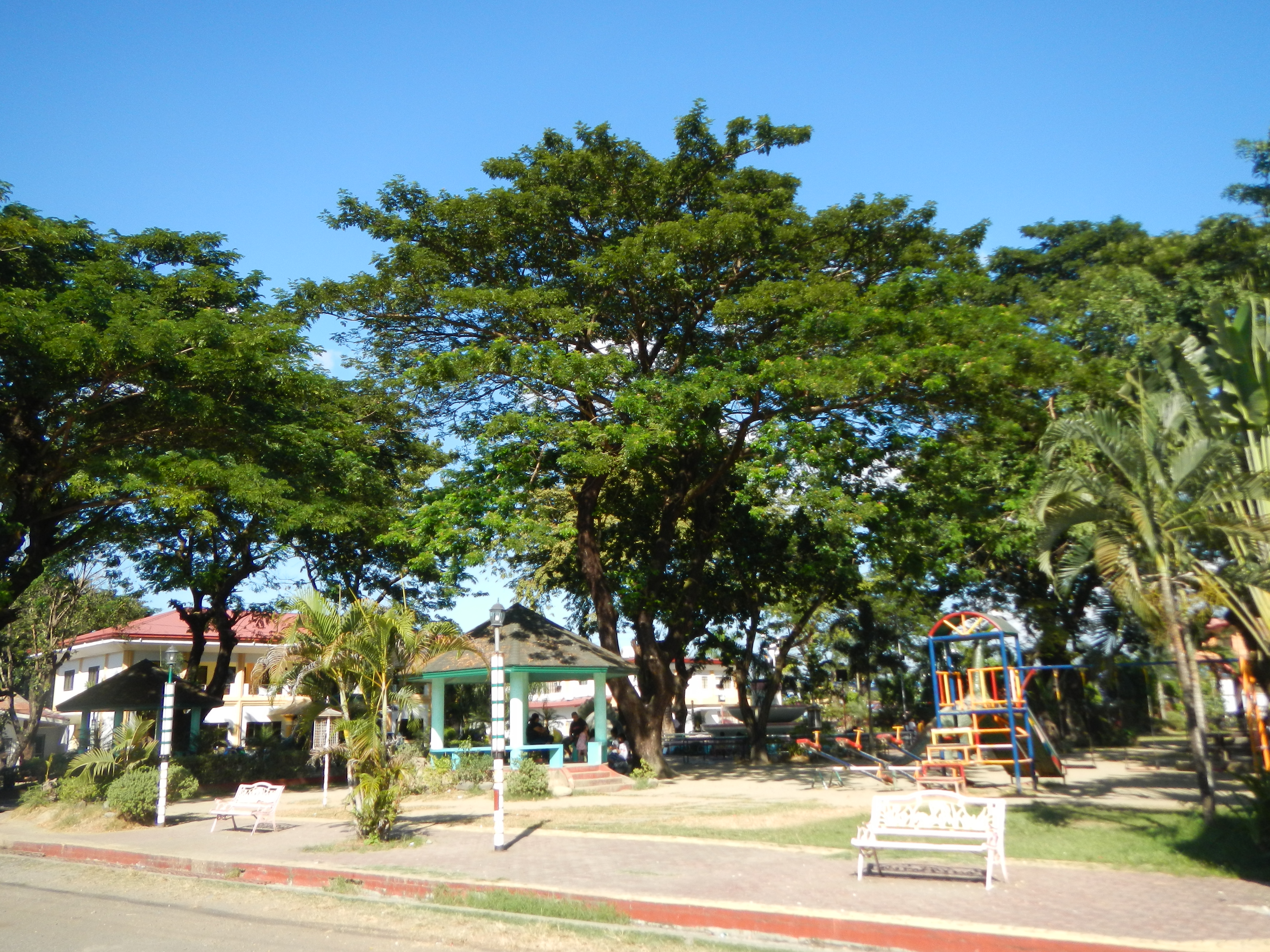
Park, Plaza

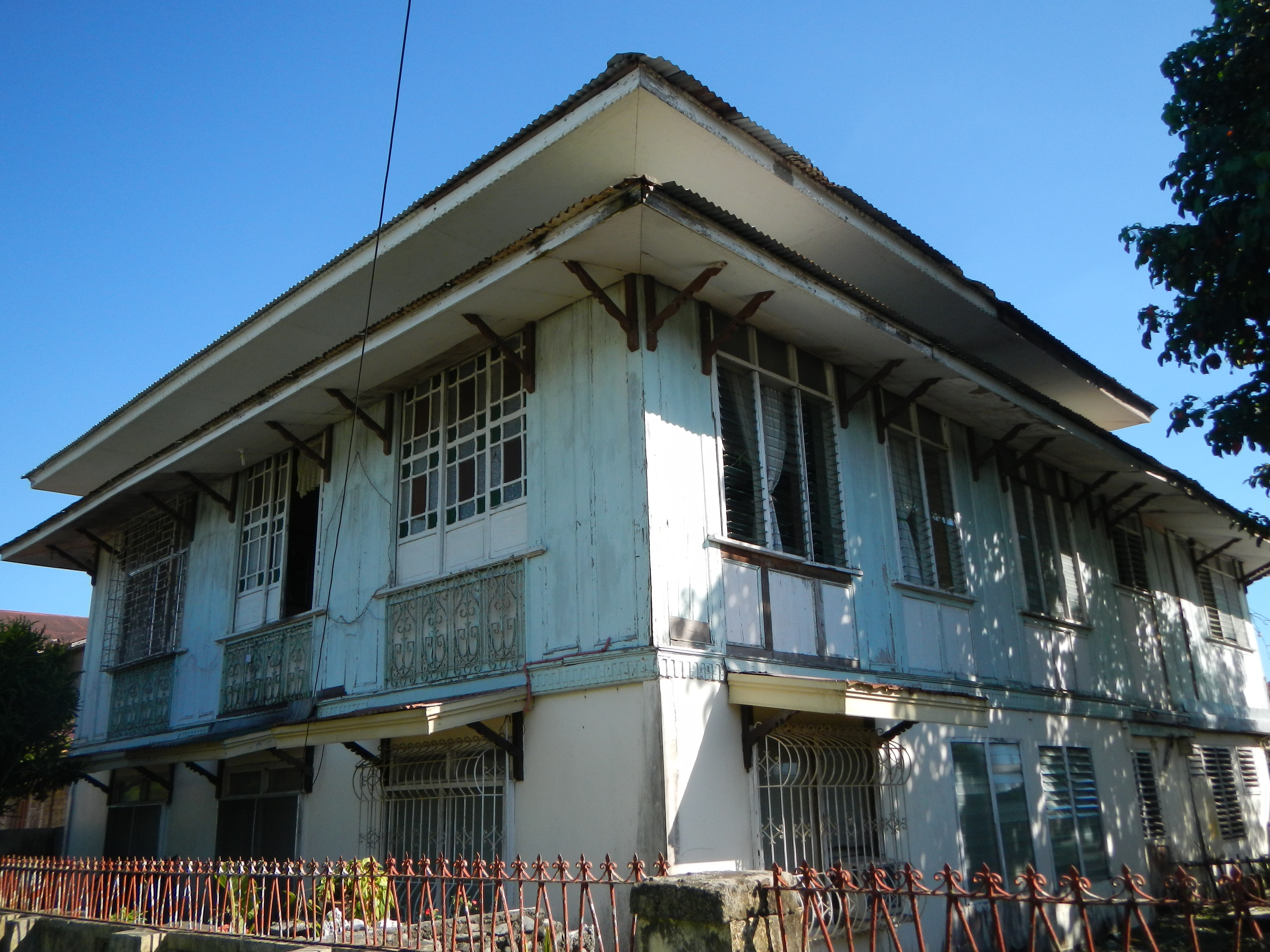
Heritage house (Atty. Agerico V. Guiang)

Bugallon's interesting points, destinations and products, events, include:

- Freedom Park, Town Hall, Church of Christ Philippine Theological College, Sangguniang Bayan Hall, National Building and Library, Municipal Auditorium, Gymmasium and Coop Canteen, Laguit Padilla Falls, Iglesia Ni Kristo, Hanging Bridge, Bubunga Dam, Gabion Type Dike, Lema Canal, Eco-Tourism Park, High Value Crop Organic Farm, Major Jose Torres Bugallon Park and Agricultural, Carabao Landmark.
- Rice, mango, antique home furnishings, vinegar, sawali products.
- Shrine of the Our Lady of Lourdes/Salasa Church (1720), Busay Waterfalls, Mt. Zion Pilgrim's Site, Biak-na-Bato Falls, Gen. Torres Bugallon Park.
- Carabao Festival -January 13, 2012 - 24 carabaos; "palengkera ang kalabaw" wasBarangay Cabayaoasan.
- The cascading waters of brooks and streams located in Barangays Cayanga, Portic, Hacienda, Laguit Padilla, Laguit Centro, San Francisco, Salomague Sur, Salomague Norte, Umanday and Gueset coming from the fresh water sources in the Zambales mountain slopes.
- Swimming pool, Sampaguita (formerly Primicias Farm, Barangay Portic).
- Nipa swamps, vinegar, and wine making industry from "tuba" (Barangays Salasa, Bañaga, Pantal, Asinan and Magtaking)
- Dam structures (NIA, Barangays Cayanga and Portic)
- Pangasinan State University Tissue Culture Project ( Congressman Amado Espino, Jr. farm, Barangay Portic.
- Monastery of the contemplative Hermits of the Living Word or Hermit sisters, Barangay Portic
- Agno River Flood Control River, Barangays Salasa and Bañaga, zigzagging bridge (Philippine-Japanese financed project)
- Vinegar industry of Barangays Asinan, Magtaking and Bañaga, Sawali making in Barangays Magtaking, Gueset and Laguit Padilla, Mango puree production, Candle making Factory, Barangay Pangascasan (Catro's) and in Poblacion (Tuliao's Candle Making Cottage Industry).
- Salasa Parish Church
- Bugallon Ecological Park.

=== St. Andrew the Apostle Parish Church ===
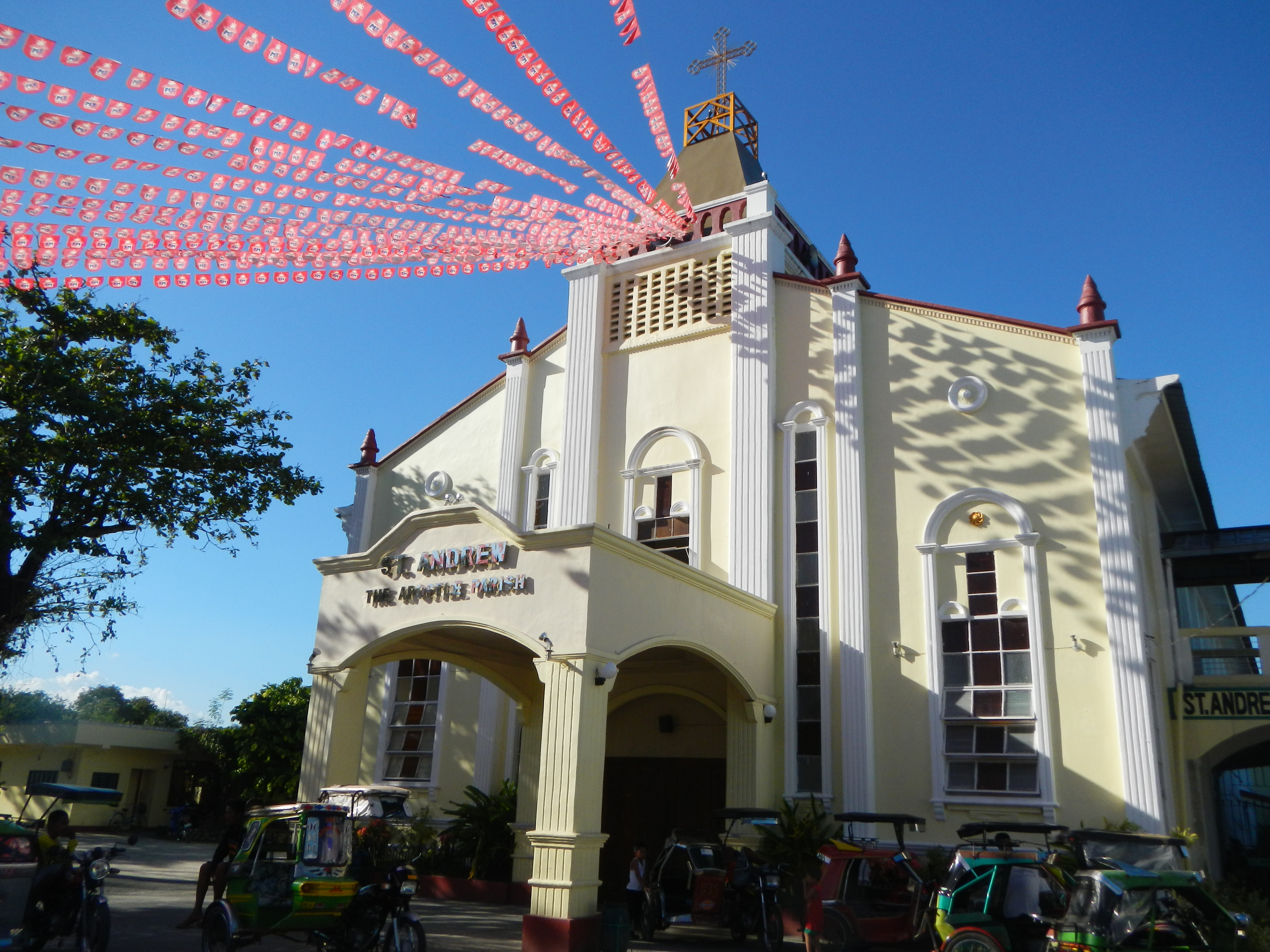
St. Andrew the Apostle Church

The 1920 St. Andrew the Apostle Parish Church is under the jurisdiction of the Roman Catholic Archdiocese of Lingayen-Dagupan, Roman Catholic Diocese of Alaminos. The church has impressive inspired-baroque type of altar for the saints.

Its Feast Day is November 30. It is part of the Vicariate of Our Lady of Lourdes.

St. Andrew the Apostle Parish was originally erected at Salasa (founded by the Dominicans in the 18th century). When the town site was transferred, the seat of the parish was also transferred as a consequence brought about by natural calamities that battered the area.

The 1914 Salasa floods destroyed crops, properties, buildings, the church and convent. Poblacion was transferred to Barangay Anagao (Bugallon), under Our Lady of Lourdes and St. Andrew the Apostle remained the patron Saint in July 1920 with 1st Parish Priest, Fr. Eustaquio Ocampo, then, Fr. Montano Domingo on November 29, 1921, and in June 1928, Fr Emeterio Domagas succeeded.

On May 23, 1929, Pangasinan was created as a new Diocese and Msgr. Cesar Maria Guerrero became Pangasinan's First Bishop on May 23, 1929. In 1930, Franciscan Capuchin appointed Fr. Cesario of Legario and Fr. Fernando of Erasum to Bugallon and Salasa, respectively on September 17, 1930. The Salasa Church, one of the biggest in Philippines, 100 meters long was completely destroyed and despoiled by Bugallon natives. Fr. Benjamin of Ilarduya became parish priest from October 16, 1933, to June 27, 1941. The church brick-structure and the old façade were built. During World War II, Fr. Hipolito Azcoita, parish priest of Labrador, was transferred to Bugallon. Father Fidel Lekamania added the convent, while Father Pedro V. Sison finished the rehabilitationof the Church.

== Education ==
There are two schools district Offices which govern all educational institutions within the municipality. These oversee the management and operations of all private and public elementary and high schools. Namely, Bugallon I Schools District Office, and Bugallon II Schools District Office.

=== Primary and elementary schools ===
- A.D. Learning Center
- Angarian Elementary School
- Asinan Elementary School
- Asuncion Elementary School
- Bañaga Elementary School
- Bolaoen Elementary School
- Buenlag Elementary School
- Bugallon Kidsworld Academy
- Cabayaoasan Elementary School
- Cayanga Elementary School
- Dimantal Elementary School
- Gueset Elementary School
- Hacienda Elementary School
- Jessan's School
- Laguit Centro Elementary School
- Laguit Padilla Elementary School
- Magsaysay Elementary School
- Magtaquing Elementary School
- Pangascasan Elementary School
- Polong Elementary School
- Salasa Elementary School
- Salincaoet Elementary School
- Salomague Norte Elementary School
- Salomague Sur Elementary School
- Samat Elementary School
- San Francisco Elementary School
- St. Andrew Catholic School
- Tococ Elementary School
- Torres-Bugallon Elementary School
- Umanday Central School

=== Secondary schools ===
- Bugallon Integrated School
- Irene Rayos Ombac National High School
- Polong National High School
- Portic Integrated School
- Salomague National High School

== Gallery ==
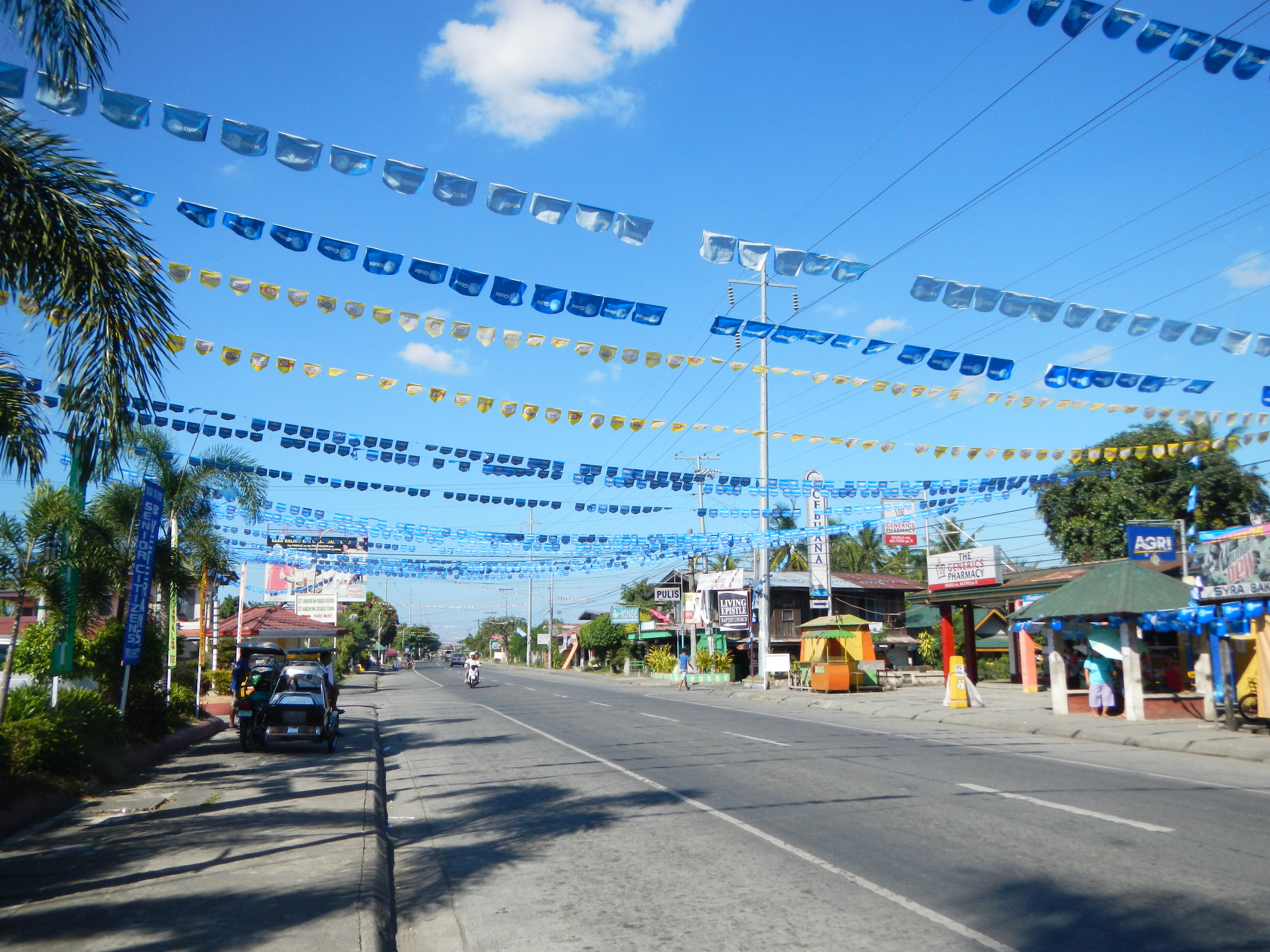
Town center

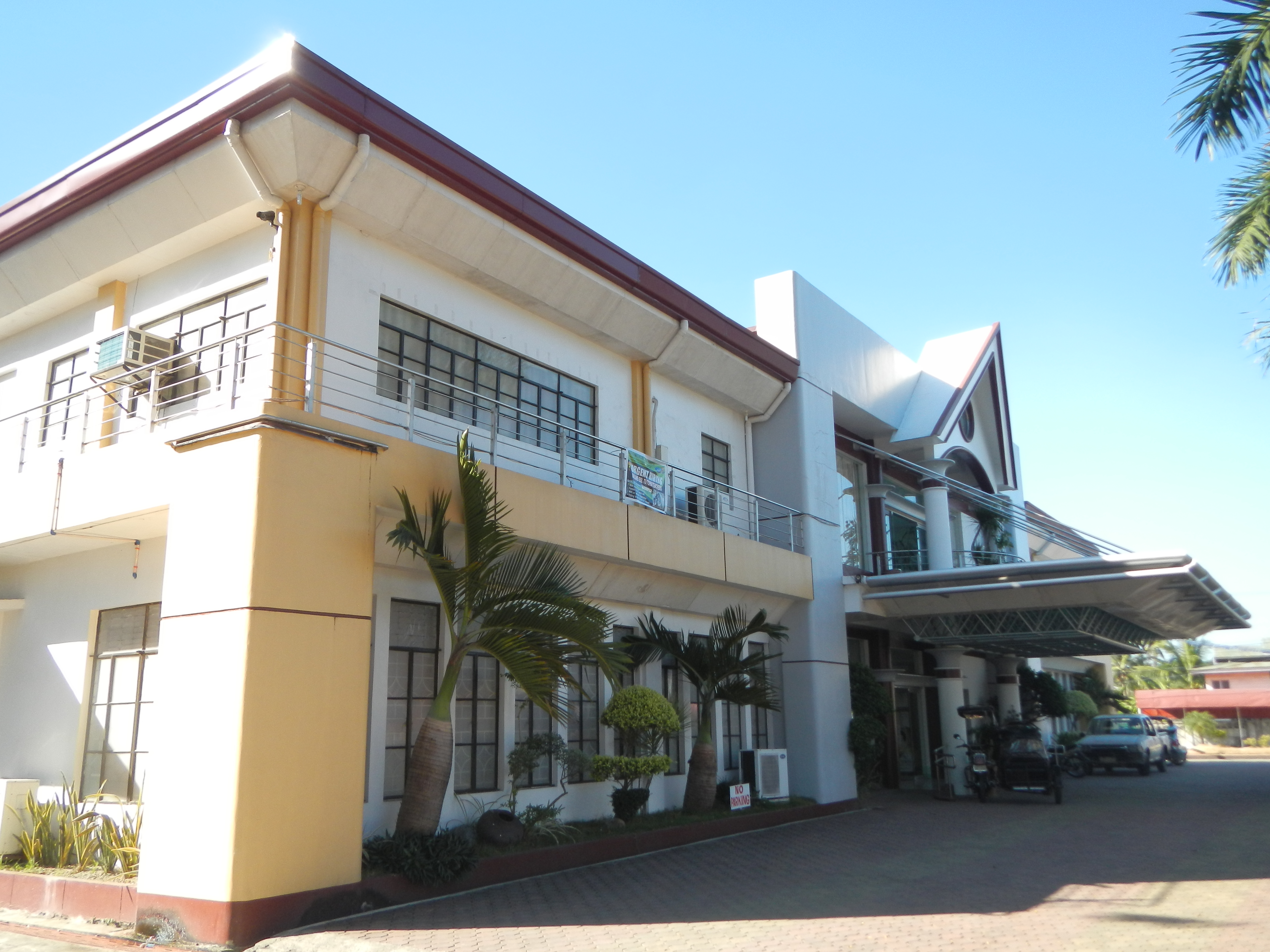
Town Hall

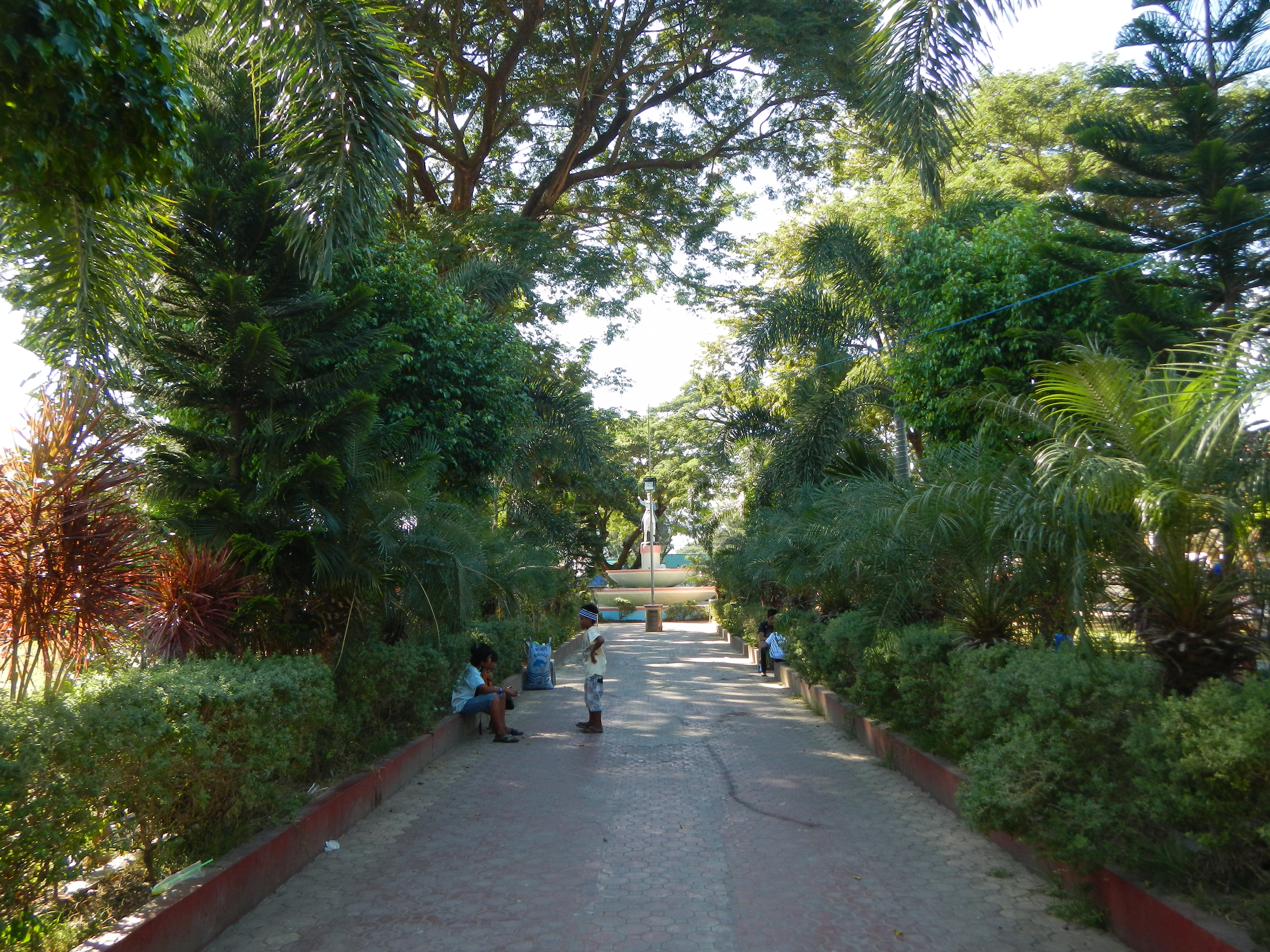
Major José Torres Bugallón Park

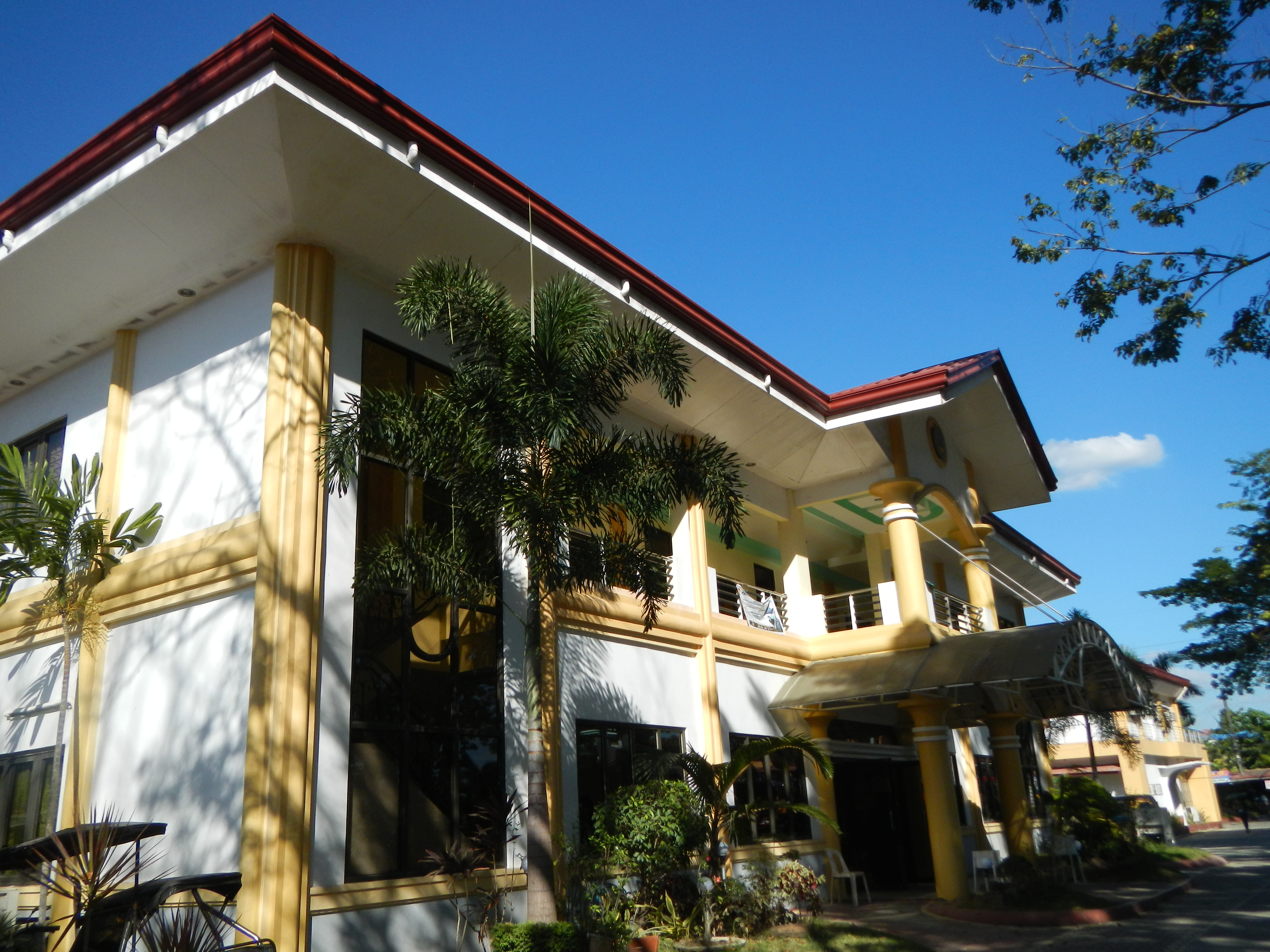
National Building and Library

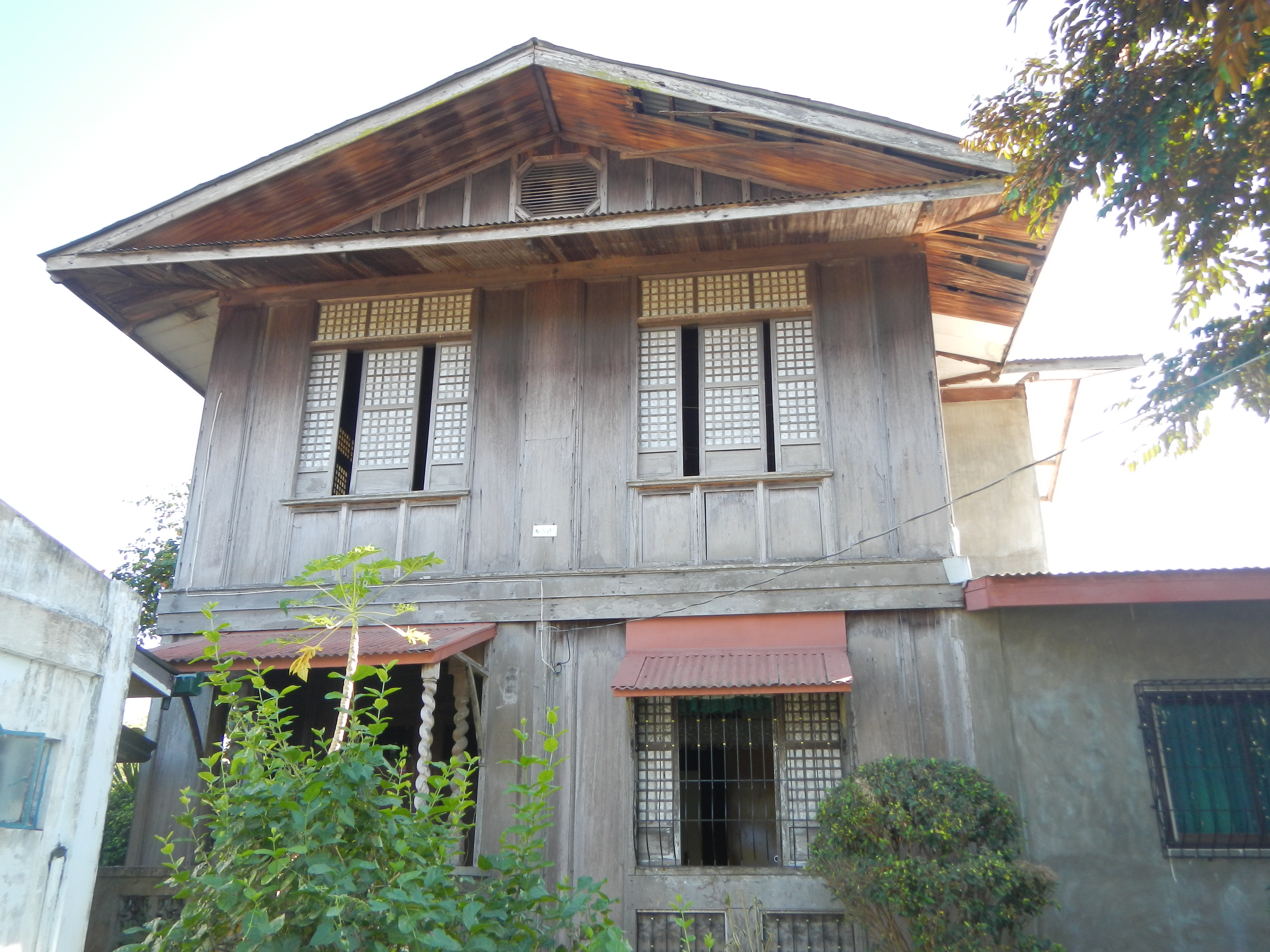
Old house (Generosa Espino)

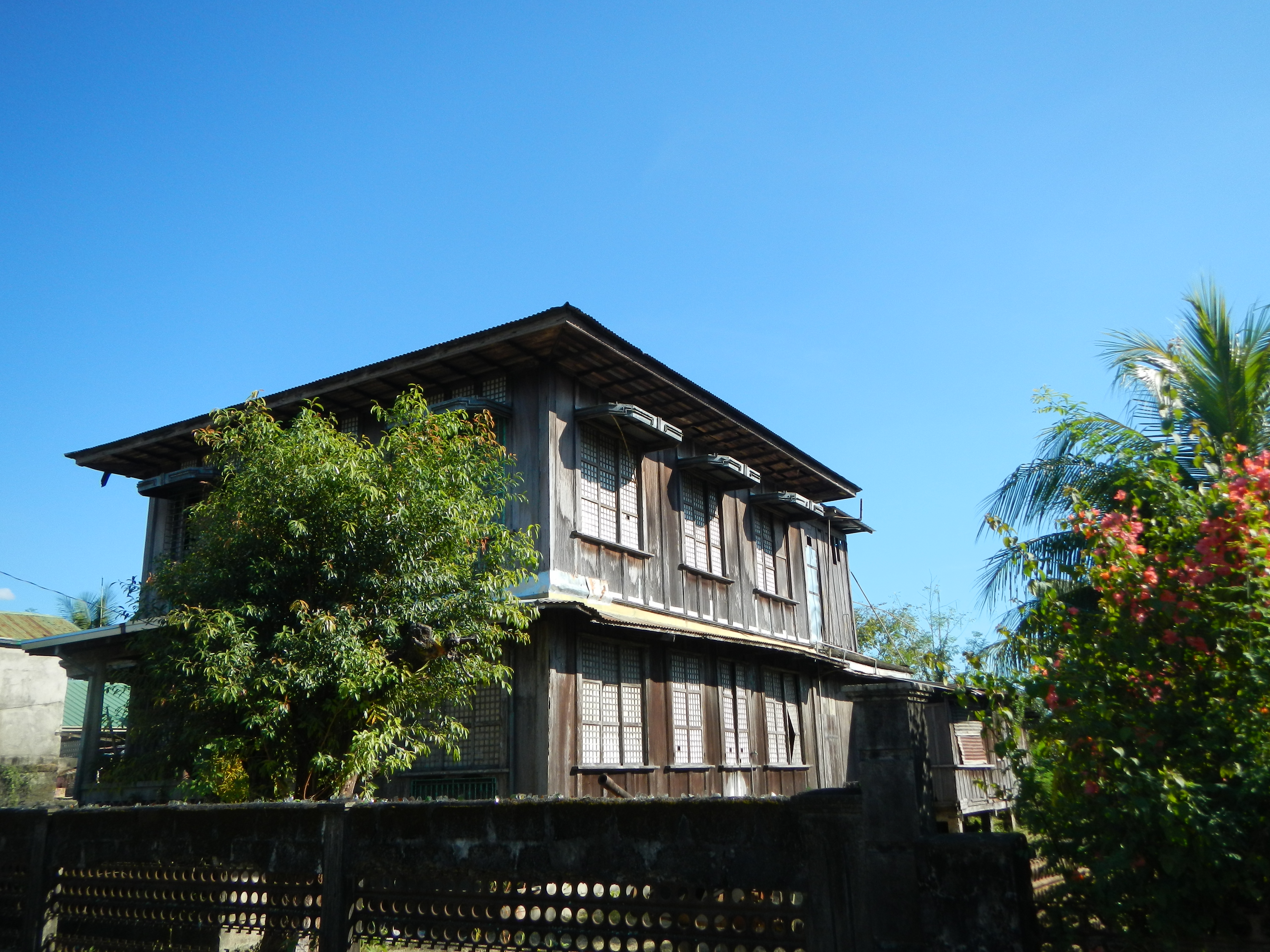
Heritage house (Generosa Espino)

== See also ==
- List of renamed cities and municipalities in the Philippines
