= List of barangays in Pangasinan =

The province of Pangasinan has 1,364 barangays comprising its 44 towns and 4 cities.

Pangasinan is ranked at 3rd with the most number of barangays in a Philippine province, only behind Iloilo and Leyte.

== Barangays ==
Most populous in its respective city or town (as of 2010)

Barangay	Population				City or Town
Barangay	2010	2007	2000	1990	City or Town
Abanon	1,867	1,818	1,716	1,222	San Carlos
Abonagan	1,380	1,400	1,189	938	Malasiqui
Abot Molina	1,600	1,383	1,300	1,126	Umingan
Acop	1,925	1,977	1,839	1,543	Rosales
Agat	1,284	1,347	1,166	868	Sison
Agdao	795	662	633	520	Malasiqui
Agdao	3,512	3,420	2,930	2,307	San Carlos
Agno	1,585	1,737	1,550	1,493	Tayug
Alac	3,418	3,314	3,174	2,736	San Quintin
Alacan	1,856	1,831	1,565	1,251	Malasiqui
Alacan	1,748	1,938	–	–	San Fabian
Aliaga	2,323	2,374	2,198	1,920	Malasiqui
Alibago	1,234	1,182	961	654	Santa Barbara
Alibeng	1,402	1,448	1,442	1,295	Sison
Alilao	410	427	344	255	Dasol
Alinggan	1,234	1,194	1,160	868	Bayambang
Alipangpang	5,596	5,599	3,810	2,942	Pozorrubio
Alitaya	4,160	4,147	3,450	2,684	Mangaldan
Aliwekwek	1,422	1,172	1,229	1,101	Lingayen
Allabon	912	765	765	735	Agno
Alo-o	1,254	1,113	1,029	820	Umingan
Aloleng	2,448	2,358	2,210	1,655	Agno
Alos	1,993	1,883	1,808	1,774	Alaminos
Amacalan	1,194	1,303	1,140	784	Malasiqui
Amagbagan	2,399	2,484	2,260	2,008	Pozorrubio
Amagbagan	710	681	675	424	Sison
Amalbalan	1,782	1,694	1,637	1,218	Dasol
Amanperez	1,095	836	956	754	Bayambang
Amamperez	4,782	4,262	4,149	3,777	Villasis
Amancoro	712	725	725	794	Binmaley
Amancosiling Norte	1,072	936	950	887	Bayambang
Amancosiling Sur	2,578	2,566	2,243	1,859	Bayambang
Amandiego	1,555	1,353	1,340	980	Alaminos
Amangbangan	1,153	1,070	1,047	1,033	Alaminos
Amanoaoac	1,642	1,604	1,593	1,357	Mapandan
Amansabina	2,387	2,124	2,031	1,623	Mangaldan
Amaronan	1,767	1,527	1,243	904	Umingan
Ambabaay	1,767	1,898	1,684	1,290	Bani
Ambalangan-Dalin	1,837	1,762	1,468	1,295	San Fabian
Ambayat I	836	821	793	581	Bayambang
Ambayat II	1,185	1,171	1,090	983	Bayambang
Ambonao	5,736	5,699	4,650	3,347	Calasiao
Ambuetel	2,760	2,640	2,395	1,920	Calasiao
Amistad	2,205	2,059	1,955	1,699	Tayug
Anambongan	2,944	2,478	2,317	2,220	Basista
Anando	932	731	747	636	San Carlos
Anapao (Bur Anapac)	351	449	419	372	Burgos
Andangin	819	906	890	621	Mangatarem
Angarian	1,514	1,500	1,369	1,041	Bugallon
Angatel	2,567	2,257	2,183	1,481	Urbiztondo
Angayan Norte	1,263	1,089	1,000	999	Balungao
Angayan Sur	645	526	439	437	Balungao
Angio	3,102	3,138	2,775	2,990	San Fabian
Anis	1,591	1,450	1,284	1,096	Laoac
Annam	617	605	576	440	Umingan
Ano	1,961	2,272	2,170	1,696	San Carlos
Anolid	1,095	1,141	1,039	865	Malasiqui
Anolid	6,507	6,582	5,242	4,314	Mangaldan
Anonang	3,948	3,734	3,735	3,416	San Fabian
Anonas	4,685	4,545	4,021	2,892	Urdaneta
Antipangol	1,775	1,505	1,453	1,121	San Carlos
Anulid	2,270	2,134	2,014	1,903	Alcala
Apalen	905	875	714	546	Bayambang
Apaya	1,901	1,860	1,684	1,411	Malasiqui
Apaya	1,496	1,332	1,289	994	Mapandan
Aponit	1,953	1,797	2,042	1,526	San Carlos
Aporao	634	670	647	694	Bani
Aramal	2,922	2,738	2,703	2,357	San Fabian
Arellano Street (Poblacion)	537	509	516	472	Mangatarem
Ariston Este	1,822	1,126	1,053	1,040	Asingan
Ariston Weste	3,009	3,051	2,780	2,424	Asingan
Arnedo	4,760	3,661	3,911	2,797	Bolinao
Artacho	975	1,004	875	693	Bautista
Artacho	1,097	1,245	1,121	921	Sison
Arwas	1,858	1,644	1,525	1,253	Bani
Asan Norte	2,191	2,246	1,852	1,570	Sison
Asan Sur	2,678	2,495	2,417	1,737	Sison
Aserda	1,167	1,062	949	805	Mapandan
Asin	488	528	455	417	Bayambang
Asin Este	2,676	2,541	2,358	1,804	Malasiqui
Asin Weste	849	964	927	748	Malasiqui
Asinan	1,879	1,881	1,743	1,405	Bugallon
Atainan	1,384	1,392	1,213	1,067	Alcala
Ataynan	1,413	1,082	935	791	Bayambang
Awag	1,769	1,549	1,171	974	Anda
Awai	1,082	975	890	718	San Jacinto
Awile	1,629	1,708	1,586	1,287	Anda
Baay	5,491	5,478	5,226	4,371	Lingayen
Babasit	5,334	5,168	4,635	3,874	Manaoag
Babuyan	524	515	369	–	Infanta
Bacabac	1,904	2,059	1,868	1,617	Bugallon
Bacag	5,721	5,346	5,097	4,595	Urdaneta
Bacayao Norte	3,283	2,176	1,566	1,874	Dagupan
Bacayao Sur	2,632	2,011	1,562	1,639	Dagupan
Bacnar	4,452	4,483	4,262	3,242	San Carlos
Bacnit	1,322	1,112	1,120	863	Mabini
Bacnono	2,017	1,695	1,882	1,439	Bayambang
Bactad East	1,976	1,930	1,726	1,445	Urdaneta
Bacundao Este	1,223	1,091	1,101	937	Malasiqui
Bacundao Weste	1,178	1,176	1,048	946	Malasiqui
Bagong Pag-asa (Poblacion East)	1,253	1,171	1,193	898	San Jacinto
Baguinay	2,118	1,960	1,655	1,497	Manaoag
Bakitbakit	899	860	774	624	Rosales
Bakitiw	2,115	1,967	1,836	1,449	Malasiqui
Bal-loy	648	541	533	401	Santa Maria
Balacag	1,047	744	710	606	Pozorrubio
Balagan	1,759	1,781	1,864	1,443	Binmaley
Balangay	1,383	1,323	1,397	1,013	Urbiztondo
Balangobong	1,660	1,560	1,458	1,230	Alaminos
Balangobong	1,418	1,493	1,388	1,151	Binalonan
Balangobong	1,400	1,336	1,172	1,132	Lingayen
Balaya	1,909	1,535	1,528	1,227	San Carlos
Balayang	1,341	1,030	951	799	Alaminos
Balaybuaya	1,935	1,215	1,613	1,260	Bayambang
Balayong	1,582	1,479	1,241	1,033	San Carlos
Baldog	1,821	1,885	1,829	1,377	San Carlos
Baleyadaan	1,577	1,465	1,364	913	Alaminos
Baligayan	998	914	1,036	1,033	San Quintin
Balingasay	4,310	4,149	3,442	2,548	Bolinao
Balingcanaway	1,463	1,448	1,223	1,066	Rosales
Balingueo	3,375	3,182	2,689	2,117	Santa Barbara
Balite	980	1,020	911	656	Malasiqui
Balite Sur	3,241	3,216	2,972	2,368	San Carlos
Ballag	1,092	873	919	776	Bani
Balligi	1,129	1,071	1,093	1,030	Laoac
Balococ	2,095	2,125	1,899	1,598	Lingayen
Balococ	1,757	1,642	1,637	1,218	San Carlos
Balogo	1,962	2,158	2,126	1,971	Binmaley
Baloling	3,755	3,727	3,446	2,866	Mapandan
Baluyot	3,229	3,145	–	2,446	Bautista
Bamban	2,850	2,814	2,575	1,910	Infanta
Banaban	1,725	1,564	1,467	1,220	Bayambang
Banaga	1,904	2,018	1,875	1,586	Bugallon
Banaoang	5,184	4,031	3,146	3,224	Calasiao
Banaoang	4,958	3,143	3,909	2,550	Mangaldan
Banaoang	4,450	4,418	3,857	3,469	Santa Barbara
Banawang	2,461	2,469	2,211	1,718	Malasiqui
Banding	790	874	664	346	Pozorrubio
Bangan-Oda	3,705	3,277	3,198	2,884	Agno
Bani	2,610	2,396	2,146	1,675	Bayambang
Bani	732	605	716	521	San Carlos
Banog Norte	2,132	1,978	1,787	1,820	Bani
Banog Sur	1,378	1,573	1,636	1,311	Bani
Bantay	539	424	384	296	Mangatarem
Bantay Insik	1,345	1,330	1,198	976	Sison
Bantayan	1,181	1,051	1,043	927	Lingayen
Bantayan	3,408	3,547	3,050	2,667	Mangaldan
Bantocaling	1,343	1,276	1,201	869	Mangatarem
Bantog	4,217	4,114	3,804	3,171	Asingan
Bantog	1,310	1,219	885	653	San Quintin
Bantog	1,154	1,056	910	760	Santa Maria
Bantug	2,059	1,896	1,576	1,205	Umingan
Bantugan	966	960	816	715	Pozorrubio
Banuar	1,910	1,988	1,963	1,774	Laoac
Banzal	1,365	1,326	1,129	1,001	Santa Barbara
Baquioen	2,444	2,241	1,490	1,333	Sual
Baracbac	1,210	1,215	935	701	Mangatarem
Baracbac	818	748	759	494	Umingan
Barang	1,894	1,944	1,810	1,380	Malasiqui
Barangay A (Poblacion)	2,326	2,279	2,159	2,466	Tayug
Barangay B (Poblacion)	1,372	1,240	1,544	1,212	Tayug
Barangay C (Poblacion)	1,538	1,559	1,591	1,602	Tayug
Barangay D (Poblacion)	1,523	1,582	1,517	1,568	Tayug
Barangay I (T. Bugallon)	673	741	619	893	Dagupan
Barangay II (Nueva)	2,824	2,158	2,549	3,128	Dagupan
Barangay IV (Zamora)	841	985	1,217	1,275	Dagupan
Barangobong	764	727	638	575	Natividad
Barangobong	1,734	1,556	1,427	1,096	Tayug
Barangobong	3,501	3,564	3,372	2,887	Urdaneta
Barat	2,268	2,081	1,796	1,674	Umingan
Bari	5,925	5,223	4,589	3,478	Mangaldan
Baritao	4,637	4,216	3,675	2,748	Manaoag
Barlo	1,307	1,146	1,025	639	Mabini
Baro	2,321	2,491	2,689	2,164	Asingan
Barraca	1,891	1,714	1,550	1,245	Urdaneta
Baruan	1,584	1,598	1,526	1,046	Agno
Basing	2,065	2,071	2,190	1,878	Binmaley
Basing	2,504	2,388	1,983	1,676	Lingayen
Batakil	2,748	2,699	2,317	1,961	Pozorrubio
Batang	1,338	1,270	1,172	925	Infanta
Batangcaoa	1,664	1,548	1,335	1,118	Urbiztondo
Batangcawa	1,092	1,013	974	749	Bayambang
Batchelor East	1,236	1,104	1,112	1,097	Natividad
Batchelor West	1,148	931	1,075	1,005	Natividad
Bateng	2,501	2,453	2,129	1,758	Mangaldan
Batiarao	1,610	1,397	1,430	1,082	Anda
Baug	1,492	1,354	1,193	1,137	Urbiztondo
Bawer	634	709	676	423	Malasiqui
Bayambang	2,352	2,376	1,670	1,258	Infanta
Bayaoas	1,982	1,913	1,641	1,204	Aguilar
Bayaoas	3,834	3,066	2,837	2,312	Urbiztondo
Bayaoas	5,562	5,506	5,471	4,241	Urdaneta
Baybay	3,259	2,968	2,696	2,714	Aguilar
Baybay Lopez	2,447	2,226	1,934	1,586	Binmaley
Baybay Norte	1,240	1,210	1,106	1,036	Sual
Baybay Polong	2,577	2,537	2,311	1,849	Binmaley
Baybay Sur	1,382	1,297	1,283	873	Sual
Bayoyong	1,731	1,708	1,586	1,340	Basista
Bega	1,901	1,601	1,328	1,150	San Carlos
Beleng	1,613	1,344	1,253	1,149	Bayambang
Bensican	660	624	584	523	San Nicolas
Bersamin	3,277	3,041	2,896	2,299	Alcala
Bical Norte	2,726	2,703	2,090	1,610	Bayambang
Bical Sur	1,514	1,224	1,195	787	Bayambang
Biec	3,272	3,236	2,909	2,297	Binmaley
Bigbiga	1,107	926	897	791	San Fabian
Bila	1,524	1,552	1,502	1,381	Sison
Binabalian	3,608	3,522	3,052	2,847	Bolinao
Binalay	1,231	1,097	956	747	Malasiqui
Binday	2,120	1,866	2,069	1,591	San Fabian
Binmeckeg	1,587	1,571	1,503	1,274	Sison
Bisal	1,656	1,565	1,371	930	Manaoag
Bisocol	2,196	1,871	1,309	1,067	Alaminos
Bituag	1,816	1,767	1,469	985	Urbiztondo
Bobon	959	802	834	633	Malasiqui
Bobonan	1,230	1,271	1,086	1,027	Asingan
Bobonan	2,695	2,496	2,271	2,107	Pozorrubio
Bobonot	1,331	1,254	1,190	825	Dasol
Boboy	3,101	2,847	2,422	1,891	Agno
Bocacliw	2,710	2,451	2,115	1,863	Aguilar
Bocboc	1,017	998	1,137	960	San Carlos
Bocboc East	2,565	2,407	2,396	2,032	Aguilar
Bocboc West	1,678	1,546	1,353	1,100	Aguilar
Bogaoan	2,025	2,169	2,265	1,825	San Carlos
Bogtong Bolo	835	782	807	604	Mangatarem
Bogtong Bunao	840	740	678	432	Mangatarem
Bogtong Centro	417	389	438	335	Mangatarem
Bogtong Niog	521	500	437	321	Mangatarem
Bogtong Silag	1,662	1,513	1,340	1,119	Mangatarem
Bolaney	1,628	1,340	1,606	1,098	Alaminos
Bolaoen	2,053	2,161	1,864	1,447	Bugallon
Bolaoen	1,118	1,050	971	798	San Fabian
Bolaoen	871	797	779	587	Sual
Bolaoen	1,326	1,180	1,067	934	Urdaneta
Bolaoit	2,543	2,389	2,208	1,703	Malasiqui
Bolasi	2,910	2,779	2,253	1,698	San Fabian
Bolingit	2,940	2,705	2,376	1,600	San Carlos
Bolintaguen	1,693	1,550	1,426	1,174	San Quintin
Bolo	3,342	3,365	2,576	1,996	Labrador
Bolo	1,393	1,424	1,024	821	San Jacinto
Bolosan	1,731	1,559	1,375	1,045	San Carlos
Bolosan	3,862	3,187	3,095	3,005	Dagupan
Bongalon	2,041	2,094	2,018	1,521	Labrador
Bongar	1,870	1,853	1,736	1,425	Malasiqui
Bongato East	1,908	2,010	1,656	1,282	Bayambang
Bongato West	760	694	747	526	Bayambang
Bonifacio (Poblacion)	651	576	582	708	San Carlos
Bonuan Binloc	8,246	7,507	6,078	4,071	Dagupan
Bonuan Boquig	13,686	10,852	10,024	7,865	Dagupan
Bonuan Gueset	22,042	20,335	14,837	14,855	Dagupan
Botao	3,088	3,000	2,516	2,028	Santa Barbara
Botique	846	843	844	710	Laoac
Buaya	390	381	325	201	Mangatarem
Buayaen	2,961	2,556	2,460	1,991	Bayambang
Bucao	1,706	1,487	1,268	990	Manaoag
Bued	3,016	2,791	2,286	1,799	Alaminos
Bued	2,839	2,745	2,213	1,997	Binalonan
Bued	6,453	5,941	5,500	4,865	Calasiao
Buenavista	563	554	545	560	Umingan
Buenglat	1,518	1,574	1,598	1,191	San Carlos
Buenlag	2,796	2,934	2,744	2,532	Binmaley
Buenlag	1,726	1,474	1,480	1,192	Bugallon
Buenlag	7,678	7,264	6,698	5,683	Calasiao
Buenlag	3,662	3,257	3,161	2,388	Mangaldan
Buenlag	728	636	594	413	Mangatarem
Buenlag 1st	994	820	808	670	Bayambang
Buenlag 2nd	1,559	1,484	1,322	1,196	Bayambang
Bueno	766	740	751	571	Mangatarem
Buer	3,167	3,124	2,857	2,224	Aguilar
Bugallon-Posadas Street (Poblacion)	730	773	726	852	San Carlos
Bugayong	2,949	2,900	2,693	2,379	Binalonan
Bulaoen East	902	919	885	664	Sison
Bulaoen West	1,000	912	880	707	Sison
Bunagan	490	477	422	213	Mangatarem
Buneg	1,730	1,852	1,507	1,399	Pozorrubio
Bunlalacao	1,051	993	918	738	Mangatarem
Burgos (San Narciso)	904	722	766	651	Natividad
Burgos Padlan (Poblacion)	1,398	1,326	1,292	1,089	San Carlos
Burgos Street (Poblacion)	958	700	862	887	Mangatarem
Butao	1,023	993	909	772	Malasiqui
Caabiangaan	869	808	815	676	Mabini
Caaringayan	1,168	1,105	1,123	950	Laoac
Cabacaraan	1,820	1,891	1,754	1,475	San Manuel
Cabalaoangan	3,188	2,909	2,474	2,109	San Quintin
Cabalaoangan Norte	1,696	1,850	1,501	1,323	Rosales
Cabalaoangan Sur	2,251	2,001	1,949	1,678	Rosales
Cabalitian	2,517	2,201	2,085	1,835	Asingan
Cabalitian	801	707	680	565	Sual
Cabalitian	886	786	792	804	Umingan
Cabaluyan 1st	570	500	472	393	Mangatarem
Cabaluyan 2nd	1,040	868	681	516	Mangatarem
Cabanaetan	1,398	1,510	1,432	1,297	Mabini
Cabanbanan	3,851	3,692	3,104	2,610	Manaoag
Cabangaran	1,448	1,350	1,351	1,024	San Quintin
Cabangaran	980	898	808	711	Umingan
Cabarabuan	867	817	742	718	Mangatarem
Cabaritan	2,017	1,827	1,699	1,244	San Manuel
Cabaritan	1,547	1,444	1,356	1,019	Sison
Cabaruan	528	469	431	327	Mangatarem
Cabaruan	1,422	1,285	–	–	San Fabian
Cabaruan	1,033	1,072	961	686	Umingan
Cabaruan	2,138	2,068	1,832	1,507	Urdaneta
Cabatling	2,516	2,177	2,303	1,815	Malasiqui
Cabatuan	1,698	1,456	1,392	1,171	Alaminos
Cabatuan	1,328	1,268	1,135	884	Umingan
Cabayaoasan	1,597	1,586	1,371	902	Bugallon
Cabayaoasan	1,201	1,189	1,153	859	Mangatarem
Cabayugan	670	643	574	528	Mangatarem
Cabeldetan	2,440	2,044	2,217	2,186	Basista
Cabilaoan West	1,796	1,754	1,611	1,260	Laoac
Cabilocaan	2,581	2,546	2,302	1,750	Calasiao
Cabinuangan	1,372	1,454	1,346	1,197	Mabini
Cabitnongan	1,232	1,280	1,121	863	San Nicolas
Cablong	1,667	1,874	1,485	1,202	Pozorrubio
Cablong	1,901	2,091	1,861	1,337	Santa Barbara
Caboloan	932	788	761	652	San Nicolas
Caboluan	687	654	630	523	Santa Maria
Cabuaan	1,416	1,419	1,343	1,111	Bautista
Cabueldatan	689	629	556	555	Malasiqui
Cabulalaan	1,089	1,038	849	703	Laoac
Cabuloan	3,054	2,989	2,718	2,306	Urdaneta
Cabungan	3,167	2,823	2,830	2,196	Anda
Cabuyao	2,583	2,375	1,916	1,473	Bolinao
Cacabugaoan	1,338	1,304	1,241	1,138	San Nicolas
Cacandongan	813	746	706	562	Bautista
Cacandungan	1,351	1,222	1,150	948	Natividad
Cacaoiten	591	619	614	357	Mangatarem
Cacaritan	2,184	2,057	2,011	1,642	San Carlos
Cacayasen	1,314	1,311	1,164	937	Burgos
Cadiz	950	816	748	718	Umingan
Cadre Site	2,538	2,247	2,105	1,721	Bayambang
Caingal	1,410	1,167	1,175	794	San Carlos
Cal-litang	2,083	2,011	1,799	1,587	Santa Maria
Calabeng	957	876	744	520	Bani
Calanutan (Don Felix Coloma)	1,203	1,092	963	839	Rosales
Calanutian	485	479	392	203	San Nicolas
Calaoagan	1,075	1,027	960	694	Laoac
Calaocan	1,908	1,863	1,663	1,315	Manaoag
Calaocan	1,075	1,025	971	787	San Nicolas
Calapugan	1,222	1,142	1,054	952	Natividad
Calbueg	1,397	1,679	1,806	1,328	Malasiqui
Calepaan	3,890	3,540	3,644	2,853	Asingan
Calit	2,221	2,272	1,646	1,201	Binmaley
Calitlitan	741	731	476	584	Umingan
Calmay	1,688	1,634	1,556	1,252	Laoac
Calmay	6,706	5,386	4,730	4,716	Dagupan
Calobaoan	3,320	3,039	2,895	2,246	San Carlos
Calomboyan	3,168	3,000	2,599	2,388	San Carlos
Calomboyan	1,961	1,821	1,846	1,686	San Quintin
Caloocan Dupo	1,046	989	911	717	Binmaley
Caloocan Norte	2,718	2,525	2,626	2,120	Binmaley
Caloocan Sur	3,520	3,326	3,235	2,602	Binmaley
Calsib	2,535	2,300	1,996	1,705	Aguilar
Calumboyan Norte	517	457	369	321	Mangatarem
Calumboyan Sur	799	1,012	683	494	Mangatarem
Calumbuyan	617	554	516	437	Sual
Calunetan	824	678	668	543	Sison
Calvo (Poblacion)	1,010	976	997	928	Mangatarem
Calzada	1,821	1,831	1,628	1,446	Mabini
Camagsingalan	1,665	1,632	1,450	1,095	Sual
Camaley	2,374	2,181	2,125	1,920	Binmaley
Camambugan	1,317	1,159	1,067	908	Urbiztondo
Camanang	3,968	3,356	2,986	2,402	Urdaneta
Camangaan	1,133	1,074	1,032	900	Binalonan
Camangaan	1,080	1,057	808	712	Rosales
Camangaan	1,021	1,026	1,007	787	Sison
Camanggaan	581	600	540	442	San Nicolas
Camantiles	5,825	4,907	4,849	3,725	Urdaneta
Camindoroan	532	542	489	491	San Nicolas
Canan Norte	1,875	1,580	1,531	1,296	Malasiqui
Canan Sur	1,090	1,044	1,041	803	Malasiqui
Canaoalan	3,608	3,553	3,706	3,187	Binmaley
Canarem	1,093	1,035	890	735	Natividad
Canarvacanan	1,691	1,554	1,351	1,352	Alcala
Canarvacanan	1,811	2,064	1,747	1,253	Binalonan
Caoayan	2,347	2,128	1,935	1,465	Sual
Caoayan-Kiling	3,979	3,253	3,434	2,759	San Carlos
Capandanan	2,388	2,236	2,278	1,728	Lingayen
Capandanan	857	842	726	652	Santa Maria
Capantolan	1,589	1,527	1,298	860	Sual
Capaoay (Poblacion)	2,521	2,565	2,250	2,107	San Jacinto
Capas	2,065	1,950	1,804	1,480	Binalonan
Capas	1,014	894	868	700	Umingan
Capataan	2,120	1,979	1,798	1,260	San Carlos
Capitan Tomas	1,358	1,143	1,006	808	Rosales
Capulaan	1,027	946	877	709	Balungao
Capulaan	3,073	2,980	2,729	2,555	Urdaneta
Carael	4,732	4,368	4,868	3,988	Dagupan
Caramutan	3,407	3,358	3,259	2,875	Urdaneta
Caranglaan	1,082	913	892	847	Alcala
Caranglaan	1,456	1,388	1,389	1,192	Mabini
Caranglaan	6,459	7,848	6,751	5,379	Dagupan
Carayacan	1,484	1,504	1,260	1,273	San Quintin
Carayungan Sur	938	890	690	535	Umingan
Carmay East	2,901	2,706	2,418	1,923	Rosales
Carmay West	766	726	679	503	Rosales
Carmen East	3,671	3,830	3,824	3,358	Rosales
Carmen West	2,734	2,802	2,563	2,476	Rosales
Carosalesan	1,180	1,024	936	777	Umingan
Carosucan Norte	3,906	3,983	3,697	3,125	Asingan
Carosucan Sur	3,084	3,074	2,857	2,480	Asingan
Carot	3,125	2,874	2,719	2,358	Anda
Carriedo	2,365	2,160	2,335	1,898	Tayug
Carungay	1,168	1,096	1,058	913	Bayambang
Carusocan	1,671	1,498	1,265	951	Santa Barbara
Casampagaan	839	826	817	717	Laoac
Casanestebanan	629	648	544	415	Laoac
Casanfernandoan	1,065	847	911	823	Pozorrubio
Casanicolasan	1,032	1,035	958	789	Rosales
Casantaan	1,506	1,464	1,308	1,188	Urdaneta
Casantamarian	1,800	1,643	1,543	1,361	San Quintin
Casantiagoan	1,489	1,320	1,390	1,081	Laoac
Casaratan	1,128	1,066	1,064	909	San Nicolas
Casibong	2,241	2,255	2,053	1,407	San Jacinto
Casilagan	1,343	1,228	1,297	995	Mangatarem
Casilan	576	555	518	429	Umingan
Castaño	922	876	738	664	Pozorrubio
Catablan	5,547	5,352	4,710	3,474	Urdaneta
Catarataraan	356	361	293	204	Mangatarem
Cato	4,585	4,602	4,191	2,880	Infanta
Catuday	2,374	2,219	1,988	1,514	Bolinao
Catungi	1,671	1,309	1,160	767	Bolinao
Caturay	1,300	1,387	1,378	1,076	Bayambang
Caturay Norte	717	777	703	583	Mangatarem
Caturay Sur	855	774	762	616	Mangatarem
Cauplasan	972	965	831	732	Santa Maria
Caurdanetaan	1,937	1,648	1,764	1,243	Umingan
Cauringan	1,509	1,440	1,311	1,113	Sison
Caviernesan	1,090	1,100	865	502	Mangatarem
Cawayan Bogtong	2,809	2,540	2,387	2,064	Malasiqui
Cayambanan	3,441	3,474	3,411	2,890	Urdaneta
Cayanga	2,567	2,570	2,018	1,513	Bugallon
Cayanga	4,511	4,435	4,335	2,985	San Fabian
Cayucay	1,553	1,409	1,331	1,029	Alaminos
Cayungnan	2,054	1,652	1,926	1,731	Agno
Centro Toma	1,950	2,009	1,712	1,472	Bani
Cili	1,921	1,948	1,712	1,535	Binalonan
Cobol	3,420	3,209	2,774	2,334	San Carlos
Colayo	1,624	1,734	1,280	1,279	Bani
Coldit	1,725	1,630	1,672	1,361	Asingan
Coliling	1,854	1,725	1,592	1,327	Rosales
Coliling	4,479	4,416	4,001	3,341	San Carlos
Colisao	812	660	626	480	San Fabian
Concepcion	826	776	607	576	Umingan
Concordia	924	1,082	1,070	807	Burgos
Concordia (Poblacion)	3,978	3,672	3,327	2,907	Bolinao
Consolacion	1,364	1,492	1,132	888	Urdaneta
Coral	1,303	1,222	1,208	912	Mapandan
Crisanto Lichauco	1,123	998	1,008	806	Tayug
Cruz	1,653	1,380	1,307	1,262	San Carlos
Culang	1,495	1,243	1,260	968	Bolinao
Curareng	576	543	532	402	Alcala
Dacap Norte	985	942	838	712	Bani
Dacap Sur	2,048	2,024	1,940	1,465	Bani
Dalangiring	5,683	5,650	5,220	4,577	Urbiztondo
Dalayap	1,092	1,085	969	765	Santa Maria
Dalongue	1,880	1,723	1,487	1,223	Santa Barbara
Dalumpinas	1,439	1,402	1,359	1,114	San Nicolas
Dangley	570	530	526	402	Agno
Darawey (Tangal)	1,144	993	880	724	Bayambang
David	4,275	3,714	3,687	2,893	Mangaldan
De Guzman	1,643	1,717	1,369	1,166	Mabini
Decreto	515	505	480	431	Umingan
Del Rosario	352	355	362	289	Umingan
Dewey	1,978	1,861	2,035	1,845	Bolinao
Diaz	4,068	3,817	3,717	2,776	Bautista
Diaz	1,399	1,181	1,022	872	Umingan
Diket	921	985	956	731	Umingan
Dilan	3,684	3,375	3,730	2,871	Pozorrubio
Dilan Paurido	6,190	5,464	5,056	3,487	Urdaneta
Dinalaoan	3,562	3,114	3,231	2,595	Calasiao
Dolaoan	2,086	1,969	1,737	1,416	Anda
Doliman	1,351	1,206	1,162	887	Infanta
Domalandan Center	2,145	1,965	1,969	1,713	Lingayen
Domalandan East	2,379	2,405	2,478	2,352	Lingayen
Domalandan West	2,564	2,425	2,599	2,366	Lingayen
Domanpot	5,445	5,201	4,941	4,212	Asingan
Domingo Alarcio (Cabilaoan East)	1,307	1,276	1,037	918	Laoac
Don Antonio Village	860	907	819	769	Rosales
Don Benito	1,407	1,273	1,258	1,016	Pozorrubio
Don Justo Abalos (Caroan)	1,106	920	839	486	Umingan
Don Matias	1,481	1,400	1,074	777	Burgos
Don Montano	2,162	2,024	1,828	1,532	Umingan
Don Pedro	2,971	3,071	2,641	2,337	Malasiqui
Dorongan	366	358	632	667	Lingayen
Dorongan Ketaket	949	729	767	593	Mangatarem
Dorongan Linmansangan	147	122	125	29	Mangatarem
Dorongan Punta	1,802	1,575	1,449	1,182	Mangatarem
Dorongan Sawat	1,761	1,370	1,351	1,069	Mangatarem
Dorongan Valerio	1,860	1,519	1,245	1,107	Mangatarem
Doyong	3,459	2,883	3,144	2,475	Calasiao
Doyong	1,903	1,711	1,673	1,340	San Carlos
Dr. Pedro T. Orata (Bactad Proper)	1,814	1,889	1,614	1,384	Urdaneta
Duera	1,061	1,088	960	758	Bayambang
Dulacac	1,231	1,123	1,170	978	Alaminos
Dulag	2,615	2,658	2,533	2,327	Binmaley
Dulag	1,447	1,162	1,250	1,386	Lingayen
Dulig	2,440	2,385	2,380	1,935	Labrador
Dumayat	1,388	1,182	1,090	851	Binalonan
Dumpay	5,586	5,248	5,009	4,143	Basista
Dungon	1,450	1,293	1,247	864	Sison
Dupac	2,188	2,170	1,895	1,607	Asingan
Duplac	1,098	978	925	791	Urbiztondo
Dusoc	1,224	1,177	1,066	907	Bayambang
Eguia	3,114	3,144	2,806	2,174	Dasol
Embarcadero	2,512	1,820	2,099	1,621	Mangaldan
Erfe	717	644	628	553	Santa Barbara
Esmeralda	2,599	2,483	2,474	2,302	Balungao
Esperanza	1,861	1,641	1,605	1,284	Sison
Esperanza	1,151	673	1,015	669	Umingan
Estanza	1,769	1,489	1,431	1,114	Bolinao
Estanza	4,027	4,071	3,832	3,410	Lingayen
Evangelista	1,768	1,897	1,709	1,411	Tayug
Evangelista	553	718	666	395	Umingan
Fatima	2,185	2,219	1,949	1,357	Infanta
Fianza	851	731	752	840	San Nicolas
Flores	5,340	5,403	4,768	4,163	San Manuel
Flores	2,095	1,824	1,620	1,350	Umingan
Fulgosino	704	599	562	461	Umingan
Gabon	2,531	2,557	2,388	1,948	Calasiao
Gais-Guipe	2,415	2,494	2,130	1,740	Dasol
Galarin	2,064	1,907	1,856	1,514	Urbiztondo
Gamata	1,579	1,158	1,142	1,088	San Carlos
Garrita	1,531	1,491	1,527	1,273	Bani
Gatang	1,482	1,364	1,357	1,044	Malasiqui
Gayaman	3,894	3,913	3,484	2,582	Binmaley
Gayusan	1,374	1,455	1,431	1,199	Agno
General Luna (Poblacion)	262	227	299	301	Mangatarem
Germinal (Poblacion)	3,509	3,605	3,066	2,187	Bolinao
Golden	1,370	1,314	1,214	1,040	Mapandan
Goliman	1,369	1,309	1,139	795	Malasiqui
Gomez	1,141	1,063	1,047	950	Malasiqui
Gomot	767	758	641	658	San Fabian
Gonzales	1,690	1,593	1,454	1,280	Umingan
Gonzalo	1,812	1,513	1,666	1,423	San Quintin
Goyoden	2,574	2,263	2,124	2,057	Bolinao
Gualsic	1,372	1,269	1,160	1,094	Alcala
Gueguesangen	2,510	2,489	2,376	2,063	Mangaldan
Gueguesangen	1,754	1,479	1,520	1,180	Santa Barbara
Guelew	3,602	3,099	2,909	2,347	San Carlos
Guesang	3,525	3,162	2,852	2,338	Mangaldan
Gueset	2,311	2,239	1,913	1,717	Bugallon
Gueteb	1,643	1,578	1,318	1,038	Urbiztondo
Guibel	2,119	2,143	1,912	1,648	San Jacinto
Guiguilonen	3,180	2,980	2,793	2,427	Mangaldan
Guilig	1,337	1,156	921	646	Malasiqui
Guilig	3,113	2,815	2,383	1,640	Mangaldan
Guiling	3,229	3,130	2,658	2,407	Rosales
Guiset Norte (Poblacion)	4,506	4,666	4,360	3,639	San Manuel
Guiset Sur (Poblacion)	4,192	4,307	3,201	3,498	San Manuel
Guzon	707	656	665	704	Tayug
Hacienda	3,318	2,704	2,350	1,575	Bugallon
Haway	677	662	563	459	Pozorrubio
Hermosa	1,666	1,505	1,335	1,020	Dasol
Hermoza	2,580	2,657	2,468	2,077	Bayambang
Herrero	2,428	2,241	2,444	2,855	Dagupan
Historia	468	413	465	363	Mangatarem
Ican	1,331	1,323	1,227	863	Malasiqui
Idong	816	780	643	525	Bayambang
Ilang	1,159	1,173	1,068	754	San Carlos
Ilio-Ilio (Iliw-Iliw)	1,878	2,193	1,964	1,621	Burgos
Ilogmalino	2,450	2,513	1,856	1,598	Bolinao
Imbalbalatong	2,101	2,068	1,894	1,627	Pozorrubio
Imbo	1,379	1,244	1,264	1,120	Anda
Imelda (Decrito)	1,278	1,278	1,137	826	San Jacinto
Inamotan	2,366	2,453	2,158	1,852	Manaoag
Inanlorenzana	1,031	1,013	831	773	Bayambang
Inerangan	1,815	1,849	1,739	1,518	Alaminos
Inerangan	1,463	1,255	1,084	840	San Carlos
Ingalagala	703	789	675	498	Malasiqui
Inirangan	1,517	1,296	1,382	1,096	Bayambang
Inlambo	1,499	1,450	1,364	1,159	Mangaldan
Inmalog	1,758	1,512	1,183	2,002	San Fabian
Inmalog	1,244	1,405	1,437	1,151	Sison
Inmalog Norte	1,329	1,396	–	–	San Fabian
Inmanduyan	1,602	1,609	1,391	1,121	Laoac
Inoman	2,175	1,949	1,864	1,381	Pozorrubio
Isla	2,570	2,392	2,264	1,645	San Carlos
Iton	99	75	107	175	Bayambang
Jimenez	1,666	1,715	1,527	1,230	Mapandan
Kasikis	2,614	2,428	2,487	1,644	Alcala
Ketegan	1,132	997	841	645	Bautista
Killo	1,618	1,475	1,400	1,051	Sison
Kita-Kita	1,624	1,452	1,442	1,351	Balungao
La Luna	875	835	752	629	Santo Tomas
La Paz	2,198	2,223	1,925	1,691	Umingan
La Paz	1,064	930	921	919	Urdaneta
Labayug	2,821	2,771	2,659	2,423	Sison
Labit	1,179	1,040	1,035	899	Urdaneta
Labit Proper	3,241	3,228	3,052	2,528	Urdaneta
Labit West	2,068	1,835	1,963	1,361	Urdaneta
Labney	1,922	1,811	1,989	1,603	San Jacinto
Labuan	743	742	592	558	San Quintin
Labuan	512	484	465	412	Umingan
Lagasit	3,492	3,197	2,912	2,330	San Quintin
Laguit Centro	1,543	1,517	1,532	1,164	Bugallon
Laguit Padilla	2,734	2,855	2,662	2,083	Bugallon
Lambayan	1,560	1,477	1,641	1,434	Mapandan
Lambes (Lames)	1,023	988	930	906	Bolinao
Lanas	3,065	2,723	2,475	1,881	Mangaldan
Landas	1,958	1,927	1,789	1,284	Mangaldan
Landoc	663	659	608	470	Alaminos
Langiran	1,475	1,293	1,405	1,167	Bayambang
Laoac	2,906	2,684	2,345	1,866	Alcala
Laoac	933	920	752	758	Pozorrubio
Laoag	3,089	2,853	–	–	Aguilar
Laois	2,383	2,275	1,812	1,342	Labrador
Lapalo	1,450	1,238	1,179	1,000	San Manuel
Lareg-Lareg	2,416	2,446	2,002	1,684	Malasiqui
Lasip	3,116	2,976	2,779	2,098	Calasiao
Lasip	1,569	1,613	1,710	1,322	Lingayen
Lasip	1,407	1,372	1,096	873	Malasiqui
Lasip Chico	1,370	774	937	552	Dagupan
Lasip Grande	2,622	2,705	1,318	2,007	Dagupan
Lauren	1,131	1,044	1,087	893	Umingan
Lawak	2,095	2,163	1,977	1,743	Tayug
Lawak Langka	985	880	751	534	Mangatarem
Lebueg	1,933	1,755	1,725	1,585	Laoac
Leet	3,863	3,004	2,762	2,231	Santa Barbara
Legaspi	3,231	3,063	3,036	2,751	Tayug
Lekep-Butao	2,688	2,217	2,048	1,718	San Fabian
Lelemaan	2,770	2,916	2,522	2,047	Manaoag
Lepa	2,119	2,073	1,987	1,706	Malasiqui
Libas	3,240	3,149	3,064	2,979	San Carlos
Libertad	2,351	1,771	1,761	1,393	Tayug
Libsong	1,021	997	895	663	Santa Maria
Libsong East	6,070	6,179	5,117	3,985	Lingayen
Libsong West	4,961	4,911	4,641	3,647	Lingayen
Licsi	1,499	1,416	1,168	1,237	Manaoag
Ligue	1,208	1,122	1,066	927	Bayambang
Lilimasan	2,290	1,927	1,858	1,735	San Carlos
Linmansangan	1,368	987	989	912	Alaminos
Linmansangan	3,847	3,629	3,583	2,844	Binalonan
Linmansangan	838	874	767	639	Mangatarem
Linoc	2,234	2,390	2,236	2,000	Binmaley
Lipay	3,492	3,126	2,915	2,299	Urdaneta
Lipit-Tomeeng	1,852	1,869	1,668	1,242	San Fabian
Lipit Norte	2,153	1,955	1,433	1,308	Manaoag
Lipit Sur	2,882	2,941	2,673	1,839	Manaoag
Liwa-Liwa	2,380	2,096	1,543	1,245	Bolinao
Lobong	4,023	3,475	3,369	2,564	San Jacinto
Lomboy	3,281	3,181	2,777	2,183	Binmaley
Lomboy	1,598	1,527	1,438	1,192	Urdaneta
Lomboy	1,367	1,304	1,154	902	Dagupan
Longos	2,796	2,765	2,441	1,885	Calasiao
Longos	1,113	1,060	906	616	San Carlos
Longos	2,497	2,467	1,861	4,028	San Fabian
Longos-Amangonan-Parac-Parac (Fabrica)	2,307	2,229	–	–	San Fabian
Longos Proper	1,986	1,585	–	–	San Fabian
Lopez (Poblacion)	768	752	510	414	Mangatarem
Loqueb Este	2,596	2,827	2,372	1,743	Malasiqui
Loqueb Norte	2,050	1,858	1,909	1,473	Malasiqui
Loqueb Sur	1,498	1,591	1,401	1,045	Malasiqui
Luac	1,589	1,879	1,566	1,398	Bani
Lubong	1,226	1,141	1,090	847	Umingan
Lucao	9,748	7,974	7,438	5,799	Dagupan
Lucap	5,072	5,296	4,566	3,543	Alaminos
Lucban (Poblacion)	1,000	941	945	769	San Carlos
Lucero	2,960	2,628	2,767	2,127	Bolinao
Luciente 1	4,984	4,544	3,741	2,717	Bolinao
Luciente 2	3,612	3,274	2,637	2,143	Bolinao
Lumayao	1,206	1,147	1,067	822	San Quintin
Lumbang	1,856	1,756	1,590	1,255	Calasiao
Luna	3,302	2,944	2,148	1,614	Bolinao
Luna	1,296	1,283	1,150	1,090	Mabini
Luna	1,416	1,387	1,168	1,149	Natividad
Luna Este	973	818	768	648	Umingan
Luna Weste	753	669	621	522	Umingan
Lunec	2,251	2,287	2,144	1,644	Malasiqui
Lungao	585	626	565	551	San Nicolas
Luyan (Luyan South)	2,957	2,938	2,432	2,061	Mapandan
M. Soriano	873	787	763	531	San Carlos
Maambal	1,239	1,107	948	786	Pozorrubio
Maasin	2,934	3,751	3,252	2,576	Mangaldan
Maawi	1,224	1,183	936	829	Alaminos
Mabalbalino	1,672	1,644	1,595	1,395	San Carlos
Mabanogbog	3,256	3,202	2,727	1,555	Urdaneta
Mabilao	2,776	2,424	2,218	2,855	San Fabian
Mabini	778	759	747	624	Balungao
Mabini	1,090	989	893	839	San Quintin
Mabini (Poblacion)	664	598	821	706	Mangatarem
Mabini (Poblacion)	576	508	542	549	San Carlos
Mabulitec	861	846	2,252	1,758	Malasiqui
Macabit	1,068	1,150	908	713	Bani
Macabito	3,968	3,691	3,575	2,730	Calasiao
Macaboboni	2,254	2,326	2,277	1,516	Agno
Macalang	1,964	1,690	1,611	1,293	Dasol
Macaleeng	1,629	1,590	1,464	1,265	Anda
Macalong	3,549	3,443	3,130	2,668	Asingan
Macalong	1,400	1,334	1,232	1,003	Urdaneta
Macandocandong	987	910	962	880	Anda
Macarang	1,365	1,257	1,217	895	Mangatarem
Macatiw	893	828	783	700	Alaminos
Macaycayawan	650	527	494	430	Sual
Macayo	1,714	1,834	1,665	1,438	Alcala
Macayocayo	1,389	1,230	1,295	970	Bayambang
Macayug	2,287	2,076	1,643	1,244	Mangaldan
Macayug	2,842	2,606	2,250	1,632	San Jacinto
Magallanes	2,695	2,632	2,301	1,919	Tayug
Magalong	891	938	763	708	Mabini
Magsaysay	1,291	1,128	1,008	974	Agno
Magsaysay	3,215	2,348	2,572	2,079	Alaminos
Magsaysay	1,476	1,356	1,331	1,154	Bayambang
Magsaysay	669	631	644	578	Dasol
Magsaysay	1,465	1,410	1,228	929	Labrador
Magsaysay (Capay)	904	653	543	452	San Jacinto
Magtaking	5,867	5,854	5,502	5,140	Bugallon
Magtaking	2,782	2,817	2,450	2,068	San Carlos
Maigpa	1,384	1,211	1,270	1,007	Bayambang
Mal-ong	2,734	2,325	2,143	1,509	Anda
Malabago	4,116	3,827	3,348	2,667	Calasiao
Malabago	4,679	4,328	3,627	2,624	Mangaldan
Malabobo	1,619	1,667	1,430	1,062	Mangatarem
Malaca	1,283	1,208	1,178	1,061	Urbiztondo
Malacañang	3,865	3,237	3,088	2,295	San Carlos
Malacapas	715	855	989	823	Dasol
Malanay	2,316	2,268	2,076	1,620	Santa Barbara
Malasin	1,853	1,809	1,734	1,346	Pozorrubio
Malawa	1,761	1,810	1,945	1,599	Lingayen
Malayo	1,681	1,494	1,270	937	Urbiztondo
Malibong	255	234	215	181	Mangatarem
Malibong	2,665	2,573	2,140	1,867	Urbiztondo
Malico	214	220	349	472	San Nicolas
Malilion	1,063	1,037	1,006	888	San Nicolas
Malimpec	1,146	937	931	734	Bayambang
Malimpec	2,308	2,150	2,085	1,523	Malasiqui
Malimpec East	1,382	1,228	1,224	924	Basista
Malimpin	1,399	1,467	1,370	1,070	Dasol
Malimpuec	3,446	3,088	3,101	2,883	Lingayen
Malindong	3,274	3,367	3,182	2,758	Binmaley
Malioer	2,224	2,285	1,984	1,629	Bayambang
Maliwara	856	682	649	610	San Carlos
Malokiat	1,200	1,102	1,137	900	Pozorrubio
Malued	9,406	9,798	8,238	7,143	Dagupan
Malunec	351	310	282	210	Mangatarem
Mamalingling	1,456	1,280	1,053	825	Dagupan
Mamarlao	2,123	2,273	2,115	1,572	San Carlos
Managos	1,392	1,328	1,066	878	Bayambang
Manambong Norte	814	703	645	506	Bayambang
Manambong Parte	1,528	1,502	1,217	947	Bayambang
Manambong Sur	2,053	1,995	1,644	1,382	Bayambang
Manaol	1,450	1,338	1,277	1,088	Pozorrubio
Manat	1,580	1,490	1,463	1,228	Binmaley
Mancup	3,180	3,268	2,787	2,480	Calasiao
Mangayao	1,056	903	933	859	Bayambang
Mangcasuy	1,431	1,380	1,275	1,175	Binalonan
Manggan-Dampay	1,321	1,200	1,259	906	Malasiqui
Mangin	3,700	3,611	2,877	2,045	Dagupan
Maniboc	7,397	7,260	6,687	4,947	Lingayen
Maningding	3,990	4,240	4,023	3,138	Santa Barbara
Manlocboc	1,176	1,018	–	–	Aguilar
Mantacdang	1,090	1,286	1,007	759	San Quintin
Mantacdang	623	624	568	451	Umingan
Manzon	1,853	1,768	1,681	1,313	San Carlos
Mapolopolo	2,222	1,846	2,053	1,699	Basista
Maraboc	1,163	1,065	962	768	Laoac
Maravilla-Arellano Extension (Poblacion)	1,136	1,109	1,015	730	Mangatarem
Maravilla (Poblacion)	768	527	683	660	Mangatarem
Marcelo H. del Pilar	1,664	1,357	1,543	1,312	Bayambang
Maronong	2,904	3,074	2,744	2,041	Santa Barbara
Maseil-seil	1,753	1,837	1,531	1,218	Umingan
Masidem	1,063	1,153	944	932	Bani
Matagdem	3,033	2,987	2,659	2,022	San Carlos
Matalava	2,796	2,782	2,441	2,139	Lingayen
Maticmatic	4,235	4,074	3,287	1,412	Santa Barbara
Matolong	1,508	1,457	1,260	1,170	Manaoag
Mauban	1,042	1,020	992	793	Balungao
Maya	1,142	1,148	1,117	853	Infanta
Mayombo	7,937	6,566	6,070	7,269	Dagupan
Mermer	1,347	1,170	1,166	808	Manaoag
Mestizo Norte	1,505	1,322	1,236	1,067	San Carlos
Minien East	2,863	2,579	2,072	1,646	Santa Barbara
Minien West	4,557	4,604	3,582	940	Santa Barbara
Mona	1,849	1,544	1,456	1,162	Alaminos
Moreno	1,587	1,657	1,516	1,425	Binalonan
Muelang	448	364	327	171	Mangatarem
Nagkaysa	963	955	1,062	1,090	San Nicolas
Nagpalangan	1,474	1,866	1,708	1,333	Binmaley
Nagsaag	2,325	2,413	1,986	1,879	San Manuel
Nagsaing	5,370	5,176	4,528	4,036	Calasiao
Naguelguel	2,856	2,726	2,891	2,661	Lingayen
Naguilayan	4,300	3,715	3,495	2,680	Binmaley
Naguilayan	1,465	1,395	1,154	837	San Carlos
Naguilayan East	493	452	479	419	Mangatarem
Naguilayan West	551	542	457	378	Mangatarem
Nalneran	1,270	1,167	1,085	897	Basista
Nalsian	5,365	6,005	4,683	3,609	Calasiao
Nalsian	2,348	2,366	2,032	1,798	Manaoag
Nalsian Norte	1,719	1,859	1,676	1,386	Bayambang
Nalsian Norte	1,228	1,308	2,771	2,127	Malasiqui
Nalsian Sur	1,489	1,286	1,245	1,009	Bayambang
Nalsian Sur	2,953	3,060	993	829	Malasiqui
Nama	2,812	2,490	2,179	1,701	Pozorrubio
Namagbagan	1,652	1,621	1,588	1,312	Anda
Namagbagan	1,869	1,942	1,856	1,700	Santa Maria
Namatucan	1,173	1,172	1,189	946	Agno
Namolan	2,268	2,324	2,140	1,800	Lingayen
Nampalcan	1,111	912	848	644	Umingan
Nanbagatan	1,323	1,256	1,163	915	Laoac
Nancalabasaan	2,340	2,219	1,979	1,534	Umingan
Nancalobasaan	2,956	2,606	2,593	2,176	Urdaneta
Nancamaliran East	4,753	4,108	4,453	3,498	Urdaneta
Nancamaliran West	5,291	4,405	4,456	3,438	Urdaneta
Nancapian	1,126	1,126	1,100	817	Malasiqui
Nancasalan	1,138	1,296	1,174	1,020	Mangatarem
Nancayasan	6,893	7,277	6,917	5,240	Urdaneta
Nandacan	1,251	1,341	1,179	1,019	Bautista
Nangalisan	1,031	1,236	940	851	Infanta
Nangapugan	1,755	1,691	1,504	1,086	San Quintin
Nansangaan	586	663	567	508	Malasiqui
Nantangalan	1,504	1,591	1,318	1,190	Pozorrubio
Narra	3,245	3,323	2,970	2,833	San Manuel
Navaluan	3,391	2,678	2,630	1,863	Mangaldan
Navatat	2,666	2,779	2,307	1,763	Basista
Nayom	1,418	1,664	1,368	1,179	Infanta
Nibaliw	1,111	1,069	917	854	Mabini
Nibaliw	2,717	2,561	2,123	1,563	Mangaldan
Nibaliw Central	919	819	676	435	San Fabian
Nibaliw East	2,305	2,163	1,945	1,461	San Fabian
Nibaliw Magliba	1,879	2,170	2,347	2,113	San Fabian
Nibaliw Narvarte (Nibaliw West Compound)	2,184	2,069	–	–	San Fabian
Nibaliw Norte	2,050	1,539	1,595	1,244	Bautista
Nibaliw Sur	1,036	992	905	786	Bautista
Nibaliw Vidal (Nibaliw West Proper)	3,219	3,000	1,586	1,733	San Fabian
Nilentap	1,309	1,232	1,160	954	San Carlos
Nilombot	4,075	4,837	3,574	2,765	Mapandan
Nilombot	2,090	1,932	1,966	1,319	Santa Barbara
Nining	451	401	390	309	San Nicolas
Niñoy	3,922	3,252	3,186	2,384	Aguilar
Niog-Cabison-Bulaney	1,009	968	755	508	Mangatarem
Obong	2,146	1,765	1,775	1,481	Basista
Olea	2,231	2,423	869	638	Malasiqui
Olegario-Caoile (Poblacion)	494	437	448	383	Mangatarem
Olo Cacamposan	1,492	1,439	1,384	1,181	Mangatarem
Olo Cafabrosan	1,034	1,047	970	722	Mangatarem
Olo Cagarlitan	985	1,006	855	623	Mangatarem
Oltama	1,331	1,223	1,099	885	Urdaneta
Oraan East	1,080	940	786	737	Manaoag
Oraan West	1,480	1,432	1,244	1,089	Manaoag
Osiem	3,178	2,847	2,553	2,058	Mangaldan
Osmeña	1,522	1,489	1,525	1,232	Dasol
Osmeña (Poblacion)	952	840	822	670	Mangatarem
Osmeña Sr.	1,708	1,589	1,210	1,138	Basista
Pacalat	924	846	716	525	Mangatarem
Pacuan	642	585	529	395	Malasiqui
Padilla-Gomez	2,062	1,772	1,942	1,674	San Carlos
Pagal	3,856	3,393	3,320	2,748	San Carlos
Paitan	1,920	1,884	1,737	1,474	Santa Maria
Paitan-Panoypoy	1,498	1,302	1,282	915	San Carlos
Paitan East	1,085	1,078	926	677	Sual
Paitan West	1,902	1,867	1,689	1,478	Sual
Palacpalac	2,841	2,810	2,735	2,316	Pozorrubio
Palakipak	1,206	1,150	927	782	Rosales
Palaming	2,406	2,245	2,160	1,707	San Carlos
Palamis	4,089	3,110	3,808	3,233	Alaminos
Palapad	1,834	1,576	1,578	1,429	San Fabian
Palapar Norte	1,211	991	992	792	Malasiqui
Palapar Sur	921	865	825	715	Malasiqui
Palaris	2,010	2,077	1,906	1,645	Asingan
Palaris (Poblacion)	565	476	526	478	San Carlos
Paldit	3,630	3,426	3,390	2,357	Sison
Palguyod	2,978	2,895	2,989	2,263	Pozorrubio
Palina East	4,497	4,527	4,097	3,337	Urdaneta
Palina West	2,788	2,555	2,190	1,653	Urdaneta
Palisoc	1,562	1,410	1,260	983	Bautista
Pallas	1,918	1,723	1,668	1,385	Binmaley
Palma	2,008	2,105	1,935	1,607	Basista
Palong	2,189	2,169	1,944	1,397	Malasiqui
Palospos	1,216	1,162	1,176	872	San Carlos
Palua	1,932	1,575	1,345	1,013	Mangaldan
Pamaranum	625	613	560	458	Malasiqui
Pampano	2,162	2,022	1,836	1,327	Mangatarem
Panacol	1,415	1,424	–	–	Aguilar
Panaga	1,377	1,265	1,094	993	Laoac
Pandan	1,116	1,044	935	880	Alaminos
Pangalangan	2,828	2,450	2,316	1,777	San Carlos
Pangangaan	800	609	784	593	Umingan
Panganiban	2,760	2,391	2,496	2,250	Tayug
Pangaoan	1,401	1,263	1,087	944	Rosales
Pangapisan	2,294	2,003	2,408	2,004	Alaminos
Pangapisan North	7,539	6,534	4,695	3,862	Lingayen
Pangapisan Sur	1,490	1,511	1,535	1,229	Lingayen
Pangascasan	1,809	1,529	1,638	1,516	Bugallon
Pangascasan	2,743	2,692	2,446	1,274	Sual
Pangdel	1,888	1,919	1,625	1,307	Bayambang
Pangoloan	1,388	1,208	1,181	1,004	San Carlos
Pangpang	2,826	2,638	2,398	1,884	San Carlos
Pantal	2,205	1,527	1,401	1,124	Bugallon
Pantal	3,203	3,006	2,453	1,776	Manaoag
Pantal	17,174	16,835	14,762	14,890	Dagupan
Pantol	1,023	1,006	826	644	Bayambang
Pao	3,327	3,118	2,903	2,755	Manaoag
Papagueyan	1,490	1,352	1,240	947	Binmaley
Papallasen	1,472	1,461	1,168	959	Burgos
Papallasen	1,087	1,108	987	977	Umingan
Paragos	467	437	323	921	Bayambang
Parayao	1,995	2,107	2,140	1,608	Binmaley
Parayao	760	506	853	469	San Carlos
Parian	398	331	264	149	Manaoag
Parian	1,064	1,051	997	703	Mangatarem
Pasibi East	2,443	2,217	1,987	1,656	Urbiztondo
Pasibi West	1,177	1,013	975	775	Urbiztondo
Pasileng Norte	702	642	659	552	Binalonan
Pasileng Sur	1,298	1,377	1,295	1,014	Binalonan
Pasima	2,586	2,616	2,343	1,714	Malasiqui
Patacbo	1,573	1,562	1,325	899	Basista
Pataquid	962	880	790	602	Santa Maria
Patar	952	931	956	889	Agno
Patar	1,335	1,044	997	808	Bolinao
Patar	919	856	785	656	Mabini
Patayac	2,651	2,431	2,310	1,731	Santa Barbara
Paul	433	415	446	412	Mangatarem
Payapa	1,187	1,020	891	739	San Carlos
Payar	1,389	1,252	1,306	1,107	Malasiqui
Payar	1,619	1,468	1,398	1,043	San Carlos
Payas	3,388	3,139	2,876	2,201	Santa Barbara
Peania Pedania (Bedania)	1,144	1,042	1,010	716	Mangatarem
Pemienta	1,949	1,771	1,600	1,031	Umingan
Perez Boulevard (Poblacion)	717	811	828	652	San Carlos
Petal	1,388	1,273	1,239	831	Dasol
Pias	4,297	2,813	3,463	2,755	Mapandan
Piaz (Plaza)	4,848	4,544	4,200	3,797	Urdaneta
Pilar	2,365	2,415	2,083	1,869	Bolinao
Pilar	1,722	1,745	1,607	1,332	Santa Maria
Pindangan	1,416	1,301	1,279	1,058	Sison
Pindangan Centro	1,657	1,567	1,544	663	Alcala
Pindangan East	1,661	1,538	1,385	1,104	Alcala
Pindangan West	1,220	1,073	865	1,325	Alcala
Pinmaludpod	6,743	6,110	5,567	4,453	Urdaneta
Pinmilapil	1,614	1,538	1,481	1,151	Sison
Pisuac	2,885	2,537	2,376	1,894	Urbiztondo
Pita	892	854	566	1,067	Infanta
PNR Station Site	985	878	794	643	San Carlos
Poblacion	3,387	3,316	3,267	2,869	Aguilar
Poblacion	10,065	10,095	9,704	8,070	Alaminos
Poblacion	3,163	2,991	2,924	2,400	Anda
Poblacion	1,941	2,015	1,746	1,649	Balungao
Poblacion	4,670	3,697	4,815	4,253	Bani
Poblacion	2,709	2,585	2,573	2,063	Basista
Poblacion	7,565	7,634	7,536	7,621	Binalonan
Poblacion	4,533	4,558	4,327	3,555	Binmaley
Poblacion	9,041	9,259	8,699	7,567	Bugallon
Poblacion	2,524	3,127	2,994	2,548	Burgos
Poblacion	3,337	3,472	3,601	2,555	Dasol
Poblacion	3,080	3,071	2,925	2,490	Infanta
Poblacion	1,828	1,869	1,950	1,743	Labrador
Poblacion	12,642	12,612	11,259	12,524	Lingayen
Poblacion	3,038	2,659	2,645	2,295	Mabini
Poblacion	7,843	7,904	7,576	7,921	Malasiqui
Poblacion	5,188	5,618	5,746	5,452	Manaoag
Poblacion	4,992	4,509	4,586	5,425	Mangaldan
Poblacion	3,360	3,388	3,416	3,173	Mapandan
Poblacion	3,737	3,831	3,486	3,127	San Fabian
Poblacion	6,640	6,364	4,895	3,652	Sual
Poblacion	4,906	4,424	4,186	3,647	Urbiztondo
Poblacion	7,247	8,783	8,454	10,180	Urdaneta
Poblacion (Laoac)	1,964	1,711	1,684	1,543	Laoac
Poblacion Central	1,478	1,595	1,548	1,460	Sison
Poblacion East	1,390	1,507	1,372	1,108	Agno
Poblacion East	1,438	1,361	1,521	1,271	Alcala
Poblacion East	2,989	3,072	2,755	2,184	Asingan
Poblacion East	1,978	1,472	1,844	1,636	Bautista
Poblacion East	1,636	1,358	1,418	1,361	Calasiao
Poblacion East	1,828	1,935	1,767	1,563	Natividad
Poblacion East	2,607	2,737	2,580	2,507	San Nicolas
Poblacion East	1,005	1,100	1,099	1,071	Santa Maria
Poblacion East	1,050	1,037	891	690	Santo Tomas
Poblacion East	1,543	1,715	1,758	1,935	Umingan
Poblacion I	2,478	2,323	2,199	2,052	Pozorrubio
Poblacion II	1,305	1,252	1,278	1,362	Pozorrubio
Poblacion III	1,612	1,554	1,661	1,339	Pozorrubio
Poblacion IV	1,215	1,446	1,239	1,001	Pozorrubio
Poblacion Norte	1,782	1,634	1,621	1,360	Santa Barbara
Poblacion Norte	1,987	1,849	1,767	1,542	Sison
Poblacion Oeste	4,523	4,231	3,592	4,297	Dagupan
Poblacion Sur	1,244	1,167	1,127	852	Bayambang
Poblacion Sur	1,883	1,772	1,650	1,490	Santa Barbara
Poblacion Sur	1,118	1,039	980	917	Sison
Poblacion West	1,179	1,138	1,069	1,007	Agno
Poblacion West	1,643	1,768	1,712	1,632	Alcala
Poblacion West	1,761	1,598	1,635	1,444	Asingan
Poblacion West	995	1,041	1,022	802	Bautista
Poblacion West	958	706	1,044	952	Calasiao
Poblacion West	1,522	1,511	1,439	1,439	Natividad
Poblacion West	584	638	671	687	San Nicolas
Poblacion West	1,267	1,223	1,236	1,070	Santa Maria
Poblacion West	553	502	449	367	Santo Tomas
Poblacion West	2,546	2,488	2,676	2,232	Umingan
Poblacion Zone I	605	603	594	662	San Quintin
Poblacion Zone II	510	457	447	534	San Quintin
Poblacion Zone III	431	379	476	481	San Quintin
Pocalpocal	2,081	1,976	1,557	1,002	Alaminos
Pogo	2,093	1,956	1,581	1,058	Alaminos
Pogo	1,849	1,589	1,584	915	Bautista
Pogo	1,380	1,422	1,138	975	Mangaldan
Pogo Chico	4,603	4,852	4,773	5,698	Dagupan
Pogo Grande	2,112	2,243	1,987	1,917	Dagupan
Pogomboa	1,820	1,648	1,656	2,960	Aguilar
Pogon-Aniat	244	227	231	153	Mangatarem
Pogon-Lomboy (Poblacion)	679	492	383	285	Mangatarem
Pogonsili	2,465	2,291	2,049	1,712	Aguilar
Pogoruac	1,943	2,341	2,021	1,757	Burgos
Polo	2,288	2,298	2,168	1,991	Alaminos
Polo	1,359	1,191	1,173	895	San Carlos
Polong	2,680	2,718	2,622	2,206	Bugallon
Polong Norte	1,432	1,313	1,403	1,053	Malasiqui
Polong Sur	1,560	1,599	1,431	1,323	Malasiqui
Ponglo-Baleg	446	478	454	340	Mangatarem
Ponglo Muelag	478	439	468	317	Mangatarem
Poponto	1,662	1,582	1,626	1,255	Bautista
Portic	2,147	1,990	1,882	1,238	Bugallon
Potiocan	1,589	1,735	1,377	936	Malasiqui
Potol	707	756	628	492	Infanta
Pototan	1,170	998	1,190	1,086	Binmaley
Prado	1,051	989	1,033	804	Umingan
Primicias	1,802	1,748	1,530	1,057	Bautista
Primicias	1,818	1,819	1,683	1,411	Mapandan
Primicias (Ventinilla West)	1,825	1,663	2,302	1,215	Santa Barbara
Puelay	7,159	6,539	6,342	5,303	Urdaneta
Pugaro	2,259	2,069	1,800	1,682	Balungao
Pugaro	4,322	4,365	3,355	2,435	Manaoag
Pugaro Suit	4,757	4,063	3,454	2,929	Dagupan
Pugo	1,440	1,211	1,120	874	Bayambang
Pugot	302	304	264	216	Santa Maria
Quesban	2,883	2,595	2,548	2,005	Calasiao
Quetegan (Pogon-Baleg)	1,760	1,682	1,681	1,375	Mangatarem
Quezon (Poblacion)	190	218	265	284	Mangatarem
Quezon Boulevard (Poblacion)	1,597	1,405	1,410	1,043	San Carlos
Quibaol	2,348	2,432	1,927	1,626	Lingayen
Quibuar	1,502	1,287	1,512	1,325	Alaminos
Quinaoayanan	3,026	2,886	2,425	2,458	Bani
Quintong	3,257	3,109	2,926	2,254	San Carlos
Rabago	2,136	2,075	1,738	1,519	Rosales
Rabon	2,055	1,924	1,465	1,515	San Fabian
Rajal	1,613	1,532	1,385	1,311	Balungao
Ranao	2,142	2,384	1,954	1,659	Bani
Ranom Iloco	1,611	1,676	1,482	1,210	Bani
Real	2,608	2,220	2,087	1,906	Urbiztondo
Resurreccion	674	659	742	517	Umingan
Reynado	1,091	1,034	906	741	Bayambang
Ricos	932	843	802	564	Umingan
Rizal	788	611	638	517	Natividad
Rizal	1,273	1,219	1,114	889	Rosales
Rizal (Poblacion)	2,494	2,427	2,249	1,917	San Carlos
Rosario	2,014	1,816	1,707	1,357	Lingayen
Rosario	4,877	4,330	4,485	3,549	Pozorrubio
Roxas	1,532	1,614	1,527	1,248	Anda
Roxas Boulevard (Poblacion)	1,255	1,005	1,091	1,228	San Carlos
Sabangan	1,863	1,659	1,515	1,156	Alaminos
Sabangan	779	666	801	614	Binmaley
Sabangan	1,323	1,609	1,578	1,302	Lingayen
Sablig	2,349	2,285	2,297	2,036	Anda
Sagud-Bahley	3,816	3,794	3,525	2,804	San Fabian
Sagunto	1,916	2,019	1,926	1,334	Sison
Salaan	2,438	2,207	2,040	1,646	Mangaldan
Salapingao	1,156	788	757	681	Binmaley
Salapingao	2,890	2,466	2,308	1,847	Dagupan
Salasa	2,843	2,892	2,435	1,837	Bugallon
Salavante	708	673	597	455	Mangatarem
Salavante	855	761	741	643	Urbiztondo
Salay	4,958	4,487	3,833	2,868	Mangaldan
Saleng	658	670	603	513	Tayug
Salinap	2,541	2,511	2,326	2,004	San Carlos
Salingcob	806	717	756	695	San Nicolas
Salisay	2,134	2,191	1,689	1,645	Dagupan
Salomague Norte	1,348	1,287	1,341	1,069	Bugallon
Salomague Sur	2,902	2,666	2,580	2,056	Bugallon
Salpad	455	460	442	435	San Nicolas
Salud	2,295	2,144	2,017	1,652	Bolinao
Salud	1,594	1,550	1,417	1,225	Natividad
Salvacion	1,082	975	919	723	Rosales
Salvacion	1,403	1,357	1,171	1,060	Santo Tomas
Samang Norte	1,044	1,030	879	669	Bolinao
Samang Sur	1,049	1,114	841	686	Bolinao
Samat	1,824	1,783	1,798	1,678	Bugallon
Samon	2,227	2,174	1,954	1,559	Santa Maria
Sampaloc	2,710	2,537	2,041	1,481	Bolinao
San Agustin	1,552	1,446	1,332	1,072	Santo Tomas
San Alejandro	2,015	1,995	1,977	1,758	Santa Maria
San Andres	899	782	797	731	Balungao
San Andres	715	670	669	591	Umingan
San Angel	849	805	672	582	Rosales
San Antonio	1,136	1,048	1,066	893	Rosales
San Antonio	3,984	3,696	3,382	2,607	Santo Tomas
San Antonio-Arzadon	2,478	2,493	1,914	1,608	San Manuel
San Antonio (Ramon Magsaysay)	1,065	999	778	668	Alaminos
San Aurelio 1st	1,721	1,636	1,547	1,158	Balungao
San Aurelio 2nd	1,275	1,226	1,073	868	Balungao
San Aurelio 3rd	649	624	658	606	Balungao
San Bartolome	1,342	1,323	1,138	954	Rosales
San Blas	3,078	3,052	2,778	2,307	Urdaneta
San Bonifacio	3,236	3,310	3,138	2,472	San Manuel
San Eugenio	1,577	1,525	1,486	1,130	Natividad
San Felipe Central	2,114	2,074	1,935	1,806	Binalonan
San Felipe East	2,488	2,656	2,336	1,760	San Nicolas
San Felipe Sur	1,961	1,843	1,582	1,425	Binalonan
San Felipe West	942	907	821	762	San Nicolas
San Francisco	1,465	1,180	1,152	836	Bugallon
San Gabriel 1st	1,270	1,190	1,154	820	Bayambang
San Gabriel 2nd	1,990	1,838	1,614	1,603	Bayambang
San Gonzalo	1,029	892	926	864	Labrador
San Guillermo (Poblacion West)	1,017	1,002	852	851	San Jacinto
San Isidro	1,309	1,290	1,156	986	Rosales
San Isidro (Sta. Cruzan)	777	790	727	634	San Nicolas
San Isidro Norte	2,447	2,410	2,155	1,583	Binmaley
San Isidro Sur	2,487	2,108	2,077	1,680	Binmaley
San Joaquin	1,475	1,482	1,356	1,228	Balungao
San Jose	2,472	2,175	2,053	2,886	Aguilar
San Jose	1,771	1,686	1,484	1,279	Alaminos
San Jose	2,141	1,847	1,732	1,414	Anda
San Jose	1,717	1,897	1,824	1,534	Bani
San Jose	1,274	1,208	1,136	916	Labrador
San Jose	2,792	2,739	2,280	1,795	San Jacinto
San Jose	1,072	963	979	894	San Nicolas
San Jose	1,350	1,303	1,112	1,027	Santo Tomas
San Jose	5,427	5,431	4,629	3,669	Urdaneta
San Juan	1,310	1,247	1,218	1,169	Agno
San Juan	1,932	1,954	1,704	1,648	Alcala
San Juan	2,692	2,389	2,236	1,680	San Carlos
San Juan	1,659	1,049	1,222	921	San Jacinto
San Juan	2,779	2,512	2,367	2,086	San Manuel
San Juan	1,110	1,026	948	893	Umingan
San Julian	953	840	872	776	Balungao
San Julian	1,353	1,364	1,236	1,089	Malasiqui
San Leon	1,680	1,630	1,637	1,631	Balungao
San Leon	1,814	1,495	1,696	1,463	Umingan
San Luis	1,044	993	933	831	Rosales
San Macario Norte	1,032	959	828	629	Natividad
San Macario Sur	1,049	916	873	618	Natividad
San Marcelino	1,336	1,289	1,249	1,088	Balungao
San Marcos	928	895	807	759	Santo Tomas
San Mariano	1,021	1,022	854	682	Santa Maria
San Maximo	1,395	1,387	1,148	832	Natividad
San Miguel	627	648	635	612	Balungao
San Miguel	3,384	3,439	3,464	3,073	Bani
San Miguel	1,024	1,025	917	737	Burgos
San Miguel	7,363	6,443	5,608	4,161	Calasiao
San Miguel	2,031	2,169	1,834	1,460	Natividad
San Nicolas	1,112	987	1,018	985	Alcala
San Nicolas	1,868	2,080	1,973	1,878	Urdaneta
San Pablo	1,560	1,660	1,656	1,389	Binalonan
San Pablo	1,327	1,216	1,161	1,020	Santa Maria
San Pablo	466	402	386	328	Umingan
San Pascual	1,190	1,280	1,205	933	Burgos
San Patricio	915	850	728	655	Santa Maria
San Pedro	1,057	965	829	697	Mabini
San Pedro	1,413	1,215	1,182	971	San Quintin
San Pedro-Taloy	2,383	2,429	2,220	1,949	San Carlos
San Pedro Apartado	3,484	3,395	3,082	2,584	Alcala
San Pedro East	1,623	1,816	1,520	1,481	Rosales
San Pedro III	3,063	2,866	2,641	2,258	Alcala
San Pedro West	2,277	1,631	1,668	1,496	Rosales
San Rafael Centro	762	762	630	486	San Nicolas
San Rafael East	732	770	616	569	San Nicolas
San Rafael West	1,472	1,305	1,136	869	San Nicolas
San Ramon	1,535	1,364	1,142	816	Manaoag
San Raymundo	1,272	1,166	1,087	918	Balungao
San Roque	2,059	3,592	1,706	1,268	Alaminos
San Roque	762	727	624	616	Bolinao
San Roque	1,603	1,711	1,493	1,175	San Jacinto
San Roque	4,737	4,587	4,261	2,906	San Manuel
San Roque	2,705	2,706	2,367	2,101	San Nicolas
San Simon	1,228	1,159	1,131	1,078	Bani
San Vicente	3,915	3,864	3,556	2,520	Alaminos
San Vicente	3,957	3,581	2,908	2,601	Alcala
San Vicente	1,261	1,217	1,173	1,125	Bani
San Vicente	2,564	2,757	2,282	1,752	Bayambang
San Vicente	841	892	776	622	Burgos
San Vicente	1,418	1,316	1,272	1,064	Calasiao
San Vicente	851	914	913	759	Dasol
San Vicente	423	442	329	243	Rosales
San Vicente	3,579	3,490	3,167	2,267	San Jacinto
San Vicente	3,369	3,366	3,091	2,803	San Manuel
San Vicente	3,384	3,344	2,897	2,504	Santa Maria
San Vicente	849	788	722	572	Umingan
San Vicente	9,854	9,896	9,446	7,233	Urdaneta
San Vicente Este	1,306	1,242	1,312	1,102	Asingan
San Vicente Weste	2,247	2,259	1,915	1,639	Asingan
Sanchez	1,361	1,300	1,279	1,157	Asingan
Sangcagulis	1,627	1,378	1,244	921	Bayambang
Sanlibo	2,839	2,177	2,414	1,990	Bayambang
Santa Catalina	2,697	2,782	2,523	2,525	Binalonan
Santa Cruz	458	475	425	392	San Jacinto
Santa Cruz	962	899	780	751	Santa Maria
Santa Ines	1,682	1,751	1,481	1,344	Manaoag
Santa Lucia	2,420	2,124	1,686	1,296	Urdaneta
Santa Maria	1,326	1,265	1,084	888	Alaminos
Santa Maria	2,601	2,345	2,405	1,938	San Jacinto
Santa Maria	1,442	1,268	1,130	841	Umingan
Santa Maria (Luyan North)	1,175	1,249	1,037	911	Mapandan
Santa Maria East	1,606	1,478	1,523	1,145	San Nicolas
Santa Maria Norte	2,584	2,406	2,274	2,113	Binalonan
Santa Maria West	1,217	1,190	1,249	959	San Nicolas
Santa Rosa	3,212	2,726	2,640	1,965	Binmaley
Santa Rosa	1,679	1,992	1,627	1,316	Santa Maria
Santa Rosa	698	724	618	383	Umingan
Santiago	1,368	1,290	1,310	1,142	Binalonan
Santo Domingo	5,381	5,433	4,518	2,411	San Manuel
Santo Domingo	1,458	1,433	1,346	1,094	Santo Tomas
Santo Domingo	776	712	635	523	Sual
Santo Domingo	1,408	1,512	1,270	1,121	Tayug
Santo Domingo	2,941	2,707	2,028	1,905	Urdaneta
Santo Niño	1,544	1,486	1,565	1,548	Binalonan
Santo Niño	1,253	1,202	1,062	948	Santo Tomas
Santo Tomas	2,450	2,424	2,304	1,707	San Jacinto
Santo Tomas	521	522	524	488	San Nicolas
Sapa Grande	1,158	1,290	1,131	1,051	Burgos
Sapa Pequeña	929	911	818	707	Burgos
Sapang	1,661	1,629	1,532	1,357	Bayambang
Sapang	2,305	2,250	1,729	1,232	Manaoag
Sapang	739	648	607	439	Mangatarem
Sapang	2,215	2,125	1,923	1,634	Santa Barbara
Sapinit	1,205	1,021	1,003	680	San Carlos
Sawat	2,767	2,396	2,349	1,842	Urbiztondo
Seselangen	1,689	1,735	1,572	1,341	Sual
Siapar	1,504	1,131	1,058	777	Anda
Siblot	1,236	1,152	971	795	San Nicolas
Silag	763	727	587	485	Natividad
Sinabaan	559	515	494	454	Bautista
Sinabaan	905	1,001	928	777	Umingan
Sioasio East	946	837	797	743	Sual
Sioasio West	599	678	591	545	Sual
Sobol	2,667	2,153	2,238	1,896	Asingan
Sobol	2,323	2,250	1,867	1,540	San Fabian
Sobol	597	586	444	357	San Nicolas
Songkoy	2,607	2,477	2,147	1,693	Calasiao
Sonquil	2,697	2,307	2,172	1,866	Santa Barbara
Sonson Ongkit	835	743	677	566	Mangatarem
Station District	3,019	2,737	2,486	1,944	Rosales
Suaco	511	440	419	283	Mangatarem
Sugcong	1,838	1,690	1,509	1,398	Pozorrubio
Sugcong	926	853	729	700	Urdaneta
Sumabnit	4,147	4,388	3,975	3,144	Binalonan
Supo	1,166	1,132	957	639	San Carlos
Tabo-Sili	1,291	1,283	974	808	Malasiqui
Tabuyoc	1,169	1,338	1,180	1,068	Binalonan
Tagac	835	820	709	549	Mangatarem
Tagudin	3,241	3,419	2,824	2,035	Mabini
Takipan	649	595	594	443	Mangatarem
Talang	1,558	1,531	1,459	1,200	San Carlos
Talibaew	4,533	4,385	3,817	3,163	Calasiao
Talogtog	1,037	1,164	1,118	1,099	Laoac
Talogtog	509	410	299	282	Lingayen
Talogtog	2,303	2,157	2,160	1,846	Mangaldan
Talogtog	584	560	550	404	Mangatarem
Talogtog	1,995	2,015	1,763	1,433	Pozorrubio
Talospatang	2,034	2,225	2,829	2,348	Malasiqui
Taloy	2,863	3,070	2,176	1,785	Malasiqui
Taloyan	2,498	2,501	1,283	1,056	Malasiqui
Tamaro	1,705	1,675	1,576	1,133	Bayambang
Tamayo	2,970	2,446	3,010	2,477	San Carlos
Tambac	2,289	2,127	2,087	1,694	Bayambang
Tambac	765	759	564	485	Dasol
Tambac	1,089	1,400	2,712	2,222	Malasiqui
Tambac	2,328	2,064	1,880	1,471	Dagupan
Tambacan	1,286	1,425	1,421	946	Burgos
Tambobong	1,634	1,583	1,279	1,156	Dasol
Tampac	1,887	1,878	1,671	1,650	Aguilar
Tampog	1,201	1,147	981	452	Bayambang
Tanaytanay	1,481	1,405	1,254	920	Alaminos
Tandang Sora	557	581	482	526	San Carlos
Tandoc	3,452	3,169	2,953	2,324	San Carlos
Tangcarang	2,216	2,055	1,752	1,195	Alaminos
Tanggal Sawang	350	328	311	276	Umingan
Tanolong	2,933	2,911	2,571	2,107	Bayambang
Tapuac	4,391	4,166	4,341	3,884	Dagupan
Tara	1,683	2,149	1,629	1,135	Bolinao
Tara-Tara	1,205	1,105	1,253	1,021	Sison
Tarece	4,310	3,553	3,184	2,840	San Carlos
Tarectec	1,456	1,151	1,084	916	San Carlos
Tatarao	1,262	1,175	1,012	867	Bayambang
Tawintawin	1,509	1,323	1,387	1,098	Alaminos
Tayambani	1,310	1,326	1,255	910	San Carlos
Tebag	2,571	2,237	1,833	1,478	Mangaldan
Tebag	1,172	1,048	964	938	San Carlos
Tebag East	603	623	606	481	Santa Barbara
Tebag West	2,345	2,381	1,965	1,263	Santa Barbara
Tebeng	2,744	2,636	2,117	1,584	Dagupan
Tebuel	1,975	1,884	1,857	1,531	Manaoag
Telbang	3,339	2,839	2,586	2,177	Alaminos
Telbang	2,033	1,621	1,872	1,544	Bayambang
Tempra-Guilig	3,757	3,702	3,392	2,672	San Fabian
Tiblong	1,165	1,125	–	–	San Fabian
Tiep	2,180	2,419	2,015	1,566	Bani
Tipor	824	853	821	717	Bani
Tipuso	1,811	1,798	1,403	1,103	Urdaneta
Tobor	2,737	2,867	1,761	1,849	Malasiqui
Toboy	3,109	3,096	2,852	2,670	Asingan
Tobuan	2,604	2,539	2,565	1,872	Labrador
Tococ East	720	707	627	448	Bayambang
Tococ West	1,754	1,756	1,470	1,131	Bayambang
Tocok	3,189	2,814	2,838	2,171	San Fabian
Toketec	1,791	1,566	1,487	1,169	Tayug
Tokok Barikir	433	408	445	328	Mangatarem
Tolonguat	964	807	808	568	Malasiqui
Tomana East	1,205	1,173	1,038	790	Rosales
Tomana West	2,980	2,931	2,531	2,121	Rosales
Tombod	2,136	1,964	1,909	1,573	Urdaneta
Tombor	1,786	1,684	1,625	1,309	Binmaley
Tomling	1,223	1,564	1,521	1,115	Malasiqui
Tondol	2,794	2,596	2,480	1,961	Anda
Tonton	4,971	5,132	4,785	3,943	Lingayen
Toritori	1,761	1,924	1,921	1,621	Anda
Torre 1st	539	530	433	385	Mangatarem
Torre 2nd	864	972	841	708	Mangatarem
Torres	2,798	2,408	2,303	1,908	Mapandan
Torres Bugallon (Poblacion)	1,312	1,129	1,117	967	Mangatarem
Trenchera	3,799	3,539	2,883	2,044	Tayug
Tugui Grande	1,341	1,341	1,392	1,085	Bani
Tugui Norte	698	790	671	514	Bani
Tuliao	5,822	5,665	4,921	3,955	Santa Barbara
Tulnac	674	758	656	475	Pozorrubio
Tulong	1,212	1,167	960	718	Urdaneta
Tumbar	1,706	1,407	1,239	997	Lingayen
Tupa	1,194	1,193	1,109	1,094	Agno
Tupa	1,987	1,836	1,771	1,459	Bolinao
Turac	5,487	5,445	5,296	4,238	San Carlos
Turko	1,152	974	1,011	892	Laoac
Uli	1,370	1,742	1,585	1,295	Dasol
Umanday	5,072	4,988	4,350	3,903	Bugallon
Umando	1,281	1,218	1,147	966	Malasiqui
Umangan	1,770	1,598	1,454	1,084	Mangatarem
Ungib	1,179	1,113	923	779	San Quintin
Unzad	3,490	3,339	3,303	2,710	Urdaneta
Uyong	2,743	2,471	2,524	2,111	Labrador
Vacante	1,024	1,052	799	701	Alcala
Vacante	1,461	1,381	1,208	875	Bautista
Vacante	1,734	1,780	1,424	1,502	Binalonan
Ventinilla (Ventinilla East)	3,173	2,967	1,490	1,690	Santa Barbara
Viado	687	617	574	437	Malasiqui
Victoria	2,253	2,287	1,962	1,547	Alaminos
Victoria	1,230	1,342	1,250	680	Sual
Victory	1,225	1,327	1,113	1,031	Bolinao
Viga	1,017	899	875	951	Agno
Viga	659	634	619	362	Dasol
Villacorta	1,270	1,183	998	817	Mabini
Villanueva	2,355	2,356	2,398	2,021	Bautista
Villegas	1,638	1,627	1,595	1,376	Pozorrubio
Waig	877	863	770	665	Malasiqui
Warding	1,261	1,178	1,146	961	Bayambang
Warey	2,841	2,859	2,706	2,036	Malasiqui
Wawa	1,515	1,381	1,392	1,161	Bayambang
Wawa	1,665	1,445	1,604	1,305	Lingayen
Yatyat	1,349	1,487	1,504	1,348	Laoac
Zamora	984	924	925	717	Tayug
Zamora (Poblacion)	812	813	816	782	Mangatarem
Zaragoza	2,770	2,890	2,739	2,422	Bolinao
Zone I (Poblacion)	288	253	355	462	Bayambang
Zone I (Poblacion)	1,236	1,283	1,115	1,052	Rosales
Zone I (Poblacion)	1,430	1,582	1,759	1,740	Urdaneta
Zone II (Poblacion)	315	293	340	350	Bayambang
Zone II (Poblacion)	728	751	855	826	Rosales
Zone II (Poblacion)	2,161	2,372	2,489	2,184	Urdaneta
Zone III (Poblacion)	400	494	446	366	Bayambang
Zone III (Poblacion)	979	955	891	823	Rosales
Zone III (Poblacion)	1,149	1,208	1,001	796	Urdaneta
Zone IV (Poblacion)	699	652	723	644	Bayambang
Zone IV (Poblacion)	1,553	1,516	1,437	1,385	Rosales
Zone IV (Poblacion)	1,138	1,302	1,142	1,059	Urdaneta
Zone V (Poblacion)	1,233	1,165	1,040	865	Bayambang
Zone V (Poblacion)	1,964	2,037	1,892	1,866	Rosales
Zone V (Poblacion)	946	839	863	885	Urdaneta
Zone VI (Poblacion)	1,055	1,134	937	664	Bayambang
Zone VII (Poblacion)	1,039	830	829	544	Bayambang
Barangay	2010	2007	2000	1990	City or municipality
*Italicized names are former names.; *Dashes (–) in cells indicate unavailable census data.

[top]
