= Natividad, Pangasinan =

Municipality in Pangasinan, Philippines

Natividad
- Municipality
- Municipality of Natividad
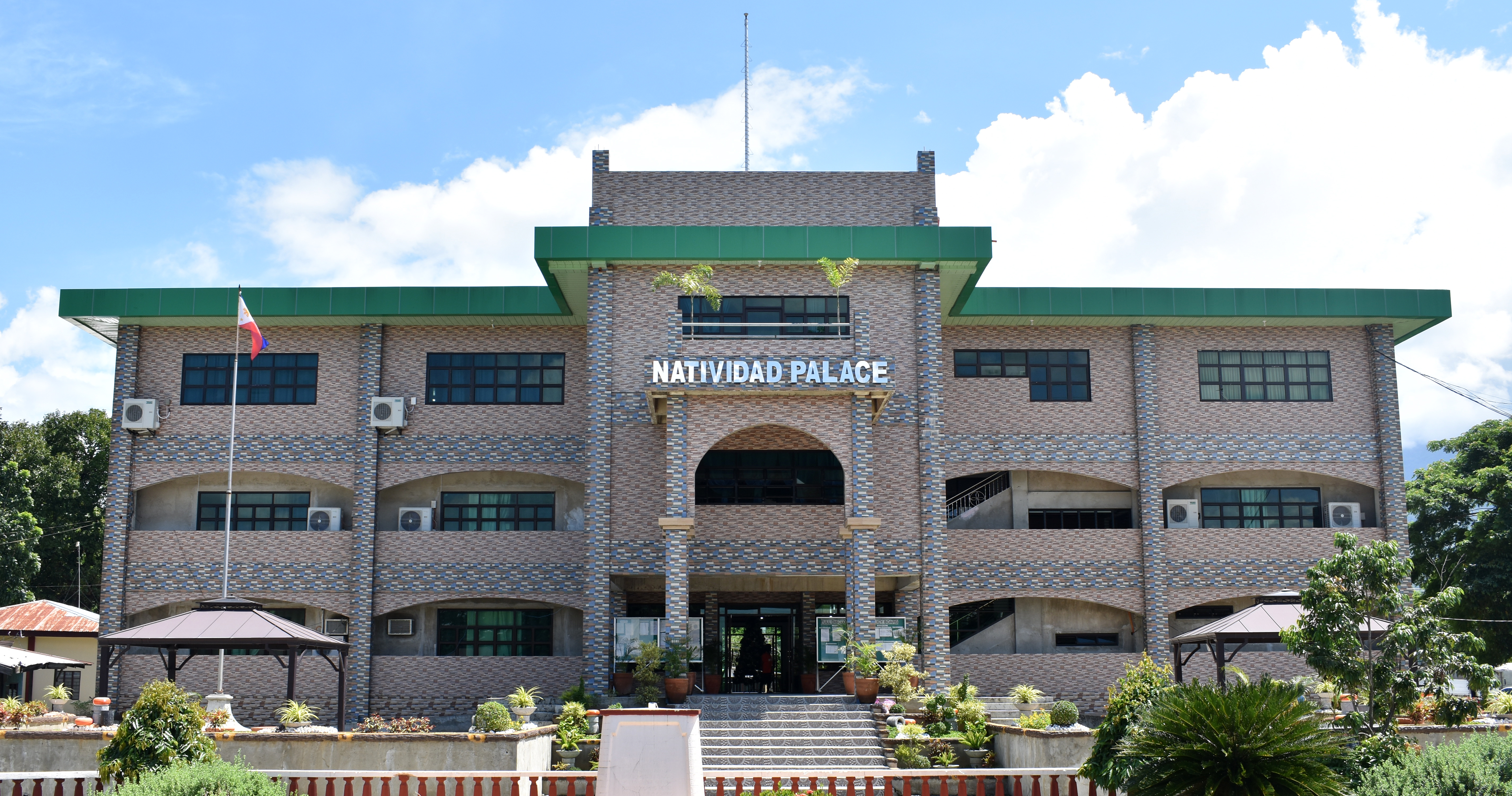
- Municipal hall

- Seal
- Motto: Lipad Natividad
- Anthem: Natividad Hymn
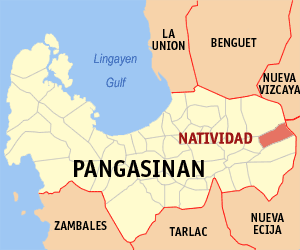
- Map of Pangasinan with Natividad highlighted
- Interactive map of Natividad
- Location within the Philippines
- Coordinates: 16°02′32″N 120°47′43″E
- Country: Philippines
- Region: Ilocos Region
- Province: Pangasinan
- Barangays: 18 (see Barangays)

Government
  - Type: Sangguniang Bayan
  - Mayor: Rosita G. Rafael
  - Vice Mayor: April Supnet
  - Municipal Council: history
  - Electorate: 18,419 voters (2025)

Area
  - Total: 134.36 km^{2} (51.88 sq mi)
- Elevation: 135 m (443 ft)
- Highest elevation: 981 m (3,219 ft)
- Lowest elevation: 60 m (200 ft)

Population (2024 census)
  - Total: 26,721
  - Density: 198.88/km^{2} (515.09/sq mi)
  - Households: 6,749

Economy
  - Income class: 3rd municipal income class
  - Poverty incidence: 11.48% (2023)
  - Revenue: ₱ 157.8 million (2024)
  - Assets: ₱ 532.5 million (2024)
  - Expenditure: ₱ 113.9 million (2024)
  - Liabilities: ₱ 57.45 million (2024)

Service provider
  - Electricity: Pangasinan 3 Electric Cooperative (PANELCO 3)
- Time zone: UTC+8 (PST)
- ZIP code: 2446
- PSGC: 0105529000
- IDD : area code: +63 (0)75
- Native languages: Pangasinan; Ilocano; Tagalog
- Website: www.natividad.gov.ph

Natividad, officially the Municipality of Natividad (Pangasinan: Baley na Natividad; Ilocano: Ili ti Natividad; Tagalog: Bayan ng Natividad), is a municipality in the province of Pangasinan, Philippines. According to the 2024 census, it has a population of 26,721 people.

== Etymology ==
There was no strong historical account as to how the town of Natividad got its name. It is believed however, that the name Natividad arose from the literal meaning of the birth or nativity of the town. The town of Natividad was born after the conversion of the community of people from the different parts of the Province of Pangasinan and neighboring provinces, into a Municipality that they came up with a name Natividad.

== History ==
The town of Natividad was once a conglomeration of barrios and sitios bounded by the Municipality of San Quintin on the south, San Nicolas on the north, and Tayug on the west.

On December 12, 1901, a group of settlers from neighbouring towns in Pangasinan and the Ilocos provinces visted the area in search of a suitable location to establish a settlement. On January 2, 1902, they returned with their families and began settling in the area, joining several groups that were already living in the territory.

Because of increased number in people and area ran by a single leader whom they appointed, plans were drawn for the organization of a municipality. Organizational meetings and activities were undertaken to pursue this noble endeavor. The enactment of Act 371 of the Philippine Commission on March 7, 1902 that converted the community into a municipality awarded these people for their efforts and hard work.

There were 11 barangays that emerged first and these are now the barangays of San Eugenio, Licud, Recodo, Barangobong, Amanit and San Modesto, from the Municipality of San Nicolas; San Narciso, Canarem and Cabuaan, from the Municipality of Tayug; and Tolin and Bucno from the Municipality of San Quintin.

Natividad’s history takes a common story of new migrants from different places with the objectives to seek for new frontiers to conquer and new place to tame for settlements. People from the various quarters of Pangasinan, La Union, Ilocos Sur and Abra constituted to be the first inhabitants of the town.

With the natural resources that the forest served, the people used these to cultivate the area and prepare the land for the production of their food supply and other needs. The present central and eastern sections of the municipality were then a dense forest wherein the people got most of their food supplies and farming materials.

Values of industry, peacefulness, kindness and religiousness guided these first settlers, despite the difficulty of communication and transportation services, which was made even worse because they lived in very distant places, they remained close and intact. Their leaders showed good and exemplary behaviors and gave their best to improve the social life of the people.

During the early part of the American sovereignty in the Philippines, an American with the name of Captain Joseph B. Batchelor of the American Army consequently made possible the foundation of a stronger and unified municipality. Captain Batchelor possessed the bearing and culture that spoke loudly on American and Anglo-Saxon traditions and ideals, thus, the inhabitants had their new and unique experiences during these times.

Captain Batchelor became a big contributor in the development of the town, guiding the people with noble examples of life, inculcating in them the American values of love of freedom and self-dissemination. In his memory, Batchelor East and Batchelor West of the town were named after him.

== Geography ==
Natividad is situated 71.72 kilometres (44.56 mi) from the provincial capital Lingayen, and 203.43 kilometres (126.41 mi) from the country's capital city of Manila.

=== Barangays ===
Natividad is politically subdivided into 18 barangays. Each barangay consists of puroks and some have sitios.

- Barangobong
- Batchelor East
- Batchelor West
- Burgos (San Narciso)
- Cacandungan
- Calapugan
- Canarem
- Luna
- Poblacion East
- Poblacion West
- Rizal
- Salud
- San Eugenio
- San Macario Norte
- San Macario Sur
- San Maximo
- San Miguel
- Silag

== Demographics ==
Population Census of Natividad
Year	Pop.	±% p.a.
1903	7,453	—
1918	9,347	+1.52%
1939	9,946	+0.30%
1948	11,780	+1.90%
1960	10,490	−0.96%
1970	13,592	+2.62%
1975	14,416	+1.19%
1980	15,246	+1.13%
1990	17,010	+1.10%
1995	18,070	+1.14%
2000	19,870	+2.06%
2007	21,560	+1.13%
2010	22,713	+1.91%
2015	24,299	+1.29%
2020	25,771	+1.25%
2024	26,721	+0.87%
Source: Philippine Statistics Authority

== Economy ==
Poverty incidence of Natividad (%)

Source: Philippine Statistics Authority

== Government ==
=== Local government ===
Natividad is part of the sixth congressional district of the province of Pangasinan. It is governed by a mayor, designated as its local chief executive, and by a municipal council as its legislative body in accordance with the Local Government Code. The mayor, vice mayor, and the councilors are elected directly by the people through an election which is being held every three years.

=== Elected officials ===
Position	Name
Mayor	Hon. Rosita G. Rafael
Vice-Mayor	Hon. Rodrigo L. Rafael
Councilors	Hon. Ma. Luisa M. Supnet
Councilors	Hon. Carlota G. Supnet
Councilors	Hon. Betha Fe R. De Guzman
Councilors	Hon. Manuelito M. Noveda
Councilors	Hon. Frederick N. Zaragoza
Councilors	Hon. Pablo G. Malla
Councilors	Hon. Tirso C. Danipog
Councilors	Hon. Edgar A. Acosta

== Education ==
The Natividad Schools District Office governs all educational institutions within the municipality. It oversees the management and operations of all private and public, from primary to secondary schools.

=== Primary and elementary schools ===
- Barangobong Elementary School
- Batchelor Elementary School
- Calapugan Elementary School
- Canarem Elementary School
- Eulogio Arciaga Elementary School
- Luna Elementary School
- Natividad Central School
- Rizal Elementary School
- Salud Elementary School
- San Eugenio Elementary School
- San Jose Elementary School
- San Macario Norte Elementary School
- San Macario Sur Elementary School
- San Maximo Elementary School
- San Miguel Elementary School
- San Narciso Norte Elementary School
- San Narciso Sur Elementary School
- Silag Elementary School

=== Secondary schools ===
- Natividad National High School
- Salud-San Eugenio National High School
- San Macario National High School
- San Miguel National High School

== Gallery ==
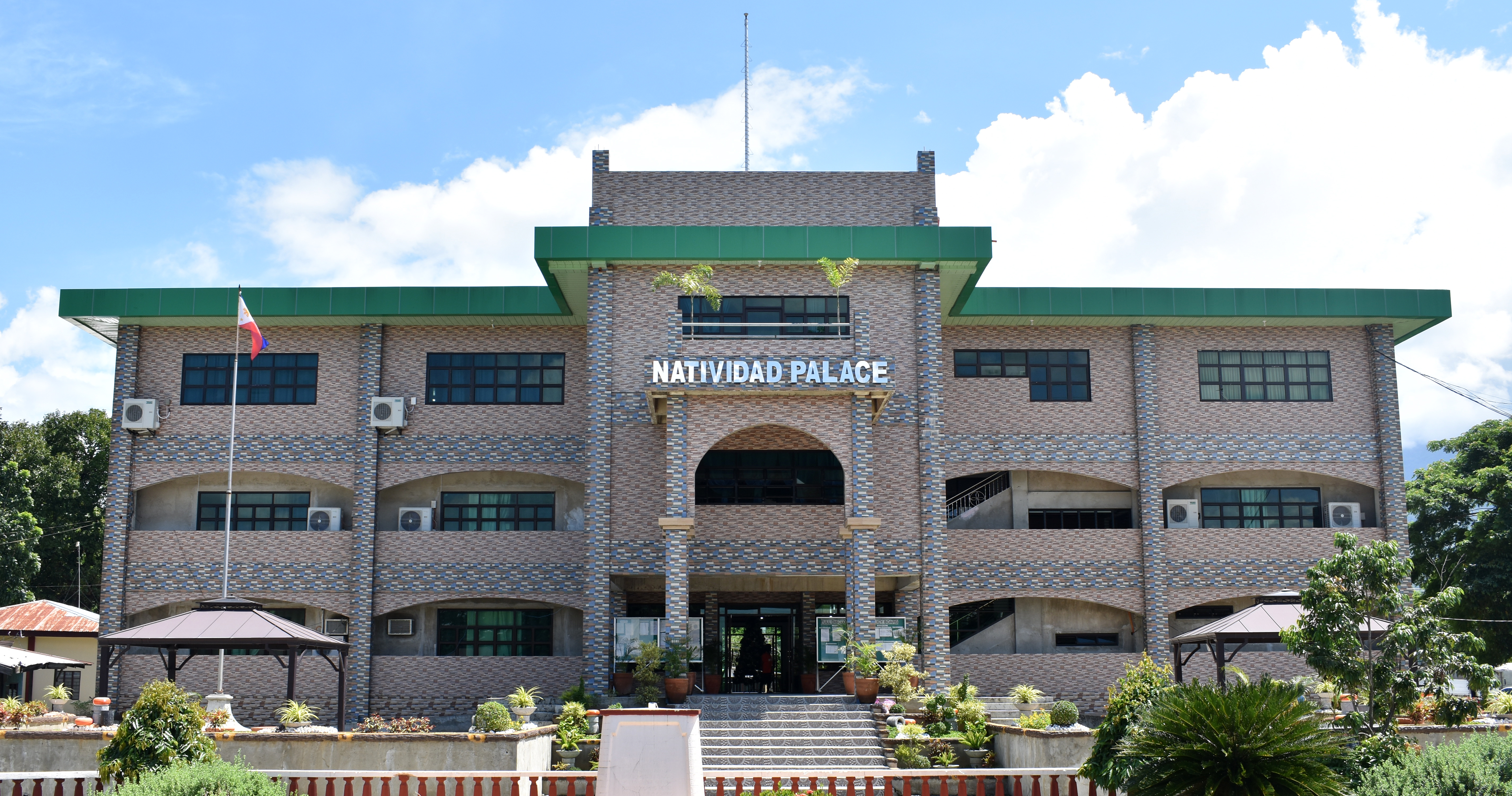
Natividad Palace

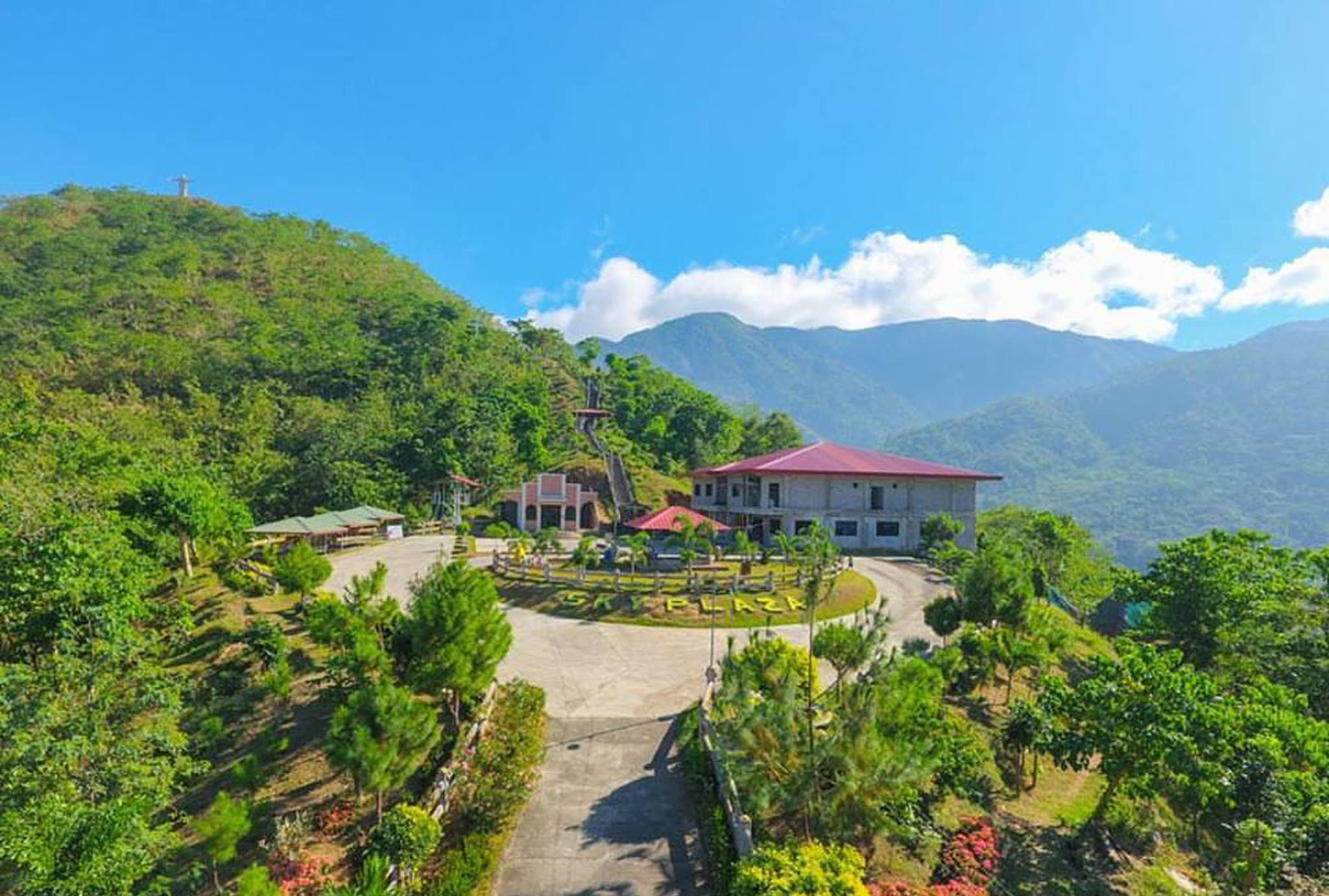
Sky Plaza

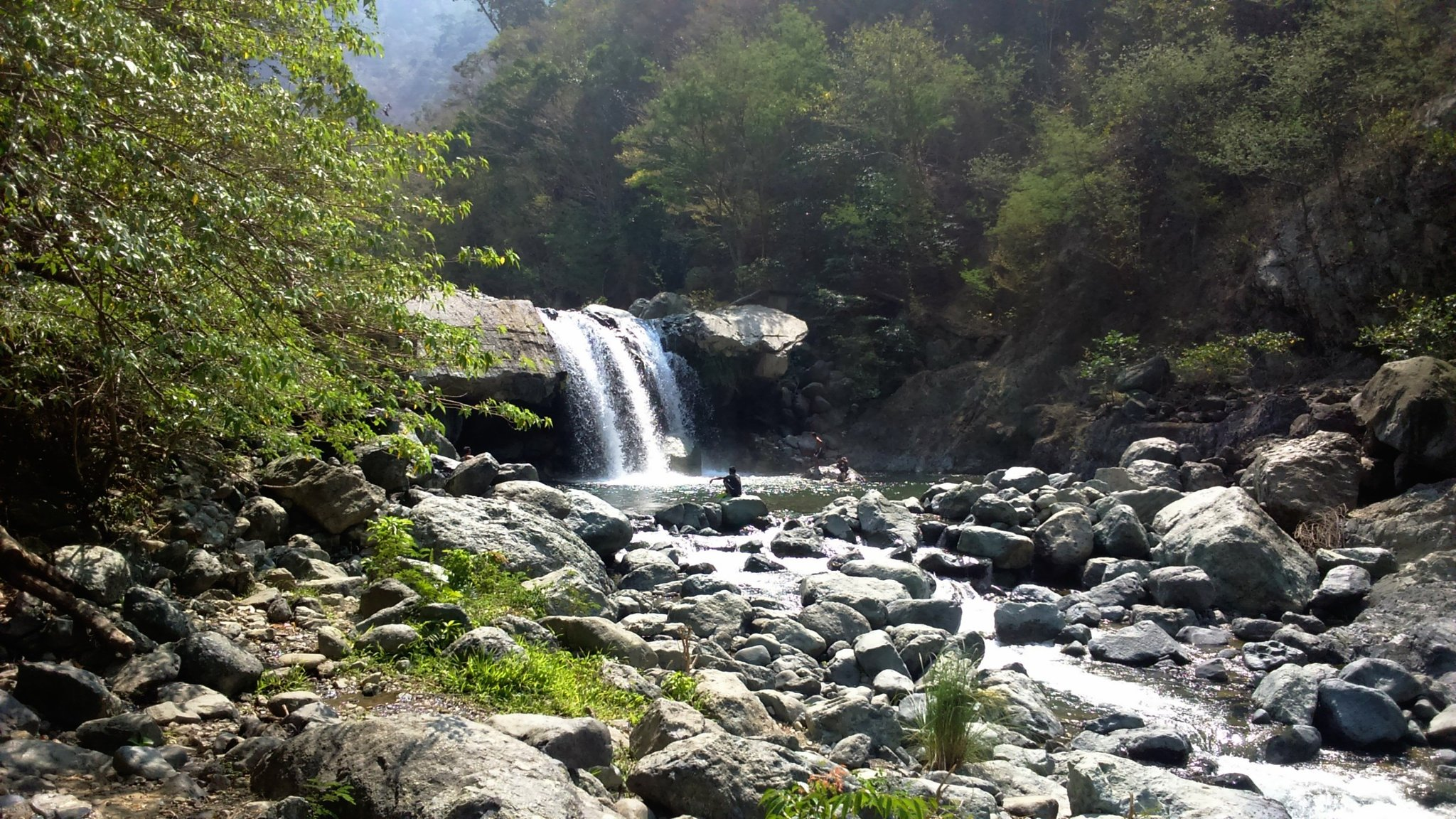
Maranum Falls

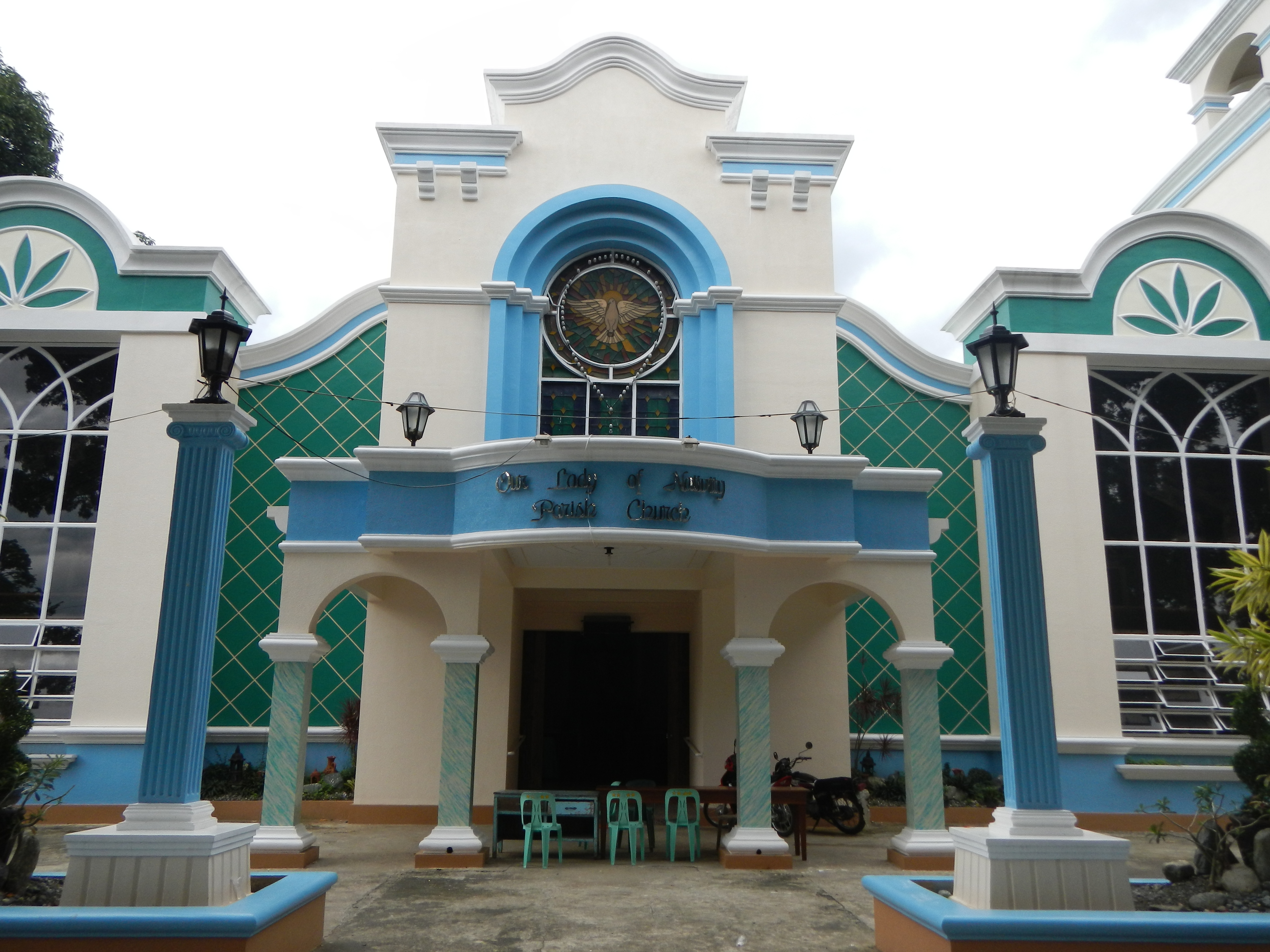
Our Lady of Nativity Parish Church
