= Laoac =

Municipality in Pangasinan, Philippines

- Municipality
- Municipality of Laoac
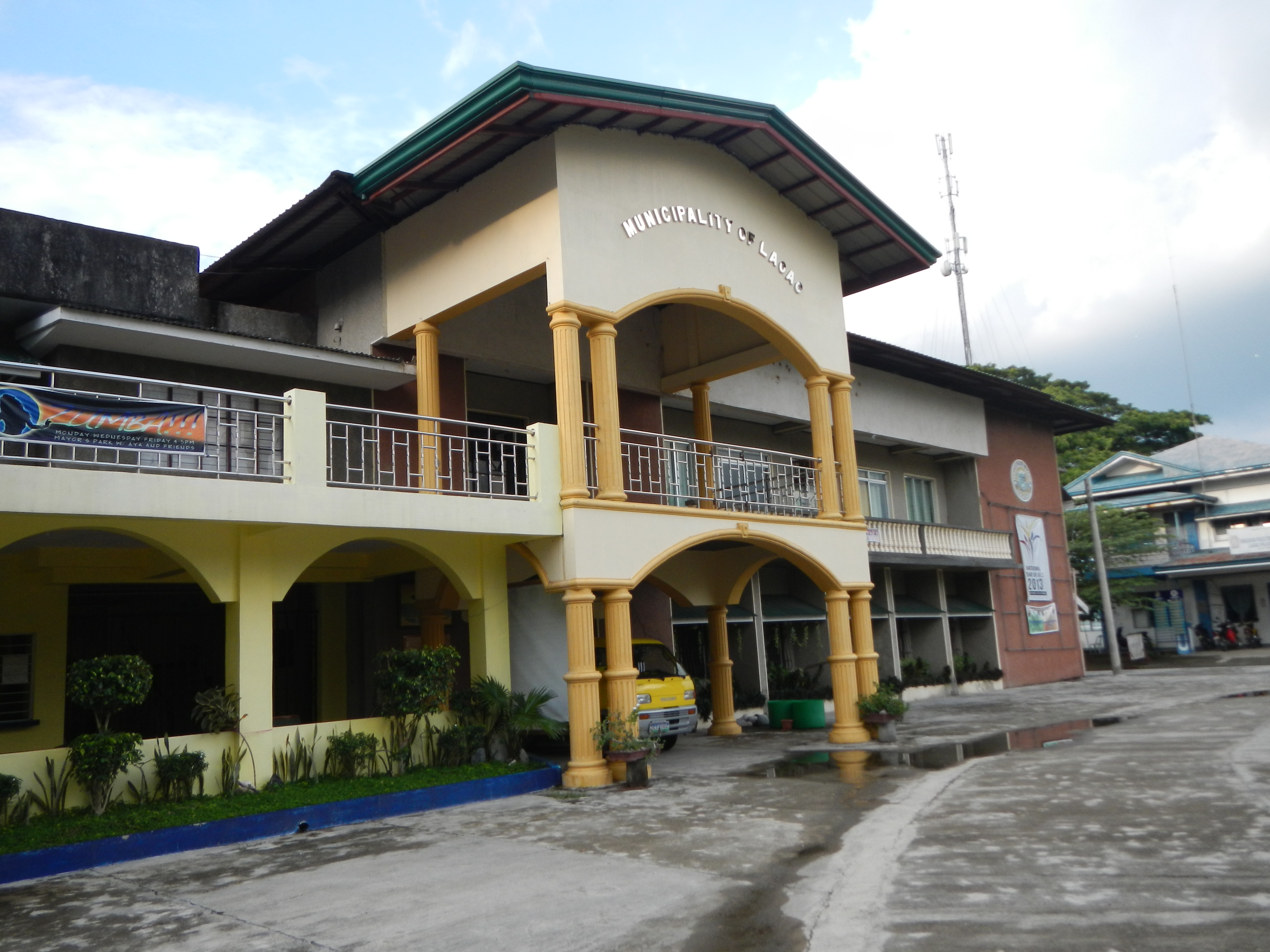
- Town Hall of Laoac

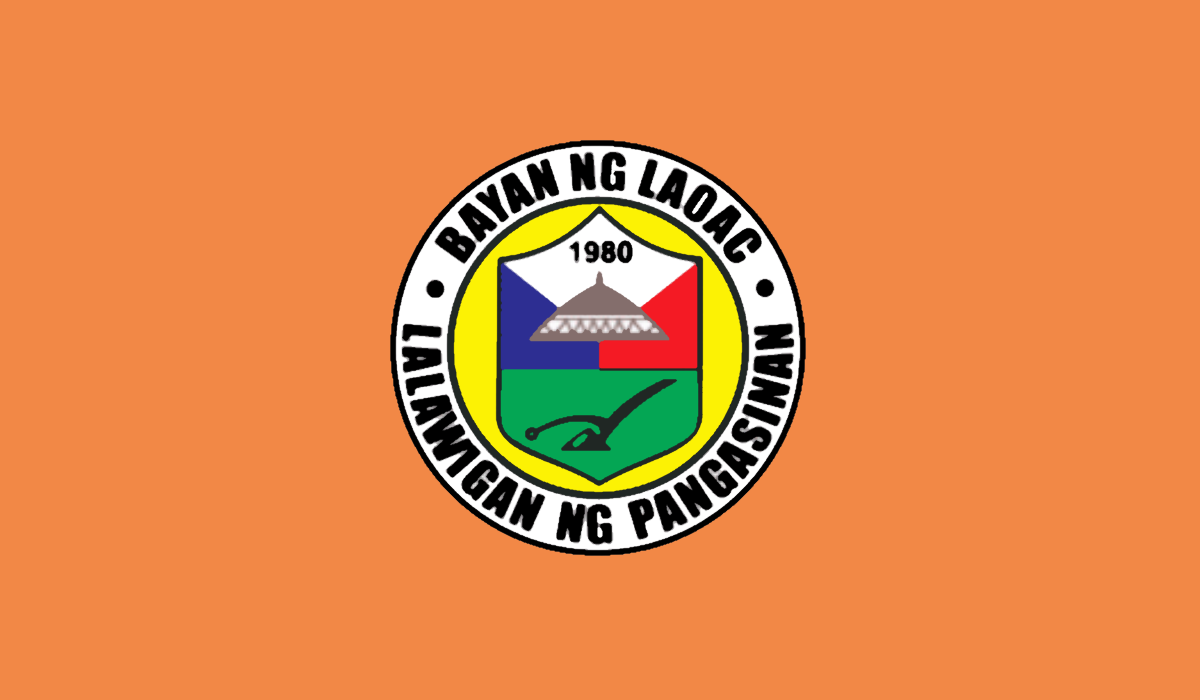
- Flag Seal
- Nickname: Pangasinan's young municipality
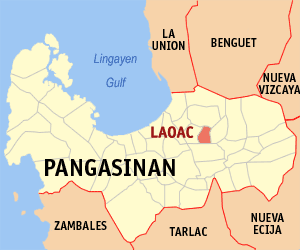
- Map of Pangasinan with Laoac highlighted
- Interactive map of Laoac
- Location within the Philippines
- Coordinates: 16°02′00″N 120°33′00″E
- Country: Philippines
- Region: Ilocos Region
- Province: Pangasinan
- District: 5th district
- Founded: March 5, 1980
- Barangays: 22 (see Barangays)

Government
  - Type: Sangguniang Bayan
  - Mayor: Ricardo D. Balderas
  - Vice Mayor: Nelson V. Gayo
  - Representative: Ramon V. Guico III
  - Municipal Council: Members: Dani Jay G. Rebugio; Andrew R. Celino; Eleno B. Olande; Faustino Q. Soriano Jr.; Edelyn P. Rebugio; Rogelio P. Godoy; Edgar M. Elleazar; Darwin C. Rodillas
  - Electorate: 22,825 voters (2025)

Area
  - Total: 40.50 km^{2} (15.64 sq mi)
- Elevation: 31 m (102 ft)
- Highest elevation: 776 m (2,546 ft)
- Lowest elevation: 0 m (0 ft)

Population (2024 census)
  - Total: 34,550
  - Density: 853.1/km^{2} (2,209/sq mi)
  - Households: 8,811

Economy
  - Income class: 2nd municipal income class
  - Poverty incidence: 10.81% (2023)
  - Revenue: ₱ 195.6 million (2024)
  - Assets: ₱ 62.95 million (2024)
  - Expenditure: ₱ 172.1 million (2024)
  - Liabilities: ₱ 37.52 million (2024)

Service provider
  - Electricity: Pangasinan 3 Electric Cooperative (PANELCO 3)
- Time zone: UTC+8 (PST)
- ZIP code: 2437
- PSGC: 0105548000
- IDD : area code: +63 (0)75
- Native languages: Pangasinan; Ilocano; Tagalog
- Website: www.laoac.gov.ph

Laoac [ˈlawak], officially the Municipality of Laoac (Pangasinan: Baley na Laoac; Ilocano: Ili ti Laoac; Tagalog: Bayan ng Laoac), is a municipality in the province of Pangasinan, Philippines. According to the 2024 census, it has a population of 34,550 people.

== History ==
Laoac is the province's youngest municipality. Since the early 1900s, unsuccessful attempts to convert Laoac - then the biggest barrio in Manaoag - into a separate municipality were made until the revival of such movement by Westrimundo Tabayoyong. This led to the establishment of Laoac as a municipality through Republic Act No. 6485, enacted on June 17, 1972, constituting 20 barrios separated from Manaoag, including Laoac (present-day Poblacion) which was designated as the seat of government. The implementation, however, was delayed by the declaration of nationwide martial law later that year. By virtue of Batas Pambansa Blg. 18 issued in 1979, the first municipal officials were elected, with Tabayoyong as mayor, and assumed office on March 5, 1980, formally inaugurating the corporate existence of the municipality.

Tabayoyong served until his assassination at the municipal plaza on September 6, 1985.

== Geography ==
Laoac is situated 42.55 kilometres (26.44 mi) from the provincial capital Lingayen, and 192.96 kilometres (119.90 mi) from the country's capital city of Manila.

=== Barangays ===
Laoac is politically subdivided into 22 barangays. Each barangay consists of puroks and some have sitios.

- Anis
- Balligi
- Banuar
- Botigue
- Caaringayan
- Domingo Alarcio (Cabilaoan East)
- Cabilaoan
- Cabulalaan
- Calaoagan
- Calmay
- Casampagaan
- Casanestebanan
- Casantiagoan
- Inmanduyan
- Poblacion (Laoac)
- Lebueg
- Maraboc
- Nanbagatan
- Panaga
- Talogtog
- Turko
- Yatyat

=== Climate ===
Climate data for Laoac, Pangasinan
Month	Jan	Feb	Mar	Apr	May	Jun	Jul	Aug	Sep	Oct	Nov	Dec	Year
Mean daily maximum °C (°F)	29 (84)	29 (84)	30 (86)	32 (90)	33 (91)	33 (91)	33 (91)	33 (91)	33 (91)	32 (90)	31 (88)	29 (84)	31 (88)
Mean daily minimum °C (°F)	21 (70)	21 (70)	22 (72)	23 (73)	24 (75)	24 (75)	24 (75)	24 (75)	23 (73)	23 (73)	22 (72)	22 (72)	23 (73)
Average precipitation mm (inches)	127.5 (5.02)	115.8 (4.56)	129.7 (5.11)	141.1 (5.56)	248.2 (9.77)	165 (6.5)	185.3 (7.30)	161.9 (6.37)	221.4 (8.72)	299.5 (11.79)	199 (7.8)	188.7 (7.43)	2,183.1 (85.93)
Average rainy days	17	17	17	15	20	19	19	29	21	20	17	19	230
Source: World Weather Online

== Demographics ==
Population census of Laoac
Year	Pop.	±% p.a.
1980	19,252	—
1990	22,864	+1.73%
1995	24,662	+1.43%
2000	26,723	+1.74%
2007	28,266	+0.78%
2010	29,456	+1.51%
2015	31,497	+1.28%
2020	34,128	+1.70%
2024	34,550	+0.30%
Source: Philippine Statistics Authority

== Economy ==
Poverty incidence of Laoac (%)

Source: Philippine Statistics Authority

== Government ==
=== Local government ===
Laoac is part of the fifth congressional district of the province of Pangasinan. It is governed by a mayor, designated as its local chief executive, and by a municipal council as its legislative body in accordance with the Local Government Code. The mayor, vice mayor, and the councilors are elected directly by the people through an election which is being held every three years.

=== Elected Officials ===
Members of the Municipal Council (2022–2025)
Position	Name
Governor	Ramon V. Guico III
Vice Governor	Mark DG. Lambino
Congressman	Ramon N. Guico Jr.
Board Member	Rosary Gracia "Chinky" Perez-Tababa
Board Member	Nicholi Jan Louie Q. Sison
Mayor	Ricardo D. Balderas
Vice-Mayor	Nelson V. Gayo
Councilors	Glaiza B. Olande-Collado
Councilors	Wilson D. Quinto
Councilors	Yolanda S. Rufo
Councilors	Charito T. Calica
Councilors	Rolando N. Ramos
Councilors	Edgar M. Elleazar
Councilors	Benedict E. Lopena
Councilors	Ruben A. Allado
Liga ng mga Barangay President	Marissa R. Celino
Sangguniang Kabataan Federation President	Peiry Velasco

== Education ==
The Laoac Schools District Office governs all educational institutions within the municipality. It oversees the management and operations of all private and public elementary and high schools.

=== Primary and elementary schools ===
- Botigue Elementary School
- Cabilaoan Elementary School
- Cabu-Cala Elementary School
- Don Rufino Tabayoyong Central School
- Lebueg Elementary School
- Limos-Turko Elementary School
- Nanbagatan Elementary School
- Quevedo-Anisca Elementary School
- Rufino Leal-Torralba Elementary School (Cascalinta)
- Yatyat Elementary School
- Yatyat Annex Elementary School

=== Secondary schools ===
- Cabilaoan Agro-Industrial HS
- Calmay Integrated School
- Castusu Integrated School
- Don Maximo G. Gombio Panaga-Tabao Integrated School
- Full of Grace Montessori and High School
- Laoac National High School
