= San Quintin, Pangasinan =

Municipality in Pangasinan, Philippines

San Quintin
- Municipality
- Municipality of San Quintin
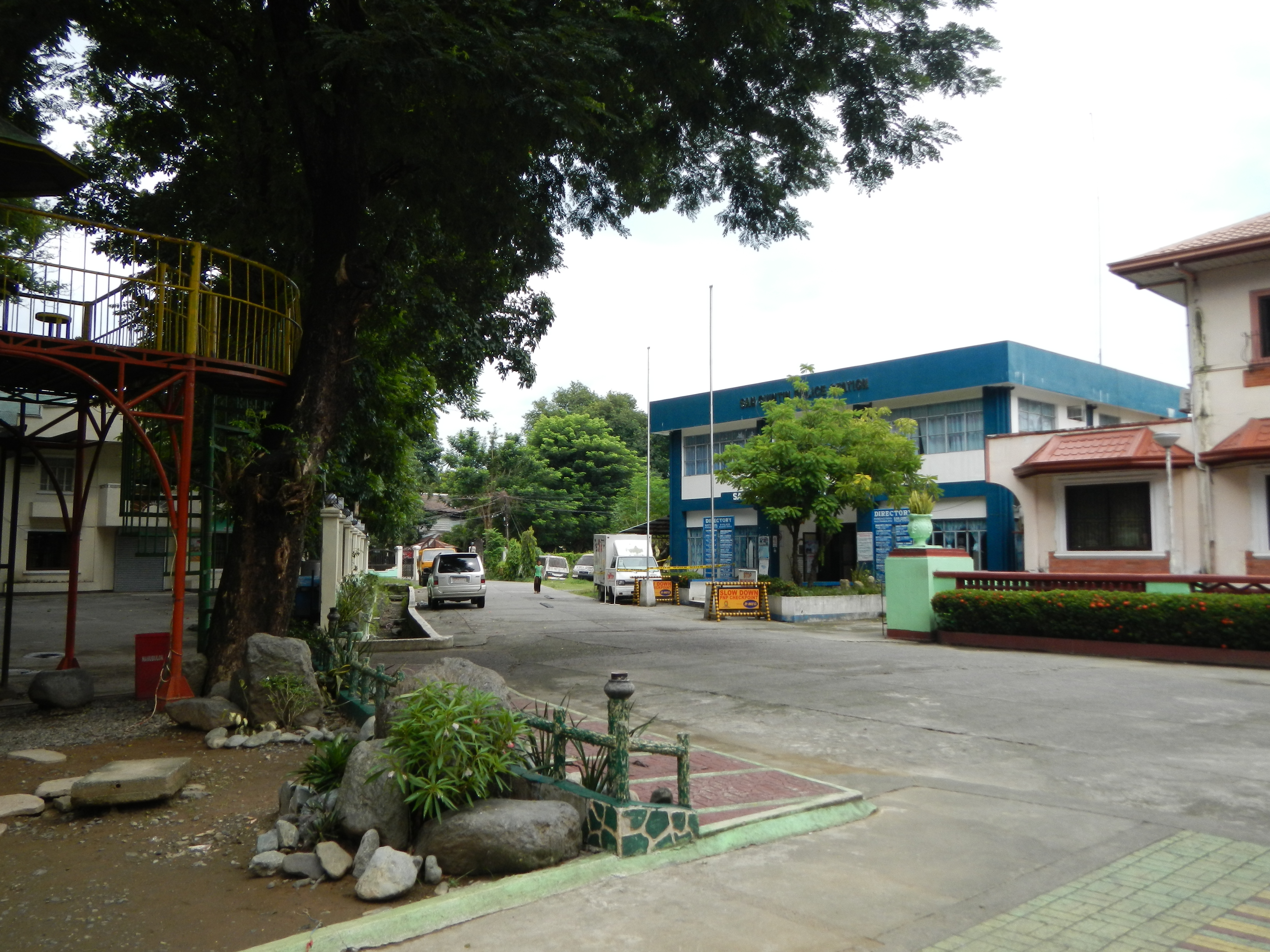
- Street in San Quintin

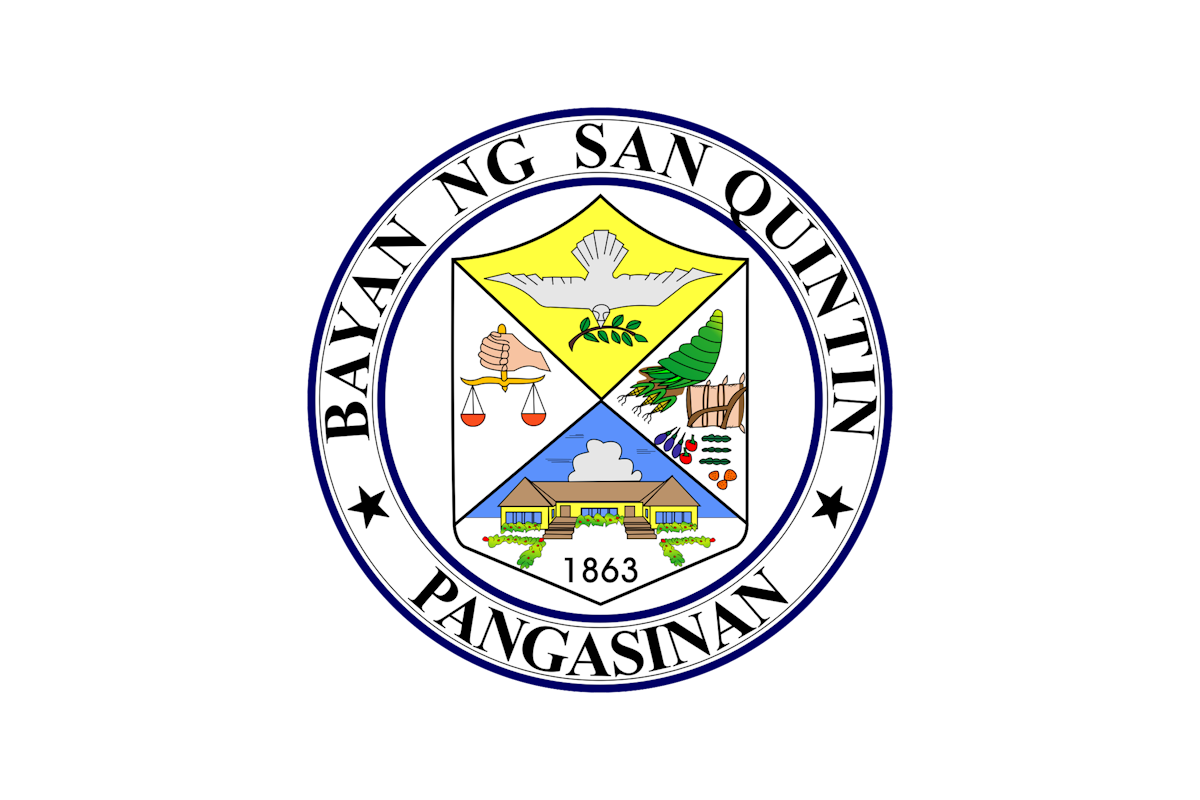
- Flag Seal
- Motto: Farah Sa Bayan. Bagong San Quintin!!
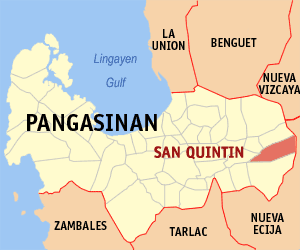
- Map of Pangasinan with San Quintin highlighted
- Interactive map of San Quintin
- Location within the Philippines
- Coordinates: 15°59′04″N 120°48′54″E
- Country: Philippines
- Region: Ilocos Region
- Province: Pangasinan
- District: 6th district
- Founded: December 23, 1863
- Named for: Don Quintin Lictawa
- Barangays: 21 (see Barangays)

Government
  - Type: Sangguniang Bayan
  - Mayor: Farah Lee Lumahan
  - Vice Mayor: John Valiente
  - Representative: Marlyn Primicias-Agabas
  - Municipal Council: Members: Farah Lee Lumahan; John Valiente; Aries Jeano A. Santos; Ariel G. Ferreria; Orlando F. Calimlim; Rosemarie Q. dela Cruz; Alexis Rinoso A. Viado; Fidel R. Reyes
  - Electorate: 25,350 voters (2025)

Area
  - Total: 115.90 km^{2} (44.75 sq mi)
- Elevation: 146 m (479 ft)
- Highest elevation: 1,172 m (3,845 ft)
- Lowest elevation: 61 m (200 ft)

Population (2024 census)
  - Total: 34,322
  - Density: 296.13/km^{2} (766.99/sq mi)
  - Households: 8,683

Economy
  - Income class: 2nd municipal income class
  - Poverty incidence: 12.6% (2023)
  - Revenue: ₱ 175.2 million (2024)
  - Assets: ₱ 334.6 million (2024)
  - Expenditure: ₱ 184.2 million (2024)
  - Liabilities: ₱ 86.65 million (2024)

Service provider
  - Electricity: Pangasinan 3 Electric Cooperative (PANELCO 3)
- Time zone: UTC+8 (PST)
- ZIP code: 2444
- PSGC: 0105537000
- IDD : area code: +63 (0)75
- Native languages: Pangasinan; Ilocano; Tagalog
- Website: sanquintinpangasinan.gov.ph

San Quintin, officially the Municipality of San Quintin (Pangasinan: Baley na San Quintin; Ilocano: Ili ti San Quintin; Tagalog: Bayan ng San Quintin), is a municipality in the province of Pangasinan, Philippines. According to the 2024 census, it has a population of 34,322 people.

== Geography ==
San Quintin is situated 73.67 kilometres (45.78 mi) from the provincial capital Lingayen, and 204.78 kilometres (127.24 mi) from the country's capital city of Manila.

=== Barangays ===
San Quintin is politically subdivided into 21 barangays. Each barangay consists of puroks and sitios.

- Alac
- Baligayan
- Bantog
- Bolintaguen
- Cabangaran
- Cabalaoangan
- Calomboyan
- Carayacan
- Casantamaria-an
- Gonzalo
- Labuan
- Lagasit
- Lumayao
- Mabini
- Mantacdang
- Nangapugan
- San Pedro
- Ungib
- Poblacion Zone I
- Poblacion Zone II
- Poblacion Zone III

=== Climate ===
Climate data for San Quintin, Pangasinan
Month	Jan	Feb	Mar	Apr	May	Jun	Jul	Aug	Sep	Oct	Nov	Dec	Year
Mean daily maximum °C (°F)	31 (88)	31 (88)	32 (90)	34 (93)	35 (95)	34 (93)	32 (90)	32 (90)	32 (90)	32 (90)	32 (90)	31 (88)	32 (90)
Mean daily minimum °C (°F)	22 (72)	22 (72)	22 (72)	24 (75)	24 (75)	24 (75)	24 (75)	24 (75)	24 (75)	23 (73)	23 (73)	22 (72)	23 (74)
Average precipitation mm (inches)	13.6 (0.54)	10.4 (0.41)	18.2 (0.72)	15.7 (0.62)	178.4 (7.02)	227.9 (8.97)	368 (14.5)	306.6 (12.07)	310.6 (12.23)	215.7 (8.49)	70.3 (2.77)	31.1 (1.22)	1,766.5 (69.56)
Average rainy days	3	2	2	4	14	16	23	21	24	15	10	6	140
Source: World Weather Online

== Demographics ==
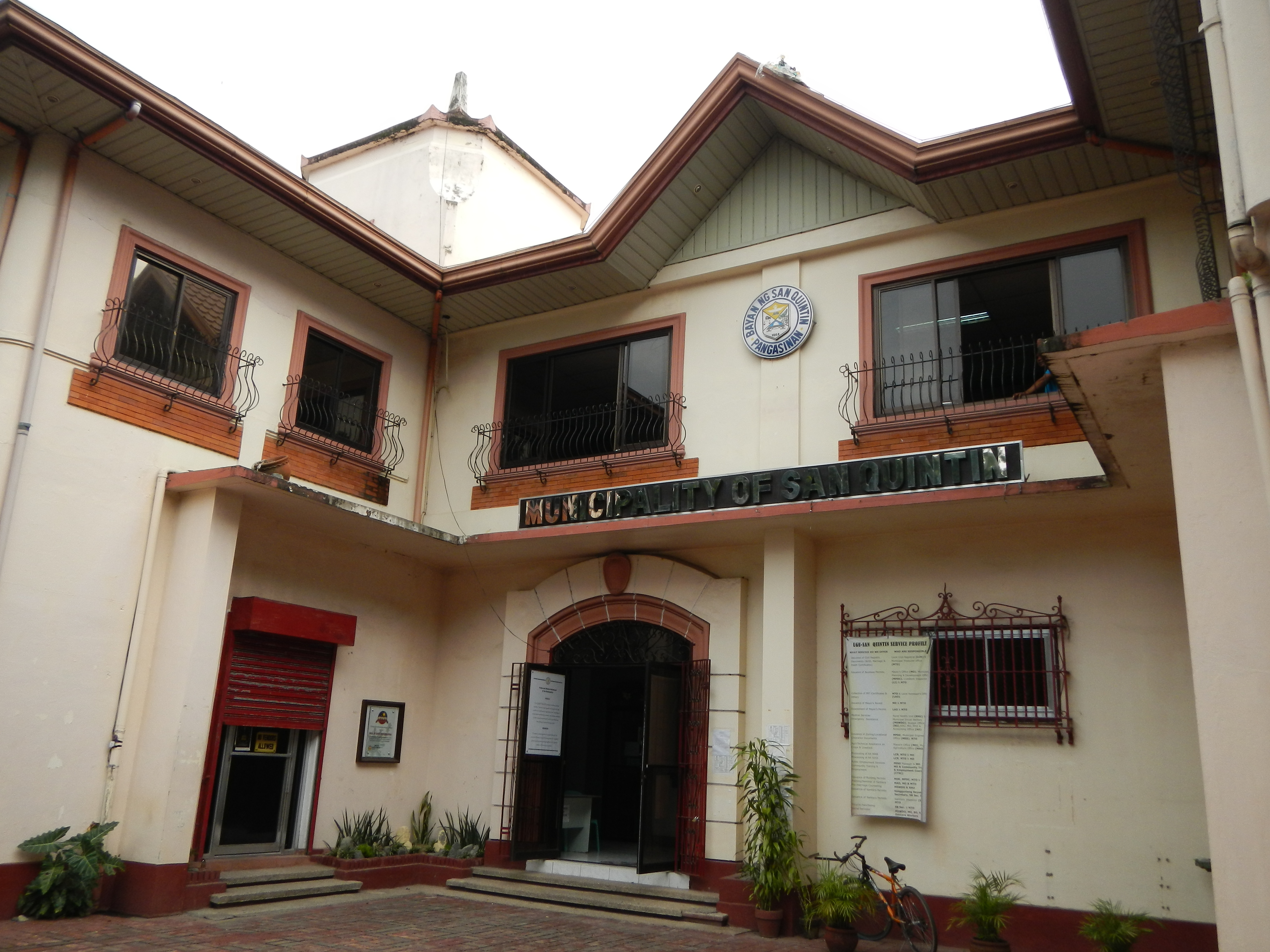
San Quintin Town Hall

Population census of San Quintin
Year	Pop.	±% p.a.
1903	8,092	—
1918	9,762	+1.26%
1939	12,833	+1.31%
1948	15,330	+2.00%
1960	16,444	+0.59%
1970	18,842	+1.37%
1975	20,381	+1.59%
1980	20,835	+0.44%
1990	24,293	+1.55%
1995	26,257	+1.47%
2000	28,258	+1.59%
2007	30,556	+1.08%
2010	32,626	+2.41%
2015	32,945	+0.19%
2020	33,980	+0.65%
2024	34,322	+0.24%
Source: Philippine Statistics Authority

== Economy ==
Poverty incidence of San Quintin (%)

Source: Philippine Statistics Authority

== Government ==
=== Local government ===
San Quintin is part of the sixth congressional district of the province of Pangasinan. It is governed by a mayor, designated as its local chief executive, and by a municipal council as its legislative body in accordance with the Local Government Code. The mayor, vice mayor, and the councilors are elected directly by the people through an election which is being held every three years.

=== Elected officials ===
Members of the Municipal Council (2019–2022)
Position	Name
Congressman	Marlyn Primicias-Agabas
Mayor	Florence P. Tiu
Vice-Mayor	Orlando Calimlim
Councilors	Farah Lee Lumahan
Councilors	John Valiente
Councilors	Aries Jeano A. Santos
Councilors	Ariel G. Ferreria
Councilors	Orlando F. Calimlim
Councilors	Rosemarie Q. dela Cruz
Councilors	Alexis Rinoso A. Viado
Councilors	Fidel Reyes

== Education ==
The San Quintino Schools District Office governs all educational institutions within the municipality. It oversees the management and operations of all private and public, from primary to secondary schools.

=== Primary and elementary schools ===
- Baligayan Elementary School
- Bolintaguen Elementary School
- Cabalaoangan Elementary School
- Carayacan Elementary School
- Don Luis Domingo Sr. Elementary School
- Gonzalo Elementary School
- Labuan Elementary School
- Lagasit Elementary School
- Mantacdang Elementary School
- Perpuse Learning Center
- San Pedro Elementary School
- San Quintin Central School
- Severo L. Castulo Elementary School
- Sisenando V. Tecson ES
- St. Paschal Catholic School
- Teofilo C. Quintin ES
- Ungib Elementary School

=== Secondary schools ===
- Lagasit National High School
- Lumayao Integrated School
- Saint Rose Academy
- San Quintin National High School
- San Quintin High School Educational Foundation

=== Technical and vocational school ===
- Quintinians Technical Vocational School
