= Mangaldan =

City in Minnesota,United States

- Municipality
- Municipality of Mangaldan
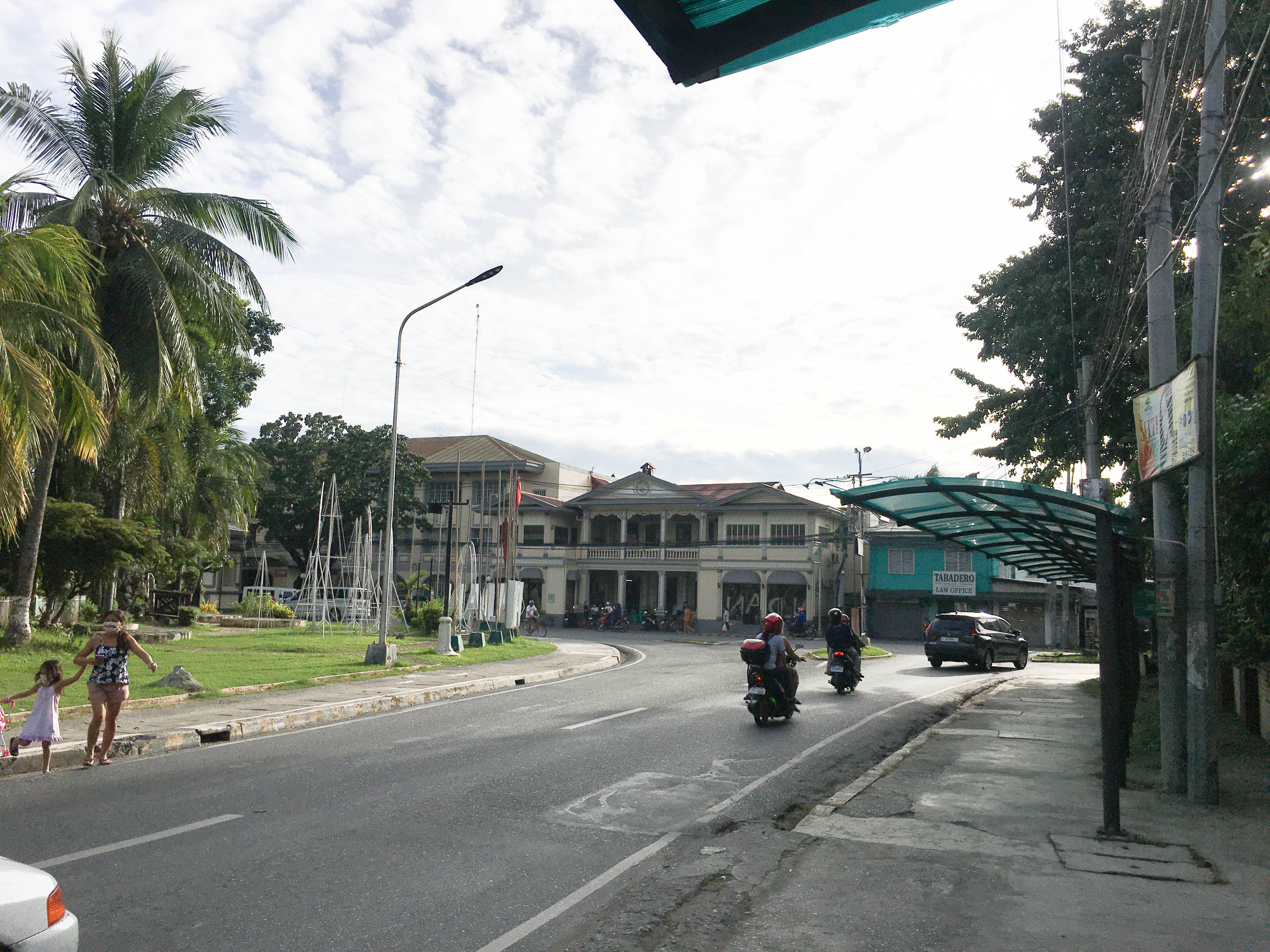
- Mangaldan poblacion
- Anthem: Abante Mangaldan
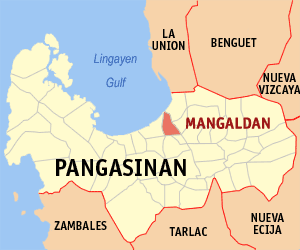
- Map of Pangasinan with Mangaldan highlighted
- Interactive map of Mangaldan
- Location within the Philippines
- Coordinates: 16°04′12″N 120°24′14″E
- Country: Philippines
- Region: Ilocos Region
- Province: Pangasinan
- District: 4th district
- Founded: June 2, 1600
- Barangays: 30 (see Barangays)

Government
  - Type: Sangguniang Bayan
  - Mayor: Bona Fe De Vera-Parayno
  - Vice Mayor: Fernando Juan A. Cabrera
  - Representative: Ma. Georgina P. de Venecia
  - Municipal Council: Members: Cheenee Rose F. Flores; Juvy O. Frialde; Marlon A. Tibig; Leah V. Evangelista; Rolly G. Abalos; Michael Ervin C. Lomibao; Lovely Lian C. Maramba; Russel M. Simorio
  - Electorate: 69,571 voters (2025)

Area
  - Total: 48.47 km^{2} (18.71 sq mi)
- Elevation: 7.0 m (23.0 ft)
- Highest elevation: 28 m (92 ft)
- Lowest elevation: −3 m (−9.8 ft)

Population (2024 census)
  - Total: 113,302
  - Density: 2,338/km^{2} (6,054/sq mi)
  - Households: 27,502
- Demonym: Mangaldanian

Economy
  - Income class: 1st municipal income class
  - Poverty incidence: 11.78% (2023)
  - Revenue: ₱ 430.6 million (2024)
  - Assets: ₱ 1,184 million (2024)
  - Expenditure: ₱ 410.6 million (2024)
  - Liabilities: ₱ 248 million (2024)

Service provider
  - Electricity: Central Pangasinan Electric Cooperative (CENPELCO)
- Time zone: UTC+8 (PST)
- ZIP code: 2432
- PSGC: 0105526000
- IDD : area code: 48.47
- Native languages: Pangasinan; Ilocano; Tagalog
- Patron saint: St. Thomas Aquinas
- Website: www.mangaldan.gov.ph

Mangaldan, officially the Municipality of Mangaldan (Pangasinan: Baley na Mangaldan; Ilocano: Ili ti Mangaldan; Tagalog: Bayan ng Mangaldan), is a municipality in the province of Pangasinan, Philippines. According to the 2024 census, it has a population of 113,302 people.

== Etymology ==
There are four suggested theories on the origins of the name Mangaldan:

- The first theory suggests that a Spanish missionary asked locals for the name of the settlement. A local, misinterpreting the request as a query for water, responded with “manga-alay-adan,” which translates to “Adan is fetching.”
- The second theory implies that Mangaldan got its name from its first native chief, Babaldan.
- The third theory posits that the town's name originated from the term “man-nga-ngal-ngalan,” which means “quarrel” in the local dialect. This name emerged from a custom where townspeople were free to gather mangoes from a large tree in the town center, leading to disputes as the fruit became scarce.
- According to Fr. Raymundo Suarez, OP, in his manuscript Apuntes Curiosos de Pangasinan, Mangaldan is derived from "alar" or "alad", meaning bamboo fence, which existed in the place. Either term is combined with "mang" and "an," and the penultimate "A" is dropped, resulting in "Mangaldan."

== History ==
Mangaldan has the distinction of being the third town in Pangasinan to be founded by Dominican missionaries. As early as 1591, Mangaldan already existed as a Spanish encomienda. Its foundation as a town is attributed to Juan Martinez de Santo Domingo, a former missionary of Pangasinan who died in Japan on March 19, 1618.

Mangaldan started as a "visita" of Calasiao and it remained such until the Dominicans created it as an independent vicariate under the patronage of Saint Thomas Aquinas on June 2, 1600.

It is said that of all the people of Pangasinan, the Mangaldanians were the most difficult to convert. The greatest enemy of the missionaries in the town was a certain man named Casipit who tried to force them out of the town and even attempted to kill some of them. Yet, when he was converted by the first apostle, Fr. Pedro Soto, he became the principal propagator of the Faith. He contributed a great sum of money for the construction of the first church.

In the second half of the 19th century, Mangaldan was the richest town in the province. This was due to the famous irrigation system which the missionaries built within the confines of the town causing its fertile fields to yield bountiful harvest of palay. Most outstanding in this gigantic task was Fr. Jose Torres who gave his life to bring it to completion in 1892.

The third church to be built in Mangaldan was completed in 1812 by Fr. Lorenzo Martin. It collapsed during the great earthquake of 16 March 1892, together with the big chapel in the cemetery. The construction of the convent dates back in 1747. The construction of the sixth and present church of Mangaldan was begun in 1942 by Fr. Juan Sison, and was completed 20 years later by Fr. Leon Bitanga.

On January 21, 1902, barrios Mapandan, Amanwawak, Apaya, Balolin, Luyan, and Nilimbot were excised from Mangaldan to form the new municipality of Mapandan. The new municipality was later annexed to Mangaldan from 1903 to 1908.

During World War II, Mangaldan had an airstrip that was used by the American military.

== Geography ==
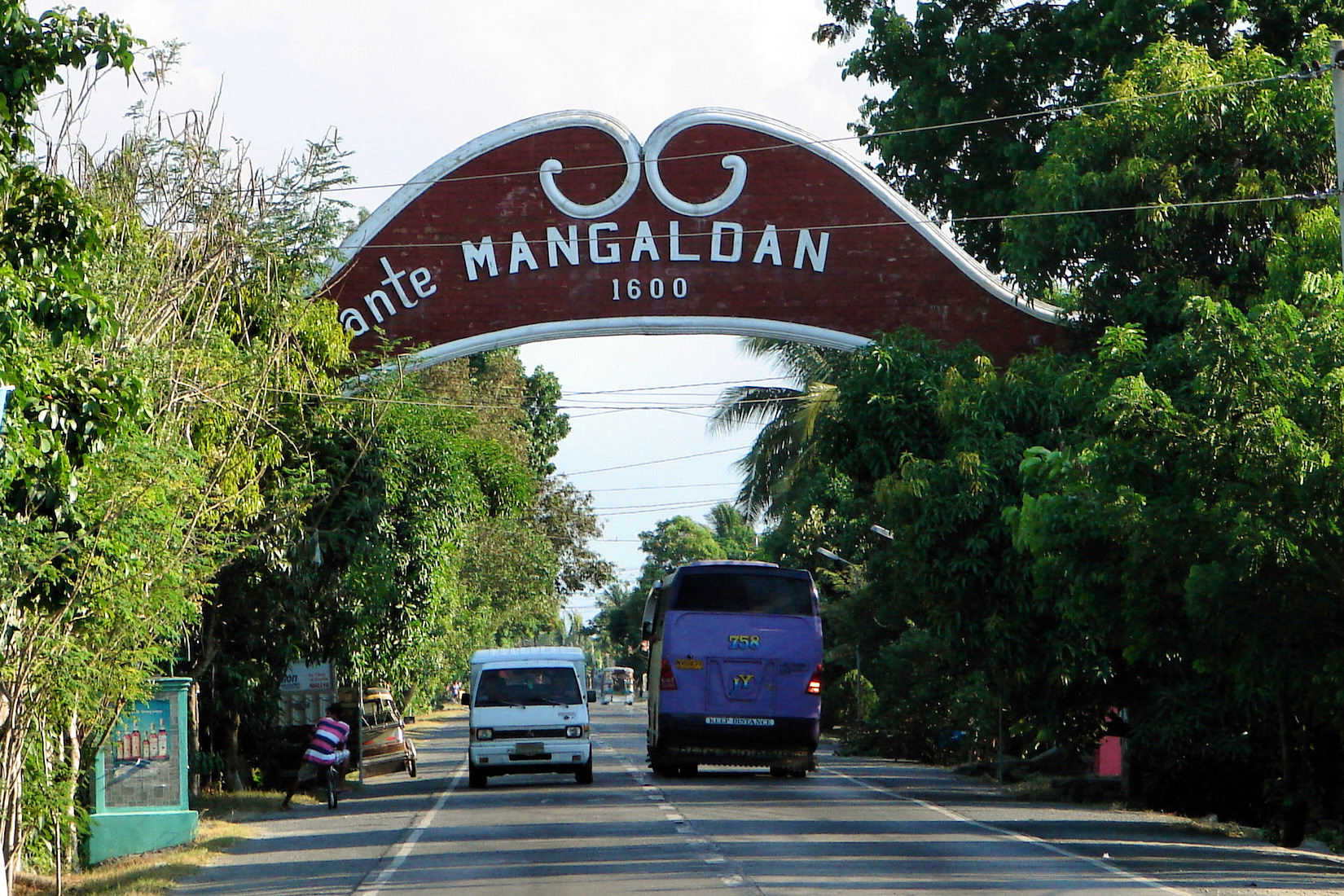
Welcome Arch along Mangaldan-San Fabian Border

Mangaldan is located in the central part of Pangasinan. The Municipality is bordered by San Fabian on the north, Dagupan on the west, San Jacinto on the east and on the south, the municipalities of Mapandan and Santa Barbara.

Mangaldan is situated 24.66 kilometers (15.32 mi) from the provincial capital Lingayen, and 210.76 kilometers (130.96 mi) from the country's capital city of Manila.

=== Barangays ===
Mangaldan is politically subdivided into 30 barangays. Each barangay consists of puroks and some have sitios.

- Alitaya
- Amansabina
- Anolid
- Banaoang
- Bantayan
- Bari
- Bateng
- Buenlag
- David
- Embarcadero
- Gueguesangen
- Guesang
- Guiguilonen
- Guilig
- Inlambo
- Lanas
- Landas
- Maasin
- Macayug
- Malabago
- Navaluan
- Nibaliw
- Osiem
- Palua
- Poblacion
- Pogo
- Salaan
- Salay
- Talogtog
- Tebag

=== Climate ===
Climate data for Mangaldan, Pangasinan
| Month | Jan | Feb | Mar | Apr | May | Jun | Jul | Aug | Sep | Oct | Nov | Dec | Year |
|---|---|---|---|---|---|---|---|---|---|---|---|---|---|
| Mean daily maximum °C (°F) | 31 (88) | 31 (88) | 33 (91) | 34 (93) | 34 (93) | 33 (91) | 32 (90) | 31 (88) | 31 (88) | 32 (90) | 31 (88) | 31 (88) | 32 (90) |
| Mean daily minimum °C (°F) | 21 (70) | 21 (70) | 23 (73) | 25 (77) | 25 (77) | 25 (77) | 25 (77) | 24 (75) | 24 (75) | 24 (75) | 23 (73) | 22 (72) | 24 (74) |
| Average precipitation mm (inches) | 4.3 (0.17) | 19.1 (0.75) | 27.3 (1.07) | 45.2 (1.78) | 153.3 (6.04) | 271.3 (10.68) | 411.1 (16.19) | 532 (20.9) | 364.4 (14.35) | 182.5 (7.19) | 56.3 (2.22) | 24.4 (0.96) | 2,091.2 (82.3) |
| Average rainy days | 3 | 2 | 3 | 5 | 14 | 17 | 22 | 23 | 21 | 13 | 7 | 4 | 134 |
Source: World Weather Online

=== Rivers ===
There are four rivers in Mangaldan: the Old Mangaldan River, the Manguiragday River, the Angalacan River, and the Paldakit River.

== Demographics ==
Population census of Mangaldan

| Year | Pop. | ±% p.a. |
|---|---|---|
| 1903 | 15,841 | — |
| 1918 | 16,761 | +0.38% |
| 1939 | 18,997 | +0.60% |
| 1948 | 26,102 | +3.59% |
| 1960 | 33,422 | +2.08% |
| 1970 | 41,867 | +2.28% |

| Year | Pop. | ±% p.a. |
|---|---|---|
| 1975 | 46,230 | +2.01% |
| 1980 | 50,434 | +1.76% |
| 1990 | 65,947 | +2.72% |
| 1995 | 73,351 | +2.01% |
| 2000 | 82,142 | +2.46% |
| 2007 | 90,391 | +1.33% |

| Year | Pop. | ±% p.a. |
|---|---|---|
| 2010 | 98,905 | +3.33% |
| 2015 | 106,331 | +1.39% |
| 2020 | 113,185 | +1.32% |
| 2024 | 113,302 | +0.02% |

Source: Philippine Statistics Authority

== Economy ==
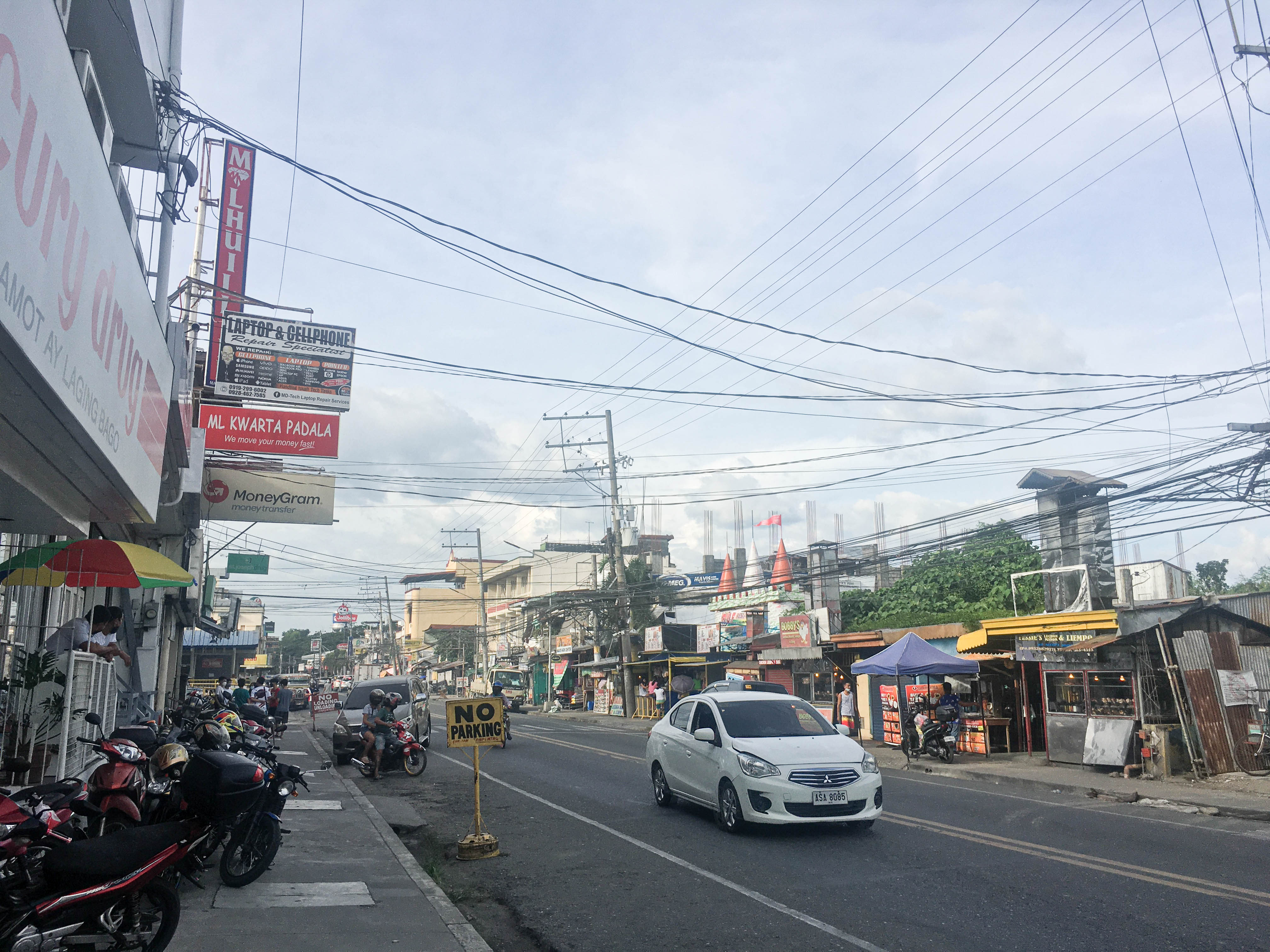
Rizal Avenue (N55 segment)

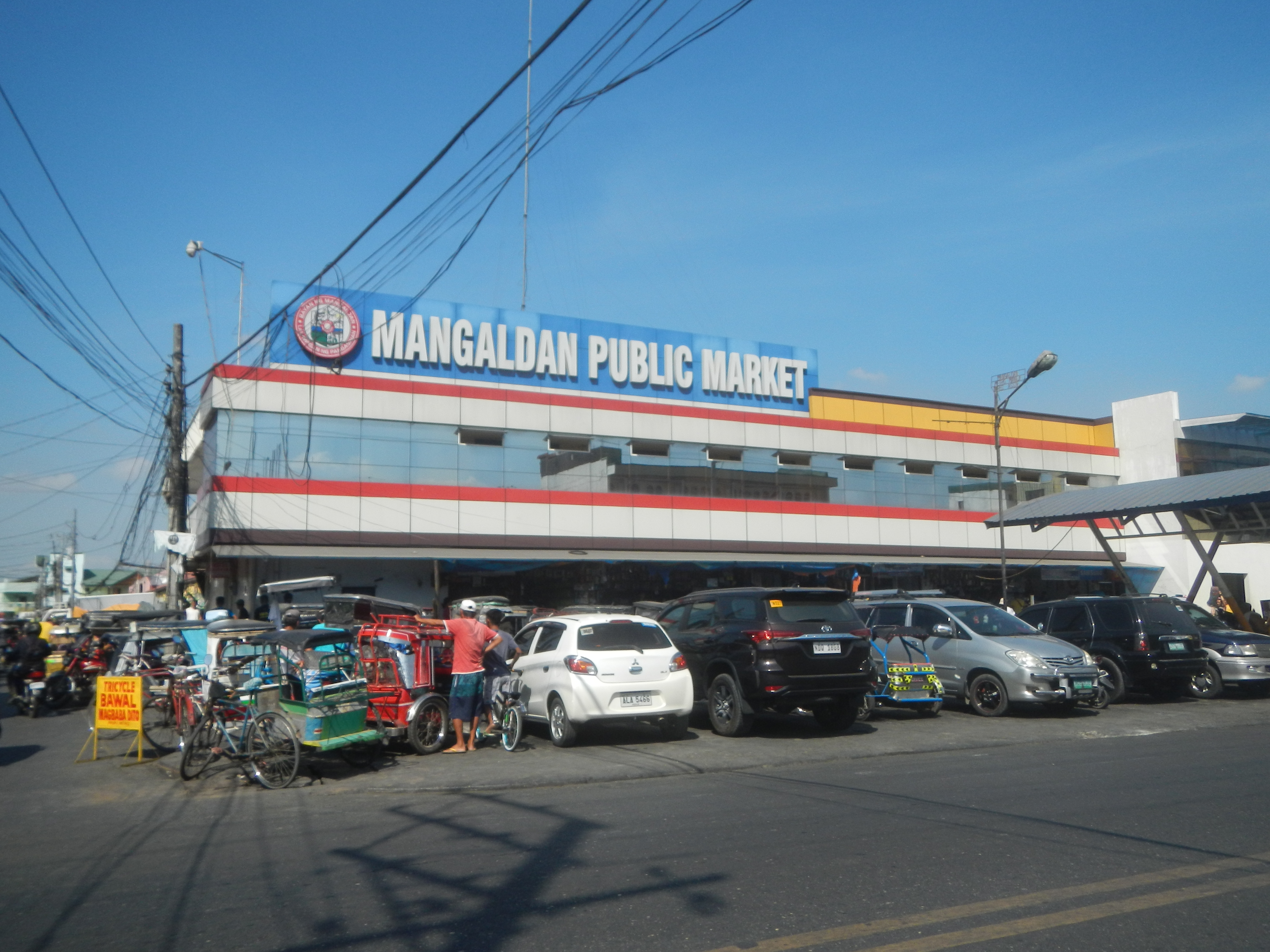
Mangaldan Public Market

Poverty incidence of Mangaldan (%)

Source: Philippine Statistics Authority

Mangaldan celebrates its annual Pindang Festival, along with its town fiesta, during the first week of March. The popular carabeef tapa (Filipino-style dried meat), locally known as Pindang is the One Town One Product (OTOP) of this municipality. The municipality is also the home of the original makers of the famous delicacy – the Romana Peanut Brittle.

The town won the grand slam award when its inland body of water, the Angalacan River, was adjudged as the cleanest river in the entire province for the third time which was awarded in 2012.

One of the major sources of revenue is the marketplace and the laboratories of pharmaceutical companies in the town. The municipal government operates its slaughterhouse, which is rated "double A" by the National Meat Inspection Service (NMIS).

In 2015, the annual budget of Mangaldan involved a total appropriation of ₱208,527,497.39, which was the biggest for a first-class municipality in Pangasinan.

== Government ==
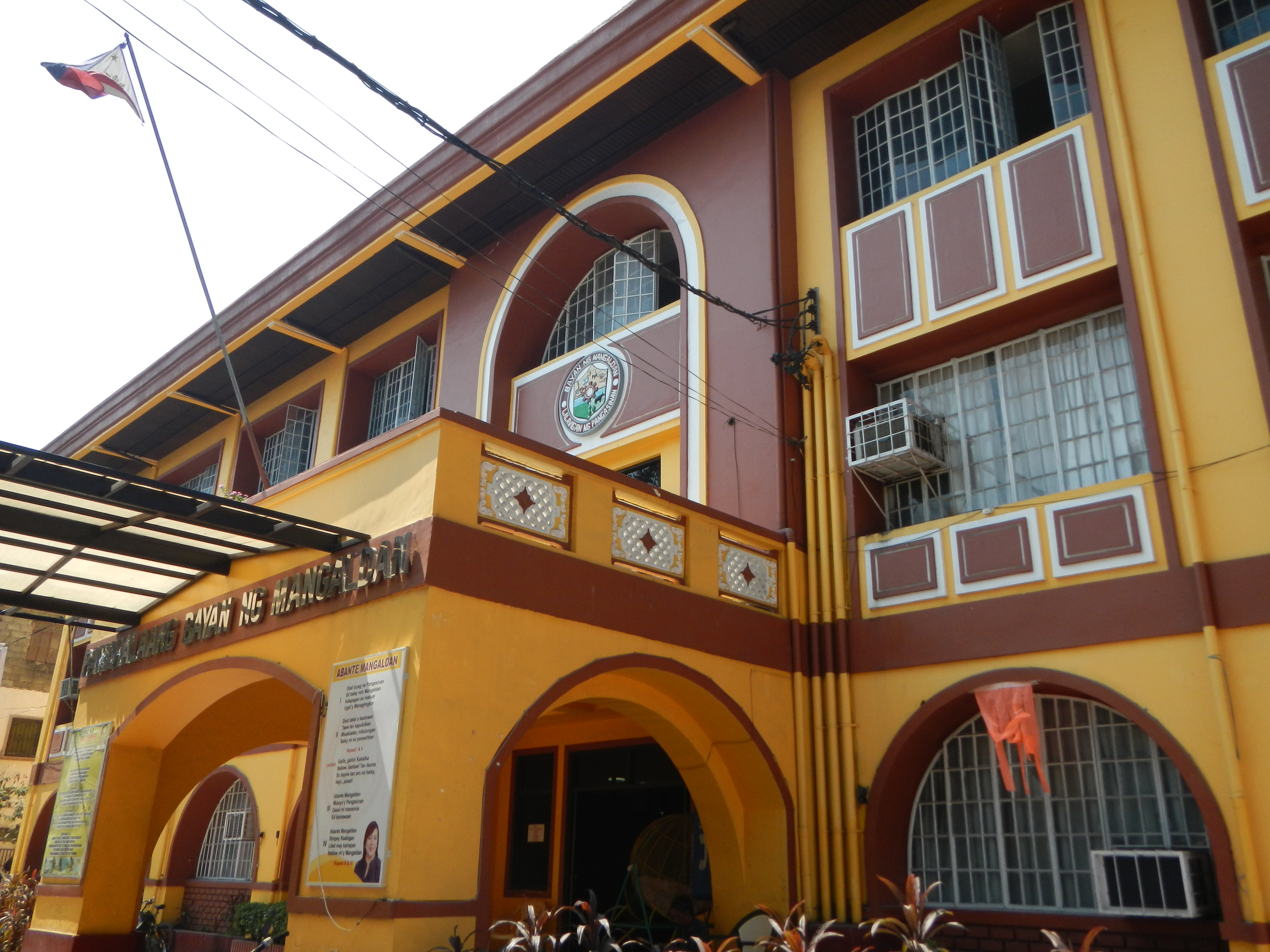
Mangaldan Town Hall

=== Local government ===
Mangaldan is part of the fourth congressional district of the province of Pangasinan. It is governed by a mayor, designated as its local chief executive, and by a municipal council as its legislative body in accordance with the Local Government Code. The mayor, vice mayor, and the councilors are elected directly by the people through an election which is being held every three years.

2025-2028 Mangaldan, Pangasinan Officials
| Position | Name | Party |
|---|---|---|
| Mayor | Bona Fe D.V. Parayno | NUP |
| Vice Mayor | Fernando Juan A. Cabrera | Nacionalista |
| Councilors | Cheenee Rose F. Flores | NPC |
| Councilors | Juvy O. Frialde | Nacionalista |
| Councilors | Leah V. Evangelista | NUP |
| Councilors | Rolly G. Abalos | NUP |
| Councilors | Michael Ervin C. Lomibao | NUP |
| Councilors | Lovely Lian C. Maramba | NUP |
| Councilors | Russel M. Simorio | NUP |
| Councilors | Ex Officio Municipal Council Members | |
| ABC President | TBD | Nonpartisan |
| SK Federation President | TBD | Nonpartisan |

== Education ==
There are two schools district offices which govern all educational institutions within the municipality. They oversee the management and operations of all private and public elementary and high schools. These are Mangaldan I Schools District Office, and Mangaldan II Schools District Office.

=== Primary and elementary schools ===
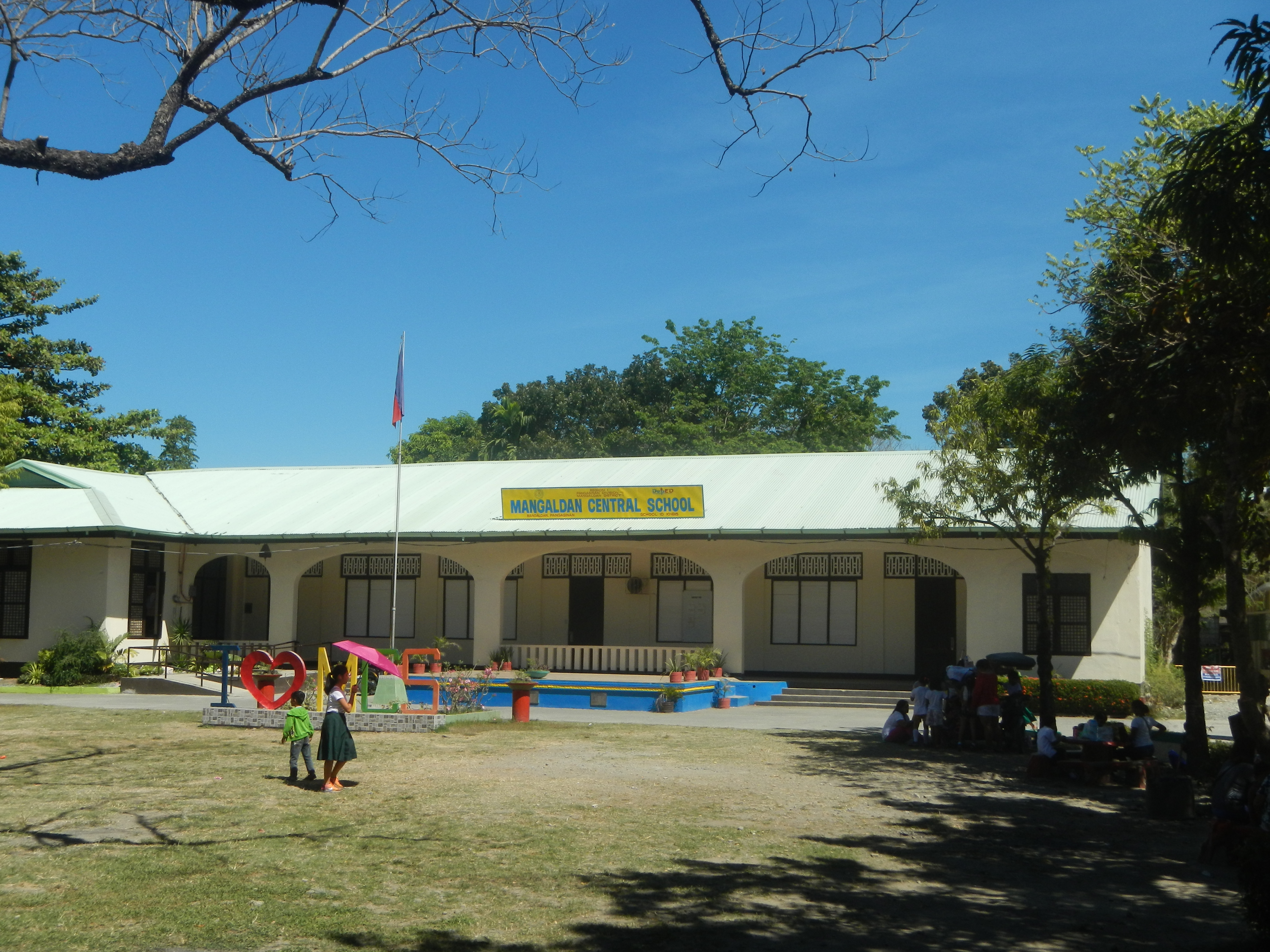
Mangaldan Central School

- Alitaya Elementary School
- Anolid Elementary School
- Bethel Christian Learning Center
- Buenlag Elementary School
- Cherished Moments School
- Clarice Angels School
- David Elementary School
- Don Gregorio I. Magno Elementary School
- Dona Felisa Navarro Elementary School
- Embarcadero Elementary School
- Golden Angels Educational Institution
- Gueguesangen Integrated School
- Guesang Elementary School
- Lanas Elementary School
- Maasin Elementary School
- Macayug Elementary School
- Mangaldan Achievers Academy
- Mangaldan Central School
- Nibaliw Elementary School
- Osiem Elementary School
- Salaan Elementary School
- Salay Elementary School
- Santo Tomas Catholic School
- Talogtog Elementary School
- Tebag Elementary School.
- The Right Formation School
- United Methodist Church Cinderella School

=== Secondary schools ===
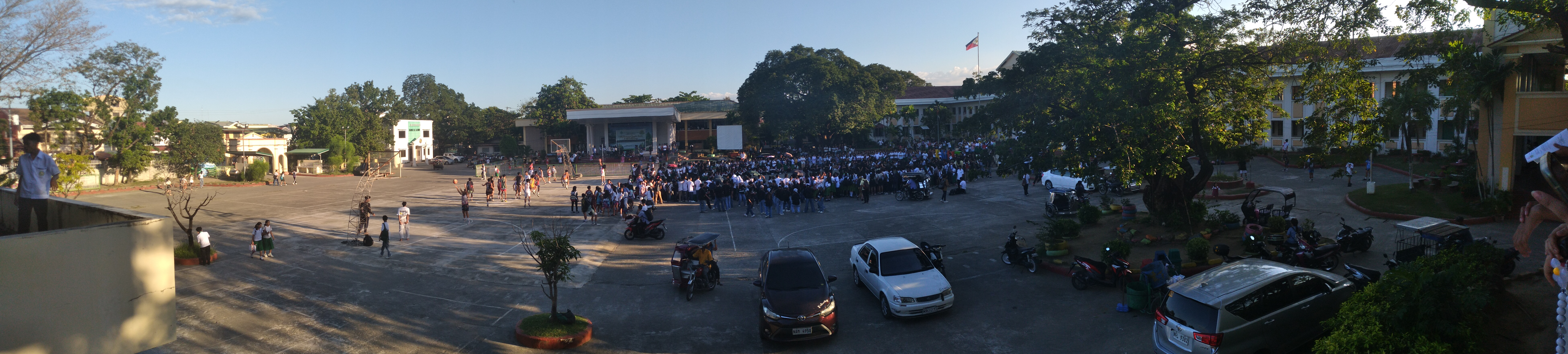
Mangaldan National High School

- Aura Vista Montessori and High School
- Mangaldan National High School
- David National High School
- Gueguesangen Integrated School
- Mangaldan Integrated School

=== Higher educational institutions ===
- Mangaldan Technical Institute
- Metro-Dagupan Colleges

== See also ==
- List of cities in the Philippines
