= Mapandan =

Municipality in Pangasinan, Philippines

- Municipality
- Municipality of Mapandan
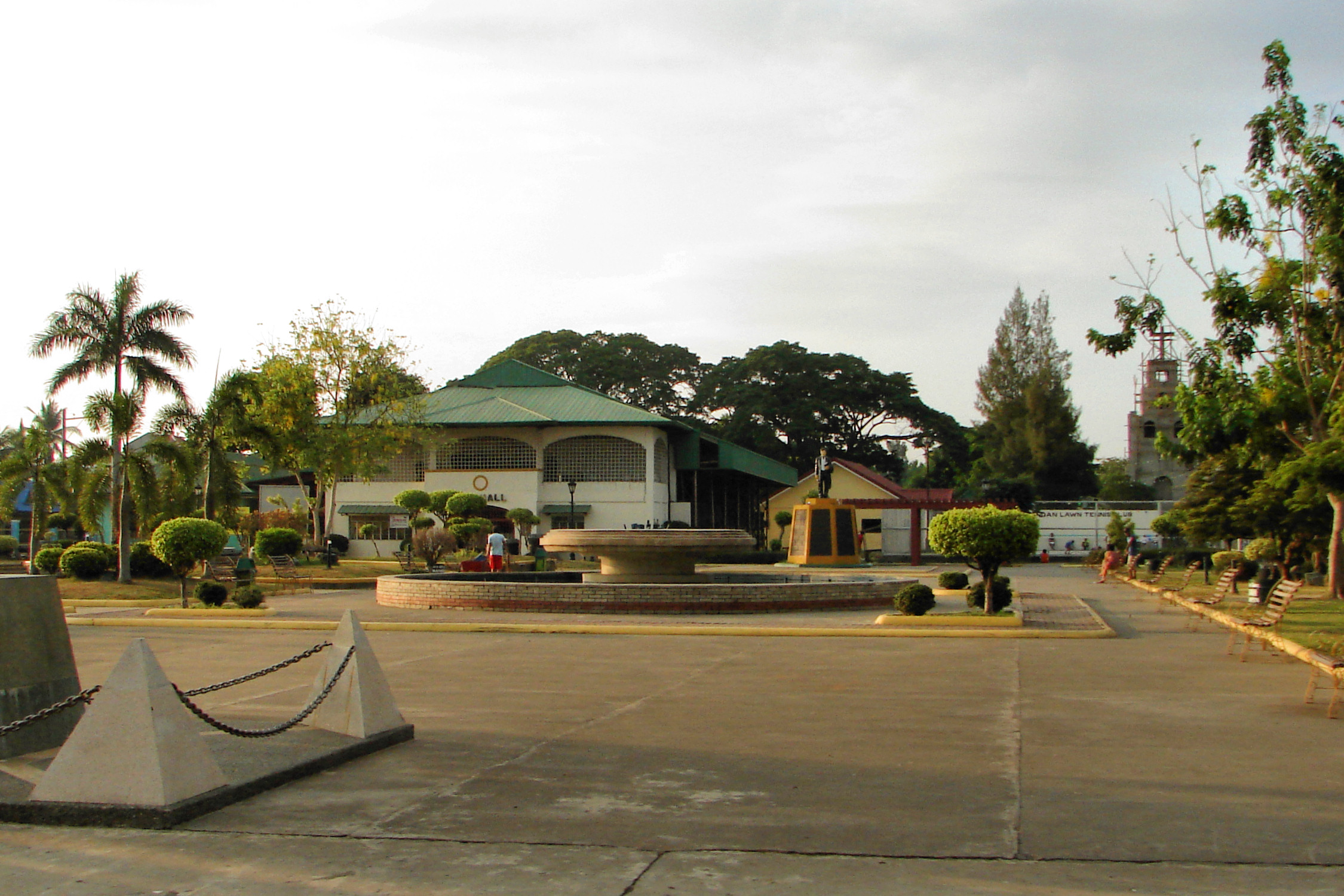
- Poblacion and Municipal Hall

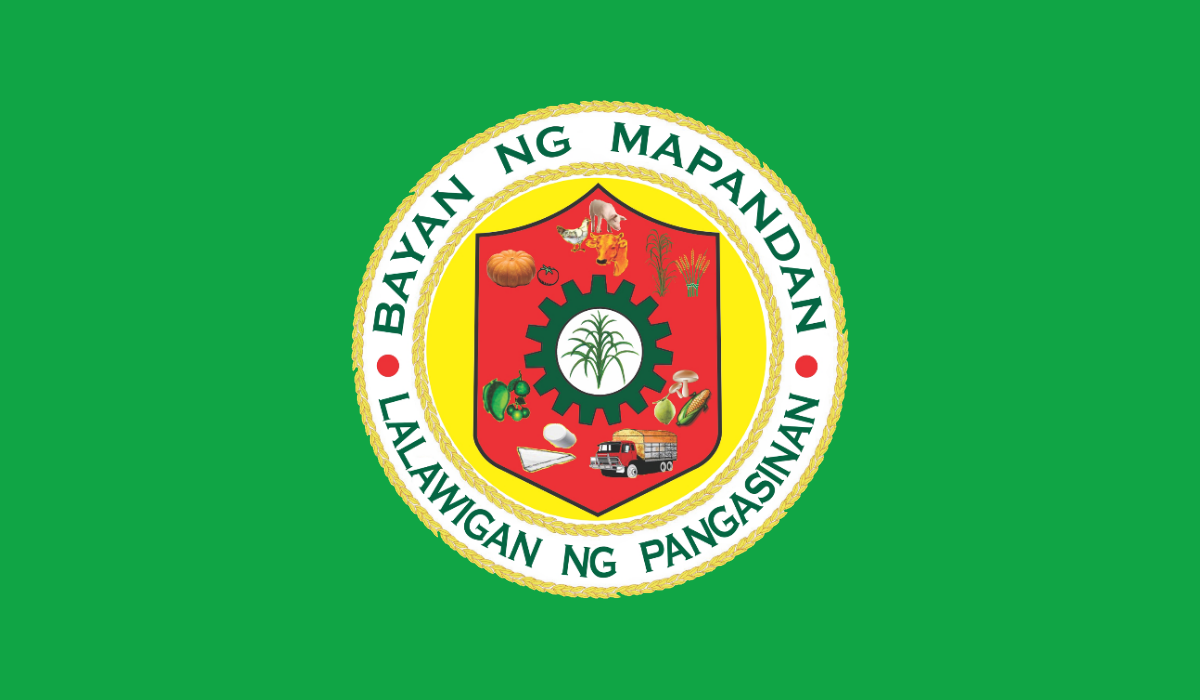
- Flag Seal
- Etymology: Pandan
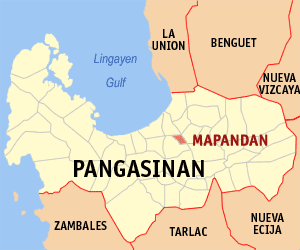
- Map of Pangasinan with Mapandan highlighted
- Interactive map of Mapandan
- Location within the Philippines
- Coordinates: 16°01′34″N 120°27′14″E
- Country: Philippines
- Region: Ilocos Region
- Province: Pangasinan
- District: 3rd district
- Founded: January 21, 1902
- Annexation to Mangaldan: October 8, 1903
- Chartered: 1908
- Barangays: 15 (see Barangays)

Government
  - Type: Sangguniang Bayan
  - Mayor: Karl Christian F. Vega
  - Vice Mayor: Gerald Glenn L. Tambaoan
  - Representative: Maria Rachel J. Arenas
  - Municipal Council: Members: Melvin Jerold Ranas; Hilario Larry Morales; Blando Quinto; Freddie Penuliar; Alicia Mariano; Pak Eric Parayno; Valentin Revilla; Gem Castro
  - Electorate: 27,556 voters (2025)

Area
  - Total: 30.00 km^{2} (11.58 sq mi)
- Elevation: 38 m (125 ft)
- Highest elevation: 61 m (200 ft)
- Lowest elevation: 4 m (13 ft)

Population (2024 census)
  - Total: 38,228
  - Density: 1,274/km^{2} (3,300/sq mi)
  - Households: 9,326

Economy
  - Income class: 3rd municipal income class
  - Poverty incidence: 9.53% (2023)
  - Revenue: ₱ 173.8 million (2024)
  - Assets: ₱ 555.4 million (2024)
  - Expenditure: ₱ 183.6 million (2024)
  - Liabilities: ₱ 110.7 million (2024)

Service provider
  - Electricity: Pangasinan 3 Electric Cooperative (PANELCO 3)
- Time zone: UTC+8 (PST)
- ZIP code: 2429
- PSGC: 0105528000
- IDD : area code: +63 (0)75
- Native languages: Pangasinan; Ilocano; Tagalog

Mapandan, officially the Municipality of Mapandan (Pangasinan: Baley na Mapandan; Ilocano: Ili ti Mapandan; Tagalog: Bayan ng Mapandan), is a municipality in the province of Pangasinan, Philippines. According to the 2024 census, it has a population of 38,228 people.

The town is known for its yearly Pandan Festival.

== Etymology ==
Mapandan (meaning plenty of pandan) got its name from “pandan”, a native palm which grew in abundance in the place at that time. The leaves of the pandan add aroma to the cooked rice if cooked with it. The leaves are also stripped and woven into mats.

== History ==
Mapandan was a former mere barrio part of Municipality of Mangaldan. It was also once called “balon baley” which means new town in the local vernacular.

Mapandan was first established as a “pueblo” by virtue of Direction General No. 39 Administration Civil No. 169-C signed by Governor General Emilio Bravo on December 28, 1887. The town originally comprised the southernmost barrios of the town of Mangaldan namely: Payapay, Baloling, Apaya, and Amanoaoac

The idea of organizing a separate town from its mother town Mangaldan was first conceived by some ten (10) local leaders in the persons of Antonio Morales, Sabino Prado, Andres Bongato, Ambrosio Calimlim, Valeriano Tamondong, Tomas Aquino, Fulgencio Nato, Filomeno Sarmiento, Jose Lalas and Florencio Datuin. It later came into fruition when Philippine Commission Act No. 332 was enacted on January 21, 1902, excising barrios Mapandan, Amanwawak, Apaya, Balolin, Luyan, and Nilimbot from Mangaldan to form the new municipality.

The town was first centered in present-day barangay Torres. Due to its remoteness, the same was transferred to its present location, which was formerly a sitio of Apaya. The lands in the present location of the Poblacion were predominantly owned by the illustrious Aquino clan. It was Leon Hilario Aquino who encouraged the people to flock to the place by subdividing the land of the Poblacion into a lot of uniform sixes and offering these for three to each family head.

Mapandan was temporarily returned to its mother town Mangaldan on October 8, 1903, by virtue of Act No. 931. In 1905, an the outbreak of an epidemic greatly depleted its population and finances. In 1908, Mapandan was again reorganized and officially re-established as a town.

This community is located alongside the nearby municipalities of Manaoag, Mangaldan, San Jacinto, and Santa Barbara.

In year 2002, Mapandan was elevated as a third (3rd) class municipality through the efforts and leadership of Hon. Jose Ferdinand Z. Calimlim Jr., who spearheaded strategies on income and revenue generation.

Mapandan is a Hall of Famer for having the Pangasinan's cleanest, safest and greenest municipality (Category B). Mapandan was also awarded the Pangasinan's Healthiest Municipality for having the fewest malnourished children.

== Geography ==
Mapandan is located in rastern-ventral part of Pangasinan. Bordered by Mangaldan to the north, Manaoag to the east, and Santa Barbara to the west and southern part. It is landlocked, however, it is not too far from nearby coastal areas of Dagupan, Binmaley and Mangaldan. Mapandan is a central hilly area, having several mountains nearby.

Mapandan is situated 29 kilometers (18 mi) from the provincial capital Lingayen, and 205.42 kilometers (127.64 mi) from the country's capital city of Manila.

The Map of all Barangays in Mapandan, Pangasinan

=== Barangays ===
Mapandan is politically subdivided into 15 barangays. Each barangay consists of puroks and some have sitios.

- Amanoaoac
- Apaya
- Aserda
- Baloling
- Coral
- Golden
- Jimenez
- Lambayan
- Luyan
- Nilombot
- Pias
- Poblacion
- Primicias
- Santa Maria
- Torres

=== Climate ===
Climate data for Mapandan, Pangasinan
Month	Jan	Feb	Mar	Apr	May	Jun	Jul	Aug	Sep	Oct	Nov	Dec	Year
Mean daily maximum °C (°F)	29 (84)	29 (84)	30 (86)	32 (90)	33 (91)	33 (91)	33 (91)	33 (91)	33 (91)	32 (90)	31 (88)	29 (84)	31 (88)
Mean daily minimum °C (°F)	21 (70)	21 (70)	22 (72)	23 (73)	24 (75)	24 (75)	23 (73)	24 (75)	23 (73)	23 (73)	22 (72)	21 (70)	23 (73)
Average precipitation mm (inches)	127.5 (5.02)	115.8 (4.56)	129.7 (5.11)	141.1 (5.56)	248.2 (9.77)	165 (6.5)	185.3 (7.30)	161.9 (6.37)	221.4 (8.72)	299.5 (11.79)	199 (7.8)	188.7 (7.43)	2,183.1 (85.93)
Average rainy days	17	17	17	15	20	19	19	20	21	20	17	19	221
Source: World Weather Online

== Demographics ==
Population census of Mapandan
Year	Pop.	±% p.a.
1903	4,198	—
1918	6,049	+2.47%
1939	7,286	+0.89%
1948	9,836	+3.39%
1960	13,065	+2.39%
1970	16,653	+2.45%
1975	18,143	+1.73%
1980	20,094	+2.06%
1990	25,622	+2.46%
1995	27,439	+1.29%
2000	30,775	+2.49%
2007	32,905	+0.93%
2010	34,439	+1.67%
2015	37,059	+1.41%
2020	38,058	+0.56%
2024	38,228	+0.11%
Source: Philippine Statistics Authority

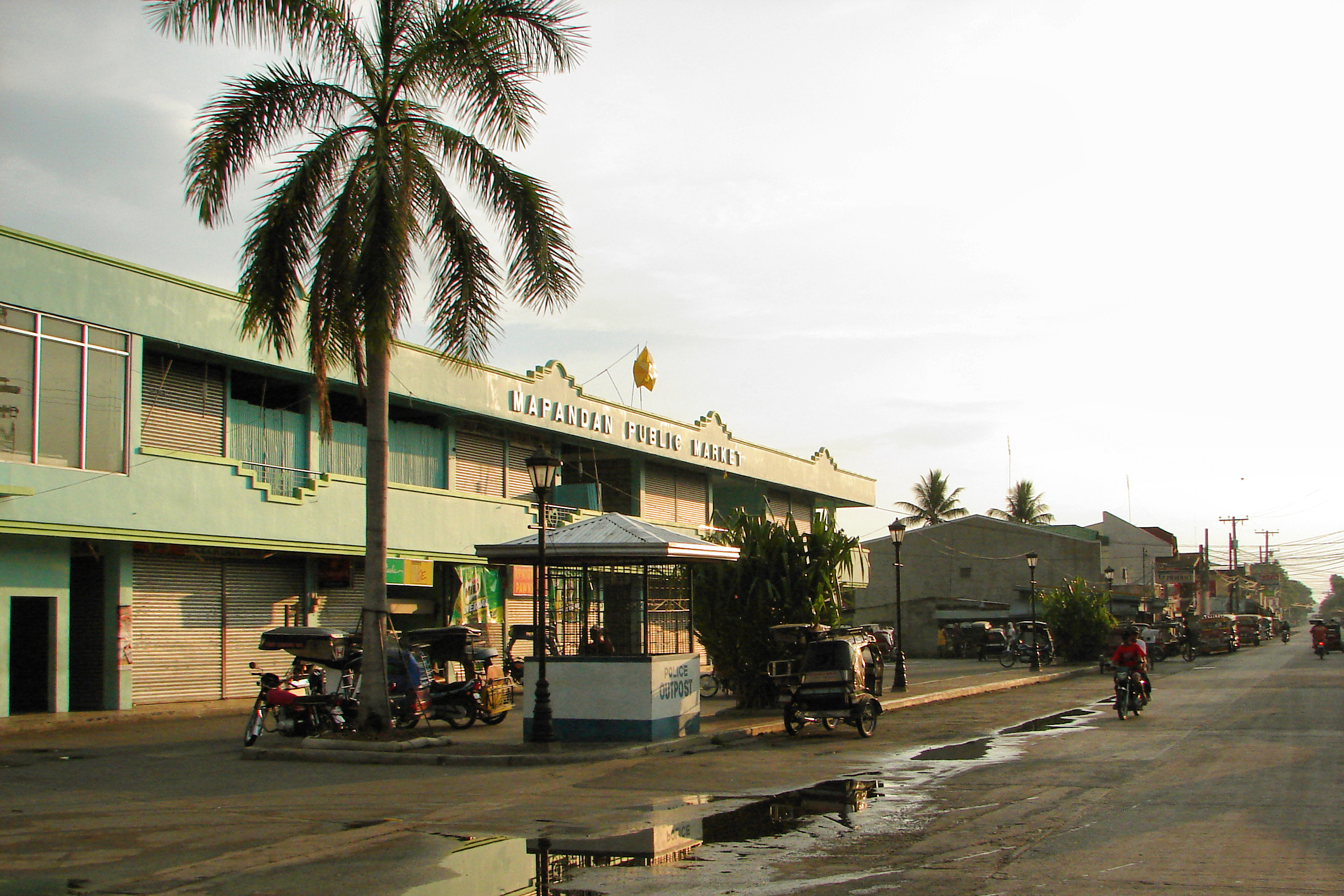
Public Market

Most populous barangay in the Population census year

Barangay	Population census of Mapandan by Barangay						
Barangay	2024	2020	2015	2010	2007	2000	1990
Amanoaoac	1,656	1,636	2,678	1,642	1,604	1,593	1,357
Apaya	1,650	1,467	1,362	1,496	1,332	1,289	994
Aserda	1,414	1,108	1,178	1,167	1,062	949	805
Baloling	4,238	4,393	3,835	3,755	3,727	3,446	2,866
Coral	1,405	1,389	1,374	1,303	1,222	1,208	912
Golden	1,432	1,399	1,425	1,370	1,314	1,214	1,040
Jimenez	2,008	1,995	1,831	1,666	1,715	1,527	1,230
Lambayan	1,682	1,756	1,616	1,560	1,477	1,641	1,434
Luyan	3,344	3,730	3,225	2,957	2,938	2,432	2,061
Nilombot	4,199	4,411	4,215	4,075	4,837	3,574	2,765
Pias	4,827	4,699	4,619	4,297	2,813	3,463	2,755
Poblacion	3,509	3,622	3,714	3,360	3,388	3,416	3,173
Primicias	2,218	2,071	1,904	1,818	1,819	1,683	1,411
Santa Maria	1,585	1,270	1,305	1,175	1,249	1,037	911
Torres	3,061	3,112	2,778	2,798	2,408	2,303	1,908
Total	38,228	38,058	37,059	34,439	32,905	30,775	25,622

=== Languages ===
Pangasinan and Ilocano are the two main spoken languages in Mapandan. Tagalog is also widely spoken in the town.

=== Ethnic Groups ===
Ethnic Pangasinenses make up more than 90% of Mapandan's Population followed by Ethnic Ilocanos and Tagalogs. Notably, Barangay Santa Maria houses a significant % of Ethnic Ilocanos relative to the % of Mapandan's ethnic groups.

Barangay	Ethnic census of Mapandan (by Barangay) (2020)			
Barangay	Pangasinense	Others	Ilocano	Tagalog
Amanoaoac	1,621	11	-	4
Apaya	1,451	-	2	14
Aserda	1,065	10	2	31
Baloling	4,145	110	48	90
Coral	1,237	68	54	30
Golden	1,242	82	37	38
Jimenez	1,916	46	10	23
Lambayan	1,665	63	19	9
Luyan	3,400	213	71	46
Nilombot	4,154	121	67	69
Pias	4,171	184	171	173
Poblacion	3,431	106	42	43
Primicias	1,800	84	108	57
Santa Maria	699	81	427	63
Torres	2,724	233	92	59
Total	34,721	1,412	1,150	749

=== Religions ===
Major religions are in the town, with different branches of churches within.

- Seventh-day Adventist Church (Poblacion and Kolos-Pias)
- Iglesia ni Cristo (Nilombot and Luyan)
- The Grand Mosque (Luyan)
- The Church of Jesus Christ of Latter Day Saints (Nilombot)
- Kingdom hall of Jehovas Witnesses (Coral)
- Roman Catholicism (Poblacion and Luyan)
- Good news to the Nations Outreach (Poblacion)
- Born Again Christianity (Poblacion)
- God With Us Church(Aserda)
- Come to Jesus Fellowship International (Luyan)

Roman Catholicism is the major Religion in Mapandan, which falls under the jurisdiction of the Roman Catholic Archdiocese of Lingayen-Dagupan, and it is annexed by different religions around.

Barangay	Religious census of Mapandan (by Barangay) (2020)								
Barangay	Roman Catholic	Protestant	INC	Other	JW	LDS	Islam	IFI	None
Amanoaoac	1,495	88	21	32	-	-	-	-	-
Apaya	1,359	81	18	-	4	5	-	-	-
Aserda	957	113	30	8	-	-	-	-	-
Baloling	3,868	66	380	56	7	13	3	-	-
Coral	1,264	80	32	6	7	-	-	-	-
Golden	1,352	35	5	6	-	-	1	-	-
Jimenez	1,865	31	89	-	4	3	-	3	-
Lambayan	1,664	76	5	3	-	6	-	2	-
Luyan	3,262	173	128	107	34	8	18	-	-
Nilombot	4,164	197	16	1	11	10	4	3	5
Pias	4,356	249	45	30	13	5	-	1	-
Poblacion	3,346	129	105	11	7	5	18	1	-
Primicias	1,978	10	57	4	-	-	-	-	-
Santa Maria	1,162	64	23	18	1	-	-	1	1
Torres	2,970	39	60	3	10	19	5	2	-
Total	35,062	1,431	1,014	285	98	74	49	13	6

== Economy ==
Poverty incidence of Mapandan (%)

Source: Philippine Statistics Authority

Mapandan is practically rural in terms of its area. It is composed of farming areas and cattle ranch farms. It has a little part of Bued river in northern part and an irrigation project also known as Payas irrigation project, which aims for a standard irrigation for farming areas in the municipality.

== Government ==
=== Local government ===
Mapandan is part of the third congressional district of the province of Pangasinan. It is governed by a mayor, designated as its local chief executive, and by a municipal council as its legislative body in accordance with the Local Government Code. The mayor, vice mayor, and the councilors are elected directly by the people through an election which is being held every three years.

== Education ==
The Mapandan Schools District Office governs all educational institutions within the municipality. It oversees the management and operations of all private and public elementary and high schools.

Map of all schools in Mapandan.

=== Primary and elementary schools ===
- Academia Praestantia
- Amanoaoac Elementary School
- Baloling Elementary School
- Central Pangasinan Adventist School
- Discovery Land Learning School
- Golden Elementary School
- Goodnews Educational Institute
- Jimenez Elementary School
- Lambayan Elementary School
- Luyan Elementary School
- Mapandan Academy
- Mapandan Catholic School
- Mapandan Central School SPED Center
- Nilombot Elementary School
- Pias Elementary School
- Primicias Elementary School
- Sta. Maria Elementary School
- Torres Elementary School
- Wendy's Academy

=== Secondary schools ===
- Baloling National High School
- Mapandan National High School
- Primicias National High School
- Torres National High School

== Sister cities ==
These are cities Mapandan are associated with:

- Hong Kong, China
- Ontario, Canada
