= Manaoag =

Municipality in Pangasinan, Philippines

- Municipality
- Municipality of Manaoag
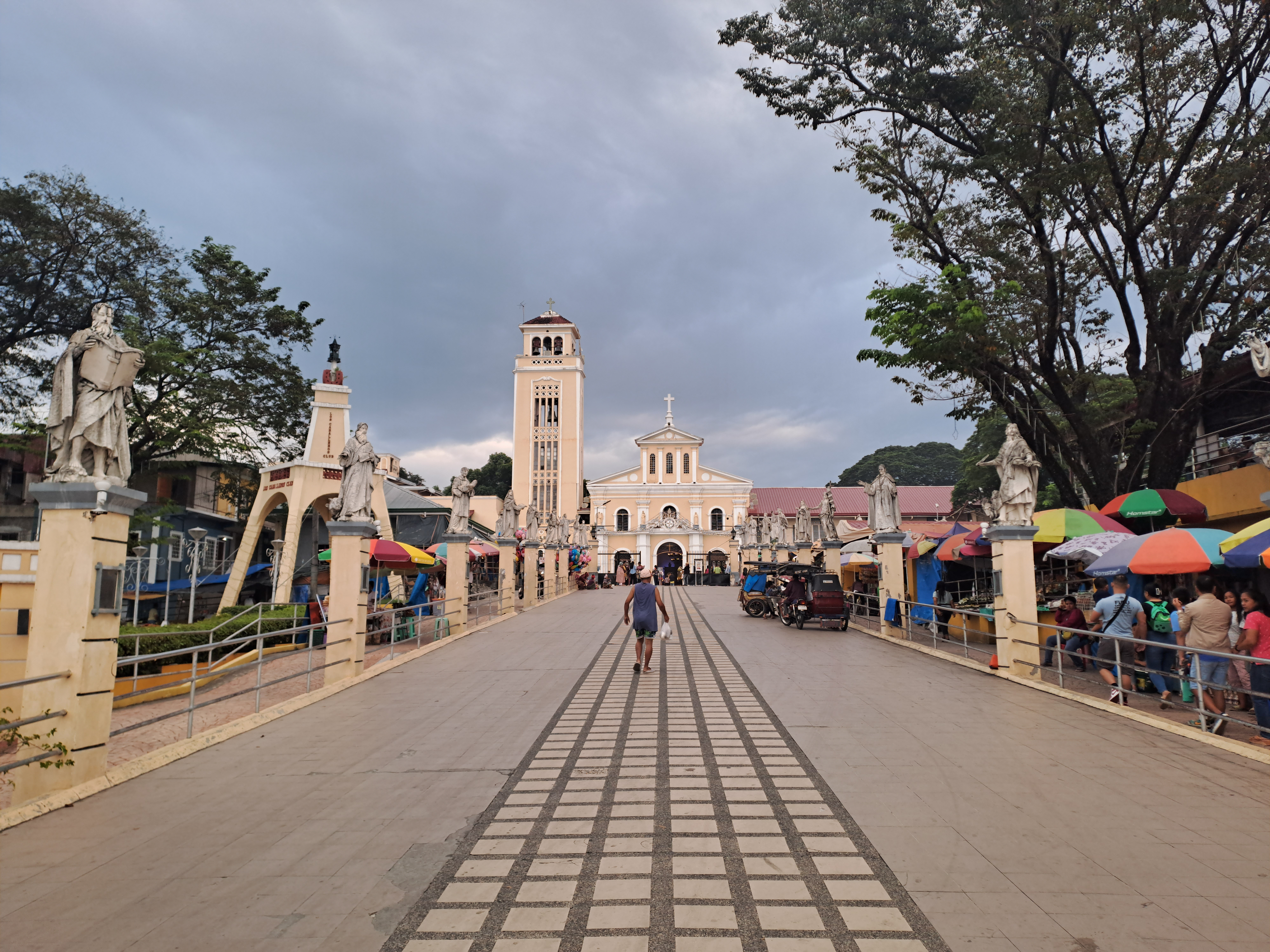
- Minor Basilica of Our Lady of Manaoag

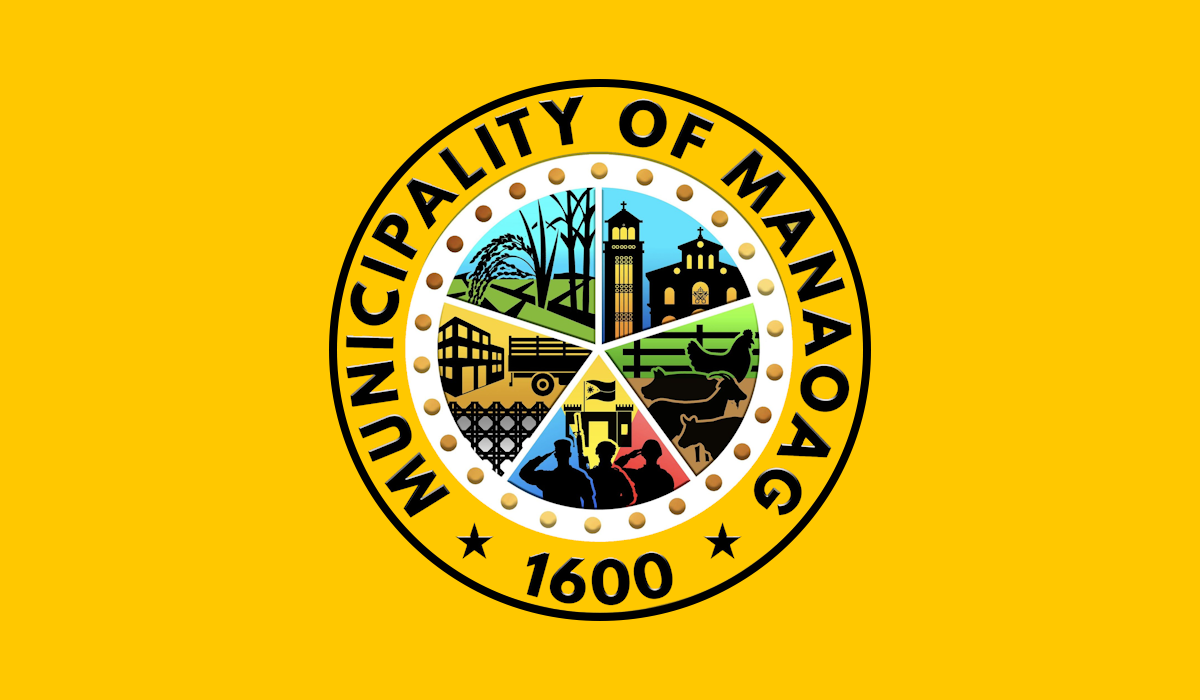
- Flag Seal
- Nickname: Pilgrimage town
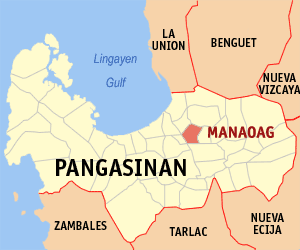
- Map of Pangasinan with Manaoag highlighted
- Interactive map of Manaoag
- Location within the Philippines
- Coordinates: 16°02′38″N 120°29′08″E
- Country: Philippines
- Region: Ilocos Region
- Province: Pangasinan
- District: 4th district
- Founded: October 7, 1600
- Barangays: 26 (see Barangays)

Government
  - Type: Sangguniang Bayan
  - Mayor: Jeremy Agerico B. Rosario (Lakas)
  - Vice Mayor: Domyciano Z. Ching (NP)
  - Representative: Gina de Venecia (Lakas)
  - Municipal Council: Members: Marian Dominica A. Ching (IND); Perc Jomini D. Villacorta (IND); Jon Edmund Augustus D. Amador (IND); Merlinda M. Tantay (Lakas); Anna Lyn Arenas-Blanco (NP); Rosalino S. De Vera (Lakas); Winston L. Chu Tan (Lakas); Arnold L. Saragoza (Lakas)
  - Electorate: 49,728 voters (2025)

Area
  - Total: 55.95 km^{2} (21.60 sq mi)
- Elevation: 22 m (72 ft)
- Highest elevation: 64 m (210 ft)
- Lowest elevation: 6 m (20 ft)

Population (2024 census)
  - Total: 76,606
  - Density: 1,369/km^{2} (3,546/sq mi)
  - Households: 17,659

Economy
  - Income class: 1st municipal income class
  - Poverty incidence: 12.47% (2023)
  - Revenue: ₱ 316.8 million (2024)
  - Assets: ₱ 742.8 million (2024)
  - Expenditure: ₱ 300.9 million (2024)
  - Liabilities: ₱ 130.3 million (2024)

Service provider
  - Electricity: Dagupan Electric Corporation (DECORP)
- Time zone: UTC+8 (PST)
- ZIP code: 2430
- PSGC: 0105525000
- IDD : area code: +63 (0)75
- Native languages: Pangasinan; Ilocano; Tagalog
- Website: www.manaoag.gov.ph

Manaoag, officially the Municipality of Manaoag ([mɐˈnaʊag]; Pangasinan: Baley na Manaoag; Ilocano: Ili ti Manaoag; Tagalog: Bayan ng Manaoag), is a municipality in the province of Pangasinan, Philippines. According to the 2024 census, it has a population of 76,606 people.

== Etymology ==
Manaoag came from the Pangasinan word "Mantaoag" which means "to call".

== History ==
Manaoag as a settlement was used to be part of present-day San Jacinto in the early 1600s. Later, the Augustinians established a mission as Mission of Sta. Monica, while Dominicans also served the area.

On October 8, 1903, Manaoag absorbed the municipality of San Jacinto within its jurisdiction by virtue of Philippine Commission Act No. 931. San Jacinto was later separated as a re-established municipality on October 31, 1906.

In 1972, Republic Act No. 6485 was enacted wherein twenty barrios were organized as a separate municipality and the province's newest, named Laoac; however, it took long before the establishment was formalized in 1980.

== Geography ==
The Municipality of Manaoag is bordered by Pozorrubio in the north, Urdaneta City and Mapandan in the south, Laoac in the east, and San Jacinto in the west.

Manaoag is situated 34.19 kilometres (21.24 mi) from the provincial capital Lingayen, and 200.66 kilometres (124.68 mi) from the country's capital city of Manila.

=== Barangays ===
Manaoag is politically subdivided into 26 barangays. Each barangay consists of puroks and some have sitios.

- Babasit
- Baguinay
- Baritao
- Bisal
- Bucao
- Cabanbanan
- Calaocan
- Inamotan
- Lelemaan
- Licsi
- Lipit Norte
- Lipit Sur
- Matulong
- Mermer
- Nalsian
- Oraan East
- Oraan West
- Pantal
- Pao
- Parian
- Poblacion
- Pugaro
- San Ramon
- Santa Ines
- Sapang
- Tebuel

=== Climate ===
Climate data for Manaoag, Pangasinan
Month	Jan	Feb	Mar	Apr	May	Jun	Jul	Aug	Sep	Oct	Nov	Dec	Year
Mean daily maximum °C (°F)	29 (84)	29 (84)	30 (86)	32 (90)	33 (91)	33 (91)	33 (91)	33 (91)	33 (91)	32 (90)	31 (88)	29 (84)	31 (88)
Mean daily minimum °C (°F)	21 (70)	21 (70)	22 (72)	23 (73)	24 (75)	24 (75)	24 (75)	24 (75)	23 (73)	23 (73)	22 (72)	21 (70)	23 (73)
Average precipitation mm (inches)	127.5 (5.02)	115.8 (4.56)	129.7 (5.11)	141.1 (5.56)	248.2 (9.77)	165 (6.5)	185.3 (7.30)	161.9 (6.37)	221.4 (8.72)	299.5 (11.79)	199 (7.8)	188.7 (7.43)	2,183.1 (85.93)
Average rainy days	17	17	17	15	20	19	19	20	21	20	17	19	221
Source: World Weather Online

== Demographics ==
Population census of Manaoag
Year	Pop.	±% p.a.
1903	16,793	—
1918	22,279	+1.90%
1939	29,030	+1.27%
1948	34,304	+1.87%
1960	41,164	+1.53%
1970	48,091	+1.57%
1975	48,450	+0.15%
1980	36,742	−5.38%
1990	45,339	+2.13%
1995	49,705	+1.74%
2000	54,743	+2.09%
2007	62,684	+1.89%
2010	64,578	+1.09%
2015	69,497	+1.41%
2020	76,045	+1.91%
2024	76,606	+0.18%
Source: Philippine Statistics Authority

=== Languages ===
Pangasinan is the primary dialect of Manaoag. Ilocano is also spoken and understood by the population.

== Economy ==
Poverty incidence of Manaoag (%)

Source: Philippine Statistics Authority

== Government ==
=== Local government ===
Manaoag is part of the fourth congressional district of the province of Pangasinan. It is governed by a mayor, designated as its local chief executive, and by a municipal council as its legislative body in accordance with the Local Government Code. The mayor, vice mayor, and the councilors are elected directly by the people through an election which is being held every three years.

=== Elected officials ===
Members of the Manaoag Municipal Government (2025-2028)
Position	Name
Representative	Gina de Venecia (Lakas)
Municipal Mayor	Jeremy Agerico B. Rosario (Lakas)
Municipal Vice-Mayor	Domyciano Z. Ching (NP)
Municipal Councilors	Marian Dominica A. Ching (IND)
Municipal Councilors	Perc Jomini D. Villacorta (IND)
Municipal Councilors	Jon Edmund Augustus D. Amador (IND)
Municipal Councilors	Merlinda M. Tantay (Lakas)
Municipal Councilors	Anna Lyn Arenas-Blanco (NP)
Municipal Councilors	Rosalino S. De Vera (Lakas)
Municipal Councilors	Winston L. Chu Tan (Lakas)
Municipal Councilors	Arnold L. Saragoza (Lakas)

== Culture ==
=== Our Lady of Manaoag ===
The town is a popular local pilgrimage site as it enshrines a 17th-century ivory statue of St Mary under the title of Nuestra Señora del Rosario de Manaoag ("Our Lady of the Rosary of Manaoag"). Legend has it that an unnamed man had a vision of the Blessed Virgin Mary, who told him to have the shrine built. Famous souvenirs include candles, rosaries, and ampullae of blessed oil with flowers (which supposedly has healing properties), as well as less religious ones such as bagoóng monamon and tupig.

=== List of Cultural Properties of Manaoag ===
Cultural Property wmph identifier (Note: wmph is an internal identifier used by Wikimedia Philippines to identify the monument. This is not an official identifier, and only shown temporarily in the templates until the government creates an updated complete list.)	Site name	Description	Province	City or municipality	Address	Coordinates	Image
	Minor Basilica of Our Lady of the Rosary of Manaoag	first chapel built in 1600s; rebuilt during World War II	Pangasinan	Manaoag, Pangasinan		16°02′39″N 120°29′20″E	Upload file
	Our Lady of Manaoag College	formerly an old convent beside Manaoag Church	Pangasinan	Manaoag, Pangasinan		16°02′35″N 120°29′22″E	Upload Photo
	Manaoag Town Hall	where the Municipal Government of Manaoag is located	Pangasinan	Manaoag, Pangasinan		16°02′37″N 120°29′14″E	Upload file
	Veterans Freedom Hall		Pangasinan	Manaoag, Pangasinan		16°02′37″N 120°29′14″E	Upload file
	Llamido House	Constructed in 1960's	Pangasinan	Manaoag, Pangasinan	351 N. Garcia Road (Guico Street)	16°02′34″N 120°29′16″E	Upload file
	Lazaro Corpuz House	Constructed in 1935	Pangasinan	Manaoag, Pangasinan	N. Garcia Road (Guico Street)	16°02′33″N 120°29′18″E	Upload file
	Macario Corpuz House	Constructed in 1920s	Pangasinan	Manaoag, Pangasinan	285 N. Garcia Road (Guico Street)	16°02′32″N 120°29′18″E	Upload file
	Filomena House	Constructed in 1950s	Pangasinan	Manaoag, Pangasinan	281 N. Garcia Road (Guico Street)	16°02′33″N 120°29′19″E	Upload file
	Tanguilig House	Constructed in 1920s	Pangasinan	Manaoag, Pangasinan	240 N. Garcia Road (Guico Street)	16°02′31″N 120°29′19″E	Upload file
	Dionisio Guico House	Constructed in 1958	Pangasinan	Manaoag, Pangasinan	272 N. Garcia Road (Guico Street)	16°02′31″N 120°29′20″E	Upload file
	Mendoza House	Constructed in 1930s	Pangasinan	Manaoag, Pangasinan	279 N. Garcia Road (Guico Street)	16°02′32″N 120°29′19″E	Upload file
	Felipe Guico House	Constructed in 1940s	Pangasinan	Manaoag, Pangasinan	270 N. Garcia Road (Guico Street)	16°02′32″N 120°29′20″E	Upload file
	Berceles House	Constructed in 1960s	Pangasinan	Manaoag, Pangasinan	271 N. Garcia Road (Guico Street)	16°02′31″N 120°29′19″E	Upload file
	Bautista House	Constructed in 1930s	Pangasinan	Manaoag, Pangasinan	Guico Street	16°02′29″N 120°29′20″E	Upload file

== Education ==
The Manaoag Schools District Office governs all educational institutions within the municipality. It oversees the management and operations of all private and public elementary and high schools.

=== Primary and elementary schools ===
- Babasit Elementary School
- Baguinay Elementary School
- Baritao Elementary School
- Bisal-Bucao Elementary School
- Cabanbanan Elementary School
- Doña Consolacion Sta. Maria Elementary School
- Doña Consuelo S. Perez Elementary School
- Inamotan Elementary School
- Lelemaan Elementary School
- Lipit Elementary School
- Manaoag Central School SPED Center
- Ma-Tulong Elementary School
- Nalsian Elementary School
- Oraan Elementary School
- Pao Elementary School
- Pio Generosa Elementary School
- San Ramon-Mermer Elementary School

=== Secondary schools ===
- Baguinay National High School
- Cabanbanan National High School
- Lipit National High School
- Manaoag National High School

== Gallery ==
Manaoag Town Hall (Poblacion)

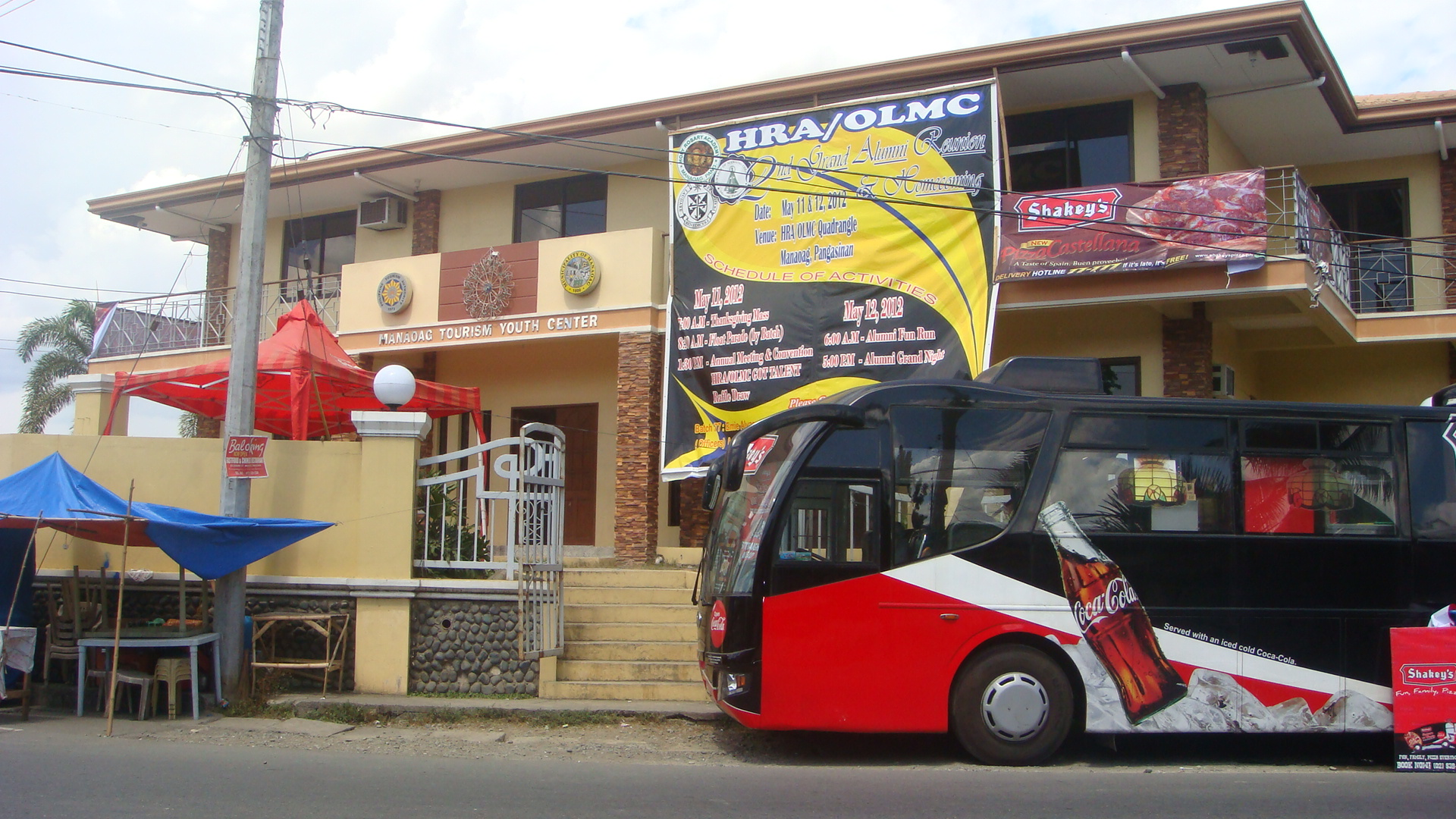
Manaoag Tourism Youth Center

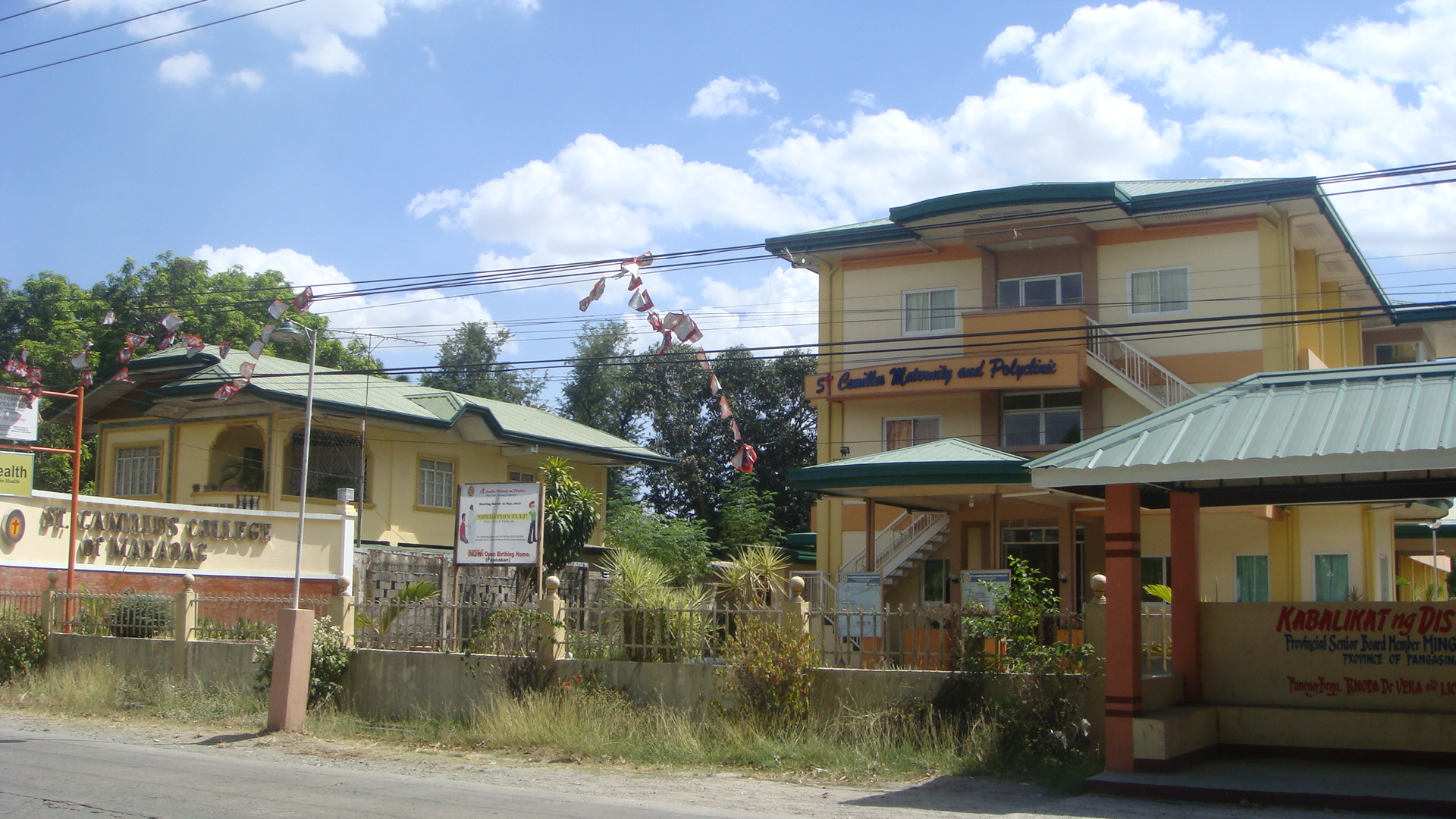
St. Camillus College of Manaoag and Maternity & Polyclinic

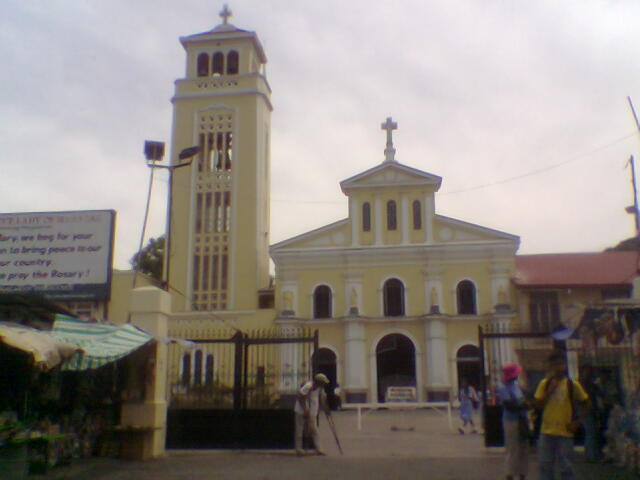
Basilica of Our Lady of the Holy Rosary of Manaoag

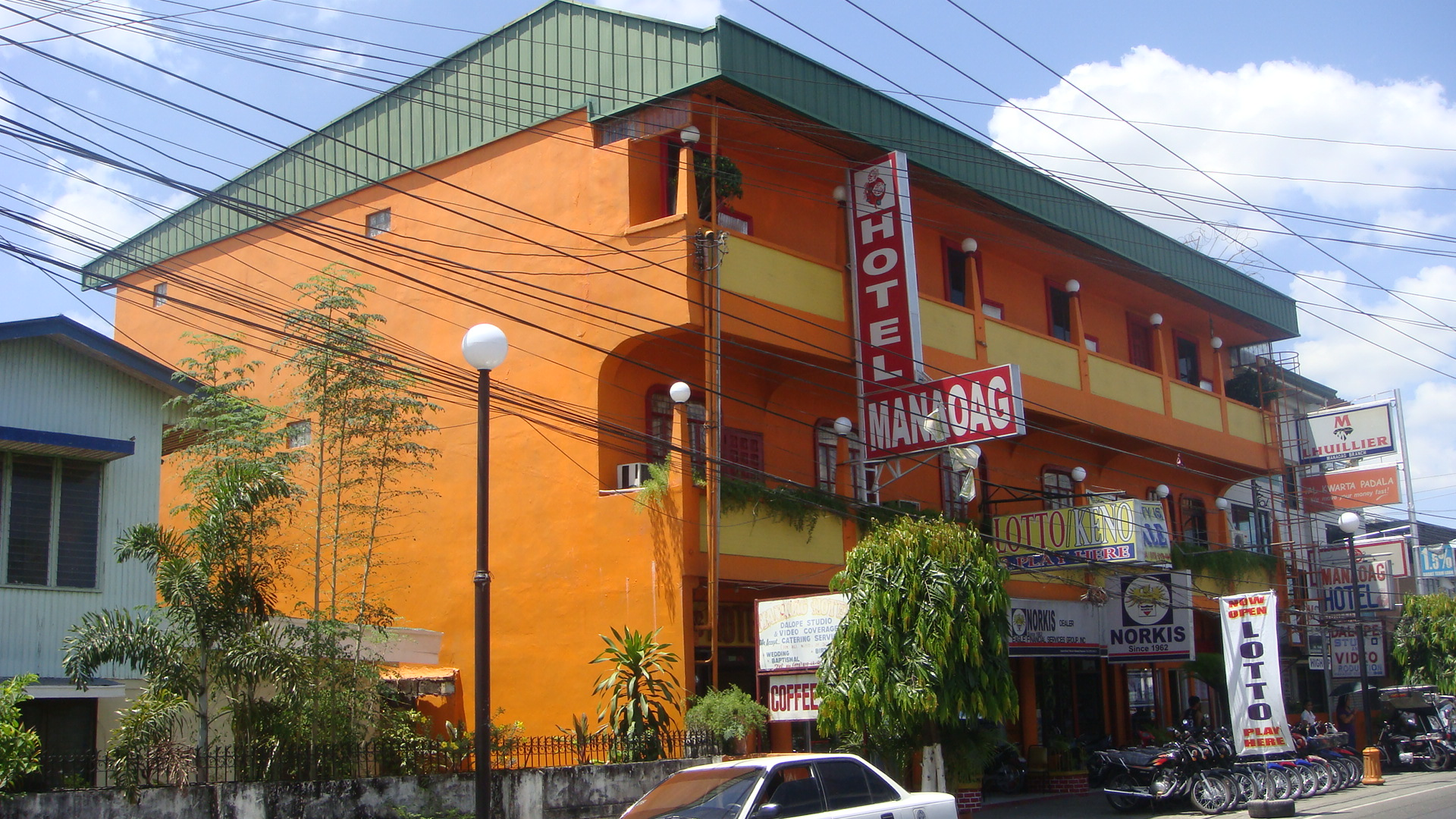
Hotel Manaoag (Soriano Street

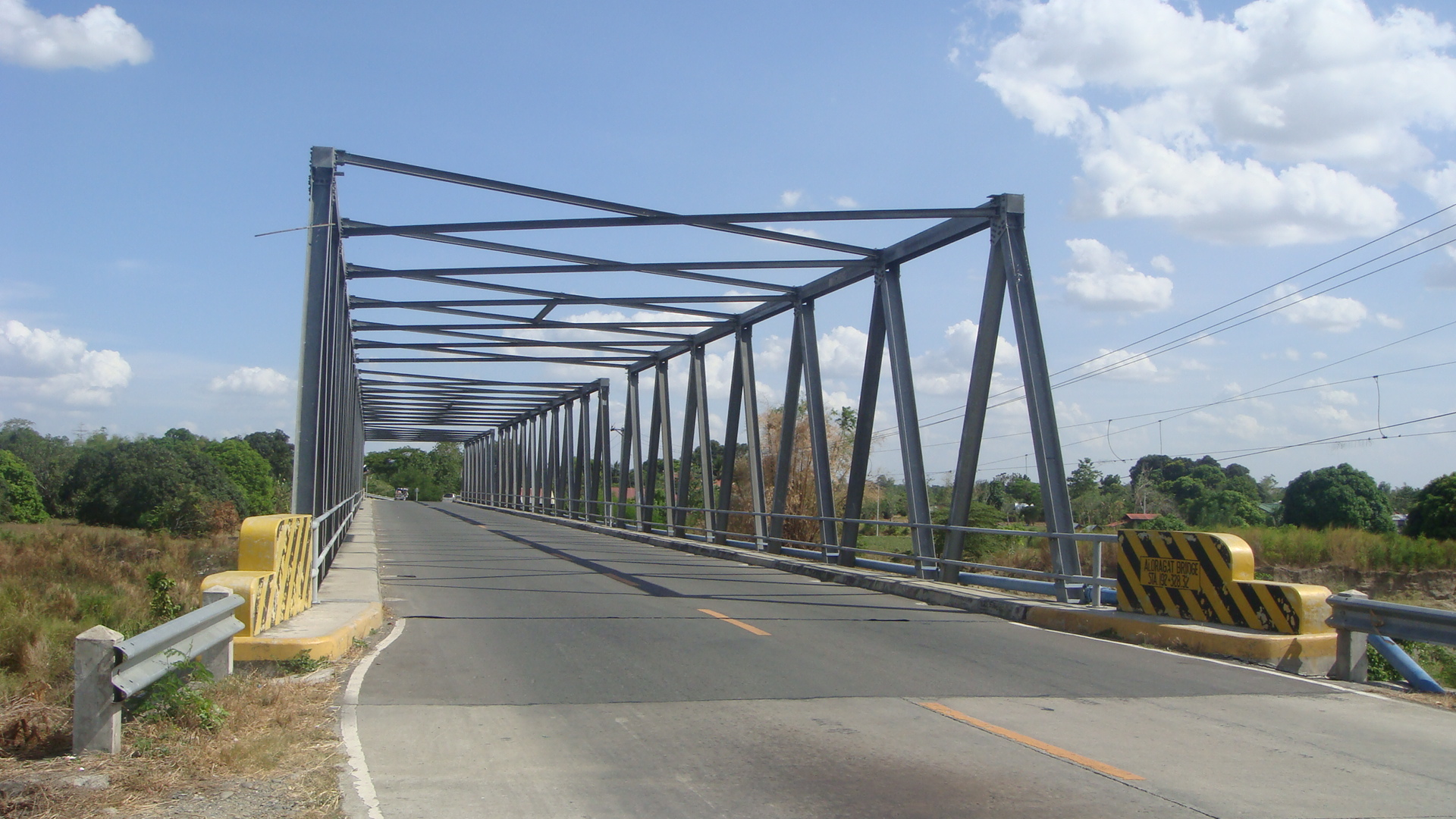
Aloragat bridge and Aloragat River
