= Pangasinan's 4th congressional district =

Legislative district of the Philippines

- Constituency for the House of Representatives of the Philippines
- Boundary of Pangasinan's 4th congressional district in Pangasinan

- Location of Pangasinan within the Philippines
- Province: Pangasinan
- Region: Ilocos Region
- Population: 495,311 (2020)
- Electorate: 340,564 (2022)
- Major settlements: 5 LGUs: Cities; Dagupan; Municipalities; Manaoag; Mangaldan; San Fabian; San Jacinto
- Area: 274.35 km^{2} (105.93 sq mi)

Current constituency
- Created: 1907
- Representative: Gina de Venecia
- Political party: Lakas
- Congressional bloc: Majority

Pangasinan's 4th congressional district is one of the six congressional districts of the Philippines in the province of Pangasinan. It has been represented in the House of Representatives of the Philippines since 1916 and earlier in the Philippine Assembly from 1907 to 1916. The district consists of the city of Dagupan and adjacent municipalities of Manaoag, Mangaldan, San Fabian and San Jacinto. It is currently represented in the 20th Congress by Gina de Venecia of the Lakas–CMD (Lakas).

Prior to its second dissolution in 1972, the district consisted of the central Pangasinan municipalities of Alcala, Bautista, Binalonan, Manaoag, Pozorrubio, Santo Tomas, Sison, Urdaneta, and Villasis. San Jacinto also first became part of the district from until 1935.

== Representation history ==
#	Image	Member	Term of office		Legislature	Party	Electoral history	Constituent LGUs
#	Image	Member	Start	End	Legislature	Party	Electoral history	Constituent LGUs
=== Pangasinan's 4th district for the Philippine Assembly ===
District created January 9, 1907.
1		Lorenzo Fenoy	October 16, 1907	October 16, 1909	1st	Nacionalista	Elected in 1907.	1907–1909; Alcala, Bautista, Binalonan, Manaoag, Pozorrubio, San Jacinto, Urdaneta, Villasis
2		Joaquín Balmori	October 16, 1909	October 16, 1912	2nd	Progresista	Elected in 1909.	1909–1916; Alcala, Bautista, Binalonan, Manaoag, Pozorrubio, San Jacinto, Santo Tomas, Urdaneta, Villasis
3		Pedro María Sison	October 16, 1912	October 16, 1916	3rd	Nacionalista	Elected in 1912.	1909–1916; Alcala, Bautista, Binalonan, Manaoag, Pozorrubio, San Jacinto, Santo Tomas, Urdaneta, Villasis
=== Pangasinan's 4th district for the House of Representatives of the Philippine Islands ===
4		Alejandro F. de Guzmán	October 16, 1916	June 3, 1919	4th	Nacionalista	Elected in 1916.	1916–1935; Alcala, Bautista, Binalonan, Manaoag, Pozorrubio, San Jacinto, Santo Tomas, Urdaneta, Villasis
5		Alejandro R. Mendoza	June 3, 1919	June 6, 1922	5th	Nacionalista	Elected in 1919.	1916–1935; Alcala, Bautista, Binalonan, Manaoag, Pozorrubio, San Jacinto, Santo Tomas, Urdaneta, Villasis
6		Eusebio V. Sison	June 6, 1922	June 5, 1934	6th	Nacionalista; Colectivista	Elected in 1922.	1916–1935; Alcala, Bautista, Binalonan, Manaoag, Pozorrubio, San Jacinto, Santo Tomas, Urdaneta, Villasis
6		Eusebio V. Sison	June 6, 1922	June 5, 1934	7th	Nacionalista; Consolidado	Re-elected in 1925.	1916–1935; Alcala, Bautista, Binalonan, Manaoag, Pozorrubio, San Jacinto, Santo Tomas, Urdaneta, Villasis
6		Eusebio V. Sison	June 6, 1922	June 5, 1934	8th	Nacionalista; Consolidado	Re-elected in 1928.	1916–1935; Alcala, Bautista, Binalonan, Manaoag, Pozorrubio, San Jacinto, Santo Tomas, Urdaneta, Villasis
6		Eusebio V. Sison	June 6, 1922	June 5, 1934	9th	Nacionalista; Consolidado	Re-elected in 1931.	1916–1935; Alcala, Bautista, Binalonan, Manaoag, Pozorrubio, San Jacinto, Santo Tomas, Urdaneta, Villasis
7		Cipriano Primicias Sr.	June 5, 1934	September 16, 1935	10th	Nacionalista; Demócrata Pro-Independencia	Elected in 1934.	1916–1935; Alcala, Bautista, Binalonan, Manaoag, Pozorrubio, San Jacinto, Santo Tomas, Urdaneta, Villasis
#	Image	Member	Term of office		National Assembly	Party	Electoral history	Constituent LGUs
#	Image	Member	Start	End	National Assembly	Party	Electoral history	Constituent LGUs
=== Pangasinan's 4th district for the National Assembly (Commonwealth of the Philippines) ===
8		Nicomedes T. Rupisan	September 16, 1935	December 30, 1941	1st	Nacionalista; Democrático	Elected in 1935.	1935–1941; Alcala, Bautista, Binalonan, Manaoag, Pozorrubio, Santo Tomas, Sison, Urdaneta, Villasis
8		Nicomedes T. Rupisan	September 16, 1935	December 30, 1941	2nd	Nacionalista	Re-elected in 1938.	1935–1941; Alcala, Bautista, Binalonan, Manaoag, Pozorrubio, Santo Tomas, Sison, Urdaneta, Villasis
District dissolved into the two-seat Pangasinan's at-large district for the National Assembly (Second Philippine Republic).
#	Image	Member	Term of office		Common wealth Congress	Party	Electoral history	Constituent LGUs
#	Image	Member	Start	End	Common wealth Congress	Party	Electoral history	Constituent LGUs
=== Pangasinan's 4th district for the House of Representatives of the Commonwealth of the Philippines ===
District re-created May 24, 1945.
(7)		Cipriano Primicias Sr.	June 11, 1945	May 25, 1946	1st	Nacionalista	Elected in 1941.	1945–1946; Alcala, Bautista, Binalonan, Manaoag, Pozorrubio, Santo Tomas, Sison, Urdaneta, Villasis
#	Image	Member	Term of office		Congress	Party	Electoral history	Constituent LGUs
#	Image	Member	Start	End	Congress	Party	Electoral history	Constituent LGUs
=== Pangasinan's 4th district for the House of Representatives of the Philippines ===
(7)		Cipriano Primicias Sr.	May 25, 1946	December 30, 1949	1st	Nacionalista	Re-elected in 1946.	1946–1972; Alcala, Bautista, Binalonan, Manaoag, Pozorrubio, Santo Tomas, Sison, Urdaneta, Villasis
9		Amadeo J. Pérez	December 30, 1949	December 30, 1969	2nd	Liberal	Elected in 1949.	1946–1972; Alcala, Bautista, Binalonan, Manaoag, Pozorrubio, Santo Tomas, Sison, Urdaneta, Villasis
9		Amadeo J. Pérez	December 30, 1949	December 30, 1969	3rd	Liberal	Re-elected in 1953.	1946–1972; Alcala, Bautista, Binalonan, Manaoag, Pozorrubio, Santo Tomas, Sison, Urdaneta, Villasis
9		Amadeo J. Pérez	December 30, 1949	December 30, 1969	4th	Liberal	Re-elected in 1957.	1946–1972; Alcala, Bautista, Binalonan, Manaoag, Pozorrubio, Santo Tomas, Sison, Urdaneta, Villasis
9		Amadeo J. Pérez	December 30, 1949	December 30, 1969	5th	Liberal	Re-elected in 1961.	1946–1972; Alcala, Bautista, Binalonan, Manaoag, Pozorrubio, Santo Tomas, Sison, Urdaneta, Villasis
9		Amadeo J. Pérez	December 30, 1949	December 30, 1969	6th	Liberal	Re-elected in 1965.	1946–1972; Alcala, Bautista, Binalonan, Manaoag, Pozorrubio, Santo Tomas, Sison, Urdaneta, Villasis
10		Antonio P. Villar Sr.	December 30, 1969	September 23, 1972	7th	Nacionalista	Elected in 1969. Removed from office after imposition of martial law.	1946–1972; Alcala, Bautista, Binalonan, Manaoag, Pozorrubio, Santo Tomas, Sison, Urdaneta, Villasis
District dissolved into the twelve-seat Region I's at-large district for the Interim Batasang Pambansa, followed by the six-seat Pangasinan's at-large district for the Regular Batasang Pambansa.
District re-created February 2, 1987.
11		Jose de Venecia Jr.	June 30, 1987	June 30, 1998	8th	Lakas ng Bansa	Elected in 1987.	1987–present Dagupan, Manaoag, Mangaldan, San Fabian, San Jacinto
11		Jose de Venecia Jr.	June 30, 1987	June 30, 1998	9th	Lakas	Re-elected in 1992.	1987–present Dagupan, Manaoag, Mangaldan, San Fabian, San Jacinto
11		Jose de Venecia Jr.	June 30, 1987	June 30, 1998	10th	Lakas	Re-elected in 1995.	1987–present Dagupan, Manaoag, Mangaldan, San Fabian, San Jacinto
12		Benjamin S. Lim	June 30, 1998	June 30, 2001	11th	Lakas	Elected in 1998.	1987–present Dagupan, Manaoag, Mangaldan, San Fabian, San Jacinto
(11)		Jose de Venecia Jr.	June 30, 2001	June 30, 2010	12th	Lakas	Elected in 2001.	1987–present Dagupan, Manaoag, Mangaldan, San Fabian, San Jacinto
(11)		Jose de Venecia Jr.	June 30, 2001	June 30, 2010	13th	Lakas	Re-elected in 2004.	1987–present Dagupan, Manaoag, Mangaldan, San Fabian, San Jacinto
(11)		Jose de Venecia Jr.	June 30, 2001	June 30, 2010	14th	Independent	Re-elected in 2007.	1987–present Dagupan, Manaoag, Mangaldan, San Fabian, San Jacinto
13		Gina de Venecia	June 30, 2010	June 30, 2016	15th	NPC	Elected in 2010.	1987–present Dagupan, Manaoag, Mangaldan, San Fabian, San Jacinto
13		Gina de Venecia	June 30, 2010	June 30, 2016	16th	NPC	Re-elected in 2013.	1987–present Dagupan, Manaoag, Mangaldan, San Fabian, San Jacinto
14		Christopher de Venecia	June 30, 2016	June 30, 2025	17th	Liberal	Elected in 2016.	1987–present Dagupan, Manaoag, Mangaldan, San Fabian, San Jacinto
14		Christopher de Venecia	June 30, 2016	June 30, 2025	18th	Lakas	Re-elected in 2019.	1987–present Dagupan, Manaoag, Mangaldan, San Fabian, San Jacinto
14		Christopher de Venecia	June 30, 2016	June 30, 2025	19th	Lakas	Re-elected in 2022.	1987–present Dagupan, Manaoag, Mangaldan, San Fabian, San Jacinto
(13)		Gina de Venecia	June 30, 2025	Incumbent	20th	Lakas	Elected in 2025.	1987–present Dagupan, Manaoag, Mangaldan, San Fabian, San Jacinto

== Election results ==
=== 2025 ===
2025 Philippine House of Representatives elections
Party	Candidate	Votes	%
Lakas	Gina de Venecia	229,189	84.75
Independent	Alipio Fernandez	41,239	15.25
Total votes		270,428	100.00
Lakas hold			

=== 2022 ===
2022 Philippine House of Representatives elections
Party	Candidate	Votes	%
Lakas	Christopher de Venecia	213,020	
Independent	Alipio Fernandez	53,162	
Total votes			
Lakas hold			

=== 2019 ===
2019 Philippine House of Representatives elections
Party	Candidate	Votes	%
Lakas	Christopher de Venecia	166,917	
Independent	Alipio Fernandez	43,718	
Independent	Red Erfe-Mejia	15,655	
Independent	Winky Manaois	1,680	
Total votes			
Lakas hold			

=== 2016 ===
2016 Philippine House of Representatives elections
Party	Candidate	Votes	%
Liberal	Christopher de Venecia	172,089	
Independent	Angel Aquino	6,525	
Independent	Arvin De Guzman	4,829	
Independent	Mario Operaña	2,293	
Independent	Ronaldo Ebreo	1,897	
Margin of victory			
Invalid or blank votes		42,978	
Total votes		230,611	
Liberal gain from NPC			

=== 2013 ===
2013 Philippine House of Representatives elections
Party	Candidate	Votes	%
NPC	Gina de Venecia	157,784	79.04
Nacionalista	Celia Lim	27,184	13.62
Margin of victory		130,600	65.43%
Invalid or blank votes		14,648	7.34
Total votes		199,616	100.00
NPC hold			

=== 2010 ===
2010 Philippine House of Representatives elections
Party	Candidate	Votes	%
NPC	Gina de Venecia	128,198	66.35
Independent	Celia Lim	64,017	33.13
Independent	Alejandro Dacano	1,007	0.52
Valid ballots		193,222	96.55
Invalid or blank votes		6,912	3.45
Total votes		200,134	100.00
NPC gain from Independent			

== See also ==
- Legislative districts of Pangasinan

House of Representatives of the Philippines
Preceded by Palawan's 2nd congressional district	Home district of the speaker July 27, 1992 – June 5, 1998	Succeeded by Las Piñas's at-large congressional district
Preceded by Quezon City's 4th congressional district	Home district of the speaker July 23, 2001 – February 5, 2008	Succeeded by Davao City's 1st congressional district
