= San Jacinto, Pangasinan =

Municipality in Pangasinan, Philippines

San Jacinto
- Municipality
- Municipality of San Jacinto
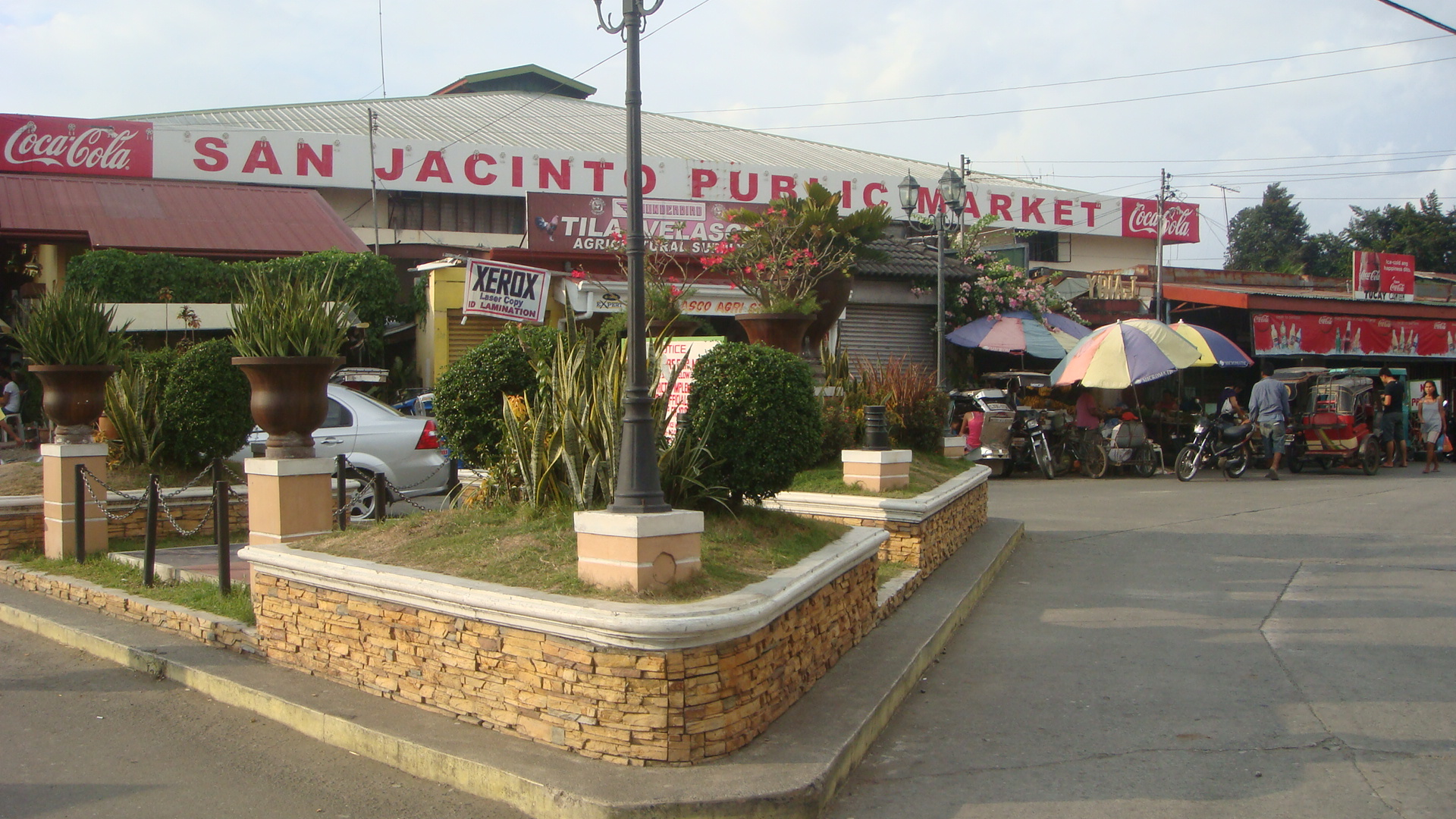
- Public market

- Seal

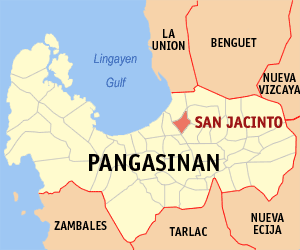
- Map of Pangasinan with San Jacinto highlighted
- Interactive map of San Jacinto
- Location within the Philippines
- Coordinates: 16°04′21″N 120°26′28″E
- Country: Philippines
- Region: Ilocos Region
- Province: Pangasinan
- District: 4th district
- Founded: August 17, 1598
- Annexation to Manaoag: October 8, 1903
- Chartered: October 31, 1906
- Founder: Herminigildo Milgar
- Named for: Hyacinth of Poland
- Barangays: 19 (see Barangays)

Government
  - Type: Sangguniang Bayan
  - Mayor: Leo de Vera
  - Vice Mayor: Robert O. de Vera
  - Representative: Christopher P. de Venecia
  - Municipal Council: Members: Anna Mari C. Abarcar; Teodora Nicomedez; Juanito Aldrin S. Sotong; Richard R. Jornadal; Benjamin A. Visperas; Virginia B. Zarate; Sean Alexis D. Cardozo; Manuel C. Ogoy
  - Electorate: 29,354 voters (2025)

Area
  - Total: 44.18 km^{2} (17.06 sq mi)
- Elevation: 14 m (46 ft)
- Highest elevation: 101 m (331 ft)
- Lowest elevation: 0 m (0 ft)

Population (2024 census)
  - Total: 44,713
  - Density: 1,012/km^{2} (2,621/sq mi)
  - Households: 10,348

Economy
  - Income class: 1st municipal income class
  - Poverty incidence: 15.79% (2023)
  - Revenue: ₱ 209.4 million (2024)
  - Assets: ₱ 711.1 million (2024)
  - Expenditure: ₱ 156.3 million (2024)
  - Liabilities: ₱ 51.02 million (2024)

Service provider
  - Electricity: Central Pangasinan Electric Cooperative (CENPELCO)
- Time zone: UTC+8 (PST)
- ZIP code: 2431
- PSGC: 0105534000
- IDD : area code: +63 (0)75
- Native languages: Pangasinan; Ilocano; Tagalog

San Jacinto, officially the Municipality of San Jacinto (Pangasinan: Baley na San Jacinto; Ilocano: Ili ti San Jacinto; Tagalog: Bayan ng San Jacinto), is a 3rd class municipality in the province of Pangasinan, Philippines. According to the 2024 census, it has a population of 44,713 people.

== Etymology ==
Padre Herminigildo Milgar founded the town on August 17, 1598, which was named after Hyacinth of Poland, canonized on April 17, 1594, by Pope Clement VIII.

== History ==
San Jacinto was founded by Padre Herminigildo Milgar on August 17, 1598. It became a municipality in 1601, one of the oldest towns in Pangasinan.

On October 8, 1903, Urbiztondo was absorbed by the municipality of Manaoag by virtue of Philippine Commission Act No. 931. It was later separated as a re-established municipality on October 31, 1906.

== Geography ==
San Jacinto is situated 28.37 kilometers (17.63 mi) from the provincial capital Lingayen, and 207.23 kilometers (128.77 mi) from the country's capital city of Manila.

=== Barangays ===
San Jacinto is politically subdivided into 19 barangays. Each barangay consists of puroks, and some have sitios.

- Awai
- Bolo
- Capaoay (Poblacion East)
- Casibong
- Imelda (Decrito)
- Guibel
- Labney
- Magsaysay (Capay)
- Lobong
- Macayug
- Bagong Pag-asa
- San Guillermo (Poblacion West)
- San Jose
- San Juan
- San Roque
- San Vicente
- Santa Cruz
- Santa Maria
- Santo Tomas

=== Climate ===
Climate data for San Jacinto, Pangasinan
Month	Jan	Feb	Mar	Apr	May	Jun	Jul	Aug	Sep	Oct	Nov	Dec	Year
Mean daily maximum °C (°F)	31 (88)	31 (88)	33 (91)	34 (93)	34 (93)	33 (91)	32 (90)	31 (88)	31 (88)	32 (90)	31 (88)	31 (88)	32 (90)
Mean daily minimum °C (°F)	21 (70)	21 (70)	23 (73)	25 (77)	25 (77)	25 (77)	25 (77)	24 (75)	24 (75)	24 (75)	23 (73)	22 (72)	24 (74)
Average precipitation mm (inches)	4.3 (0.17)	19.1 (0.75)	27.3 (1.07)	45.2 (1.78)	153.3 (6.04)	271.3 (10.68)	411.1 (16.19)	532 (20.9)	364.4 (14.35)	182.5 (7.19)	56.3 (2.22)	24.4 (0.96)	2,091.2 (82.3)
Average rainy days	3	2	3	5	14	17	22	23	21	13	7	4	134
Source: World Weather Online (modeled/calculated data, not measured locally)

== Demographics ==
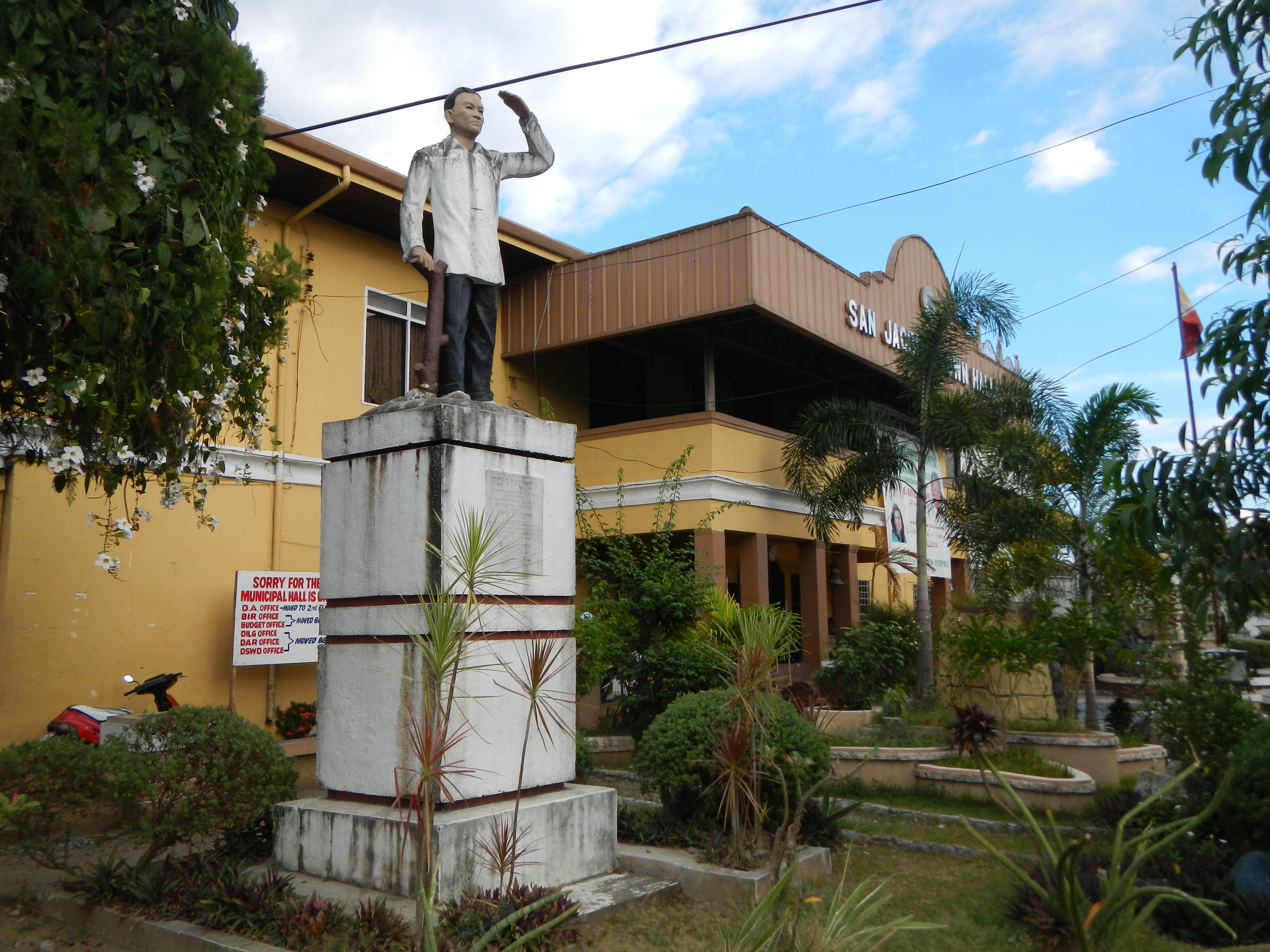
Town hall (with statue of former President Ramon Magsaysay)

Population census of San Jacinto

Year	Pop.	±% p.a.
1903	5,014	—
1918	6,714	+1.97%
1939	7,853	+0.75%
1948	10,313	+3.07%
1960	13,384	+2.20%
1970	16,583	+2.16%

Year	Pop.	±% p.a.
1975	18,722	+2.46%
1980	20,612	+1.94%
1990	25,722	+2.24%
1995	28,416	+1.88%
2000	32,758	+3.10%
2007	35,591	+1.15%

Year	Pop.	±% p.a.
2010	37,737	+2.15%
2015	40,848	+1.52%
2020	44,351	+1.75%
2024	44,713	+0.20%

Source: Philippine Statistics Authority

=== Religion ===
==== Parish Church of St. Hyacinth ====
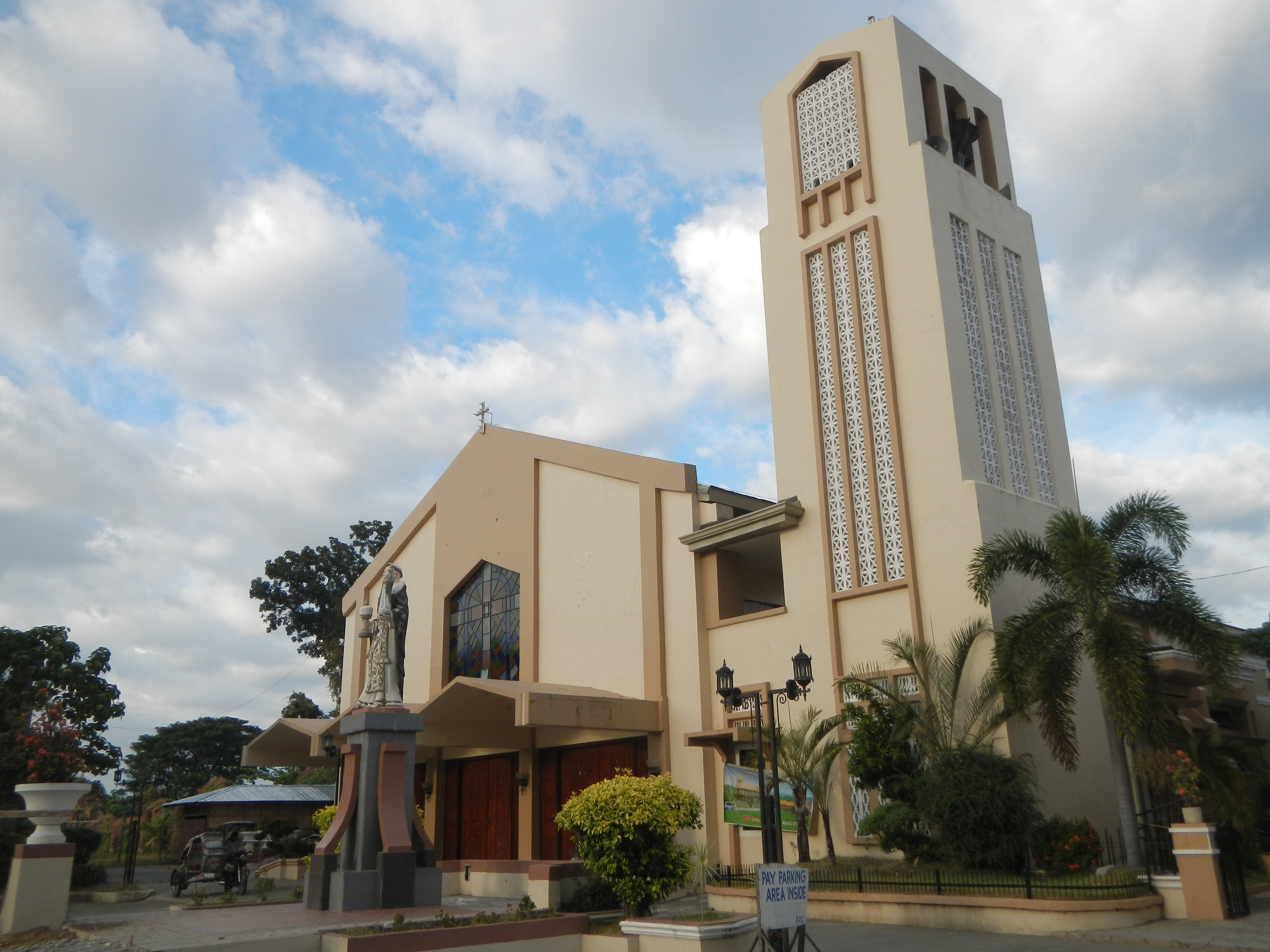
St. Hyacinth Parish Church

The 1590 Parish Church of St. Hyacinth (Vicariate of Santo Tomas de Aquino, San Jacinto, 2431 Pangasinan, 23,628 Catholics, feast day, August 17, Parish priests are Rev. Fr. Roland Anthony S. Gavina) is under the jurisdiction of the Roman Catholic Archdiocese of Lingayen-Dagupan, Roman Catholic Diocese of Urdaneta (Vicariate III: Queen of the Most Holy Rosary). Its Vicar Forane is Rev. Fr. Genaro A. Herramia.

Father Diego Aduarte accounts that the 1898 Pueblo of San Jacinto existed by virtue of the Dominican capitular acts of 1604 statement that the Ilocanos settled at San Jacinto.

In 1699, it was granted a resident vicar but later annexed to Manaoag or Mangaldan. As early as 1598, San Jacinto church existed, but in 1719 the 1653 new church was burned paving for the construction of a new one in 1731 whose façade and tower were destroyed by the 1848 and 1892 earthquakes.

Saint Hyacinth of Poland (Hyacinth), (b. ca. 1185 in Kamień Śląski (Ger. Groß Stein) near Opole (Ger. Oppeln), Upper Silesia – d. 15 August 1257) was a Doctor of Sacred Studies and a secular priest, he worked to reform women's monasteries in his native Poland.

== Economy ==
Poverty incidence of San Jacinto (%)

Source: Philippine Statistics Authority

The main sources of livelihood of the residents are agriculture, construction, poultry, dressing plant, cornhusk weaving, sand and gravel crushing plant and bag-and basket-making. 4th District Rep. Gina de Venecia initiated the Bayong and Corn–Husk Development Project fashioning these waste products into luxurious bags & baskets, and moccasins.

From Manila, one can reach San Jacinto, Pangasinan in 2 hours and 36 minutes without traffic via North Luzon Expressway in the distance of 204 km.

San Jacinto corn husks bayongs under the Jaime Ongpin Foundation replaced plastic bags due to environmental concerns of San Jacinto Weavers Association led by its president, Sixto Aquino. The town Memorandum of Agreement (MOA) granted resident trainings on Basic Bayong Weaving; Dyeing Raw Materials, Skills Upgrading, and Intensive Product Design & Innovations.

In 2011, San Jacinto had dispersed Tilapia fingerlings.

== Government ==
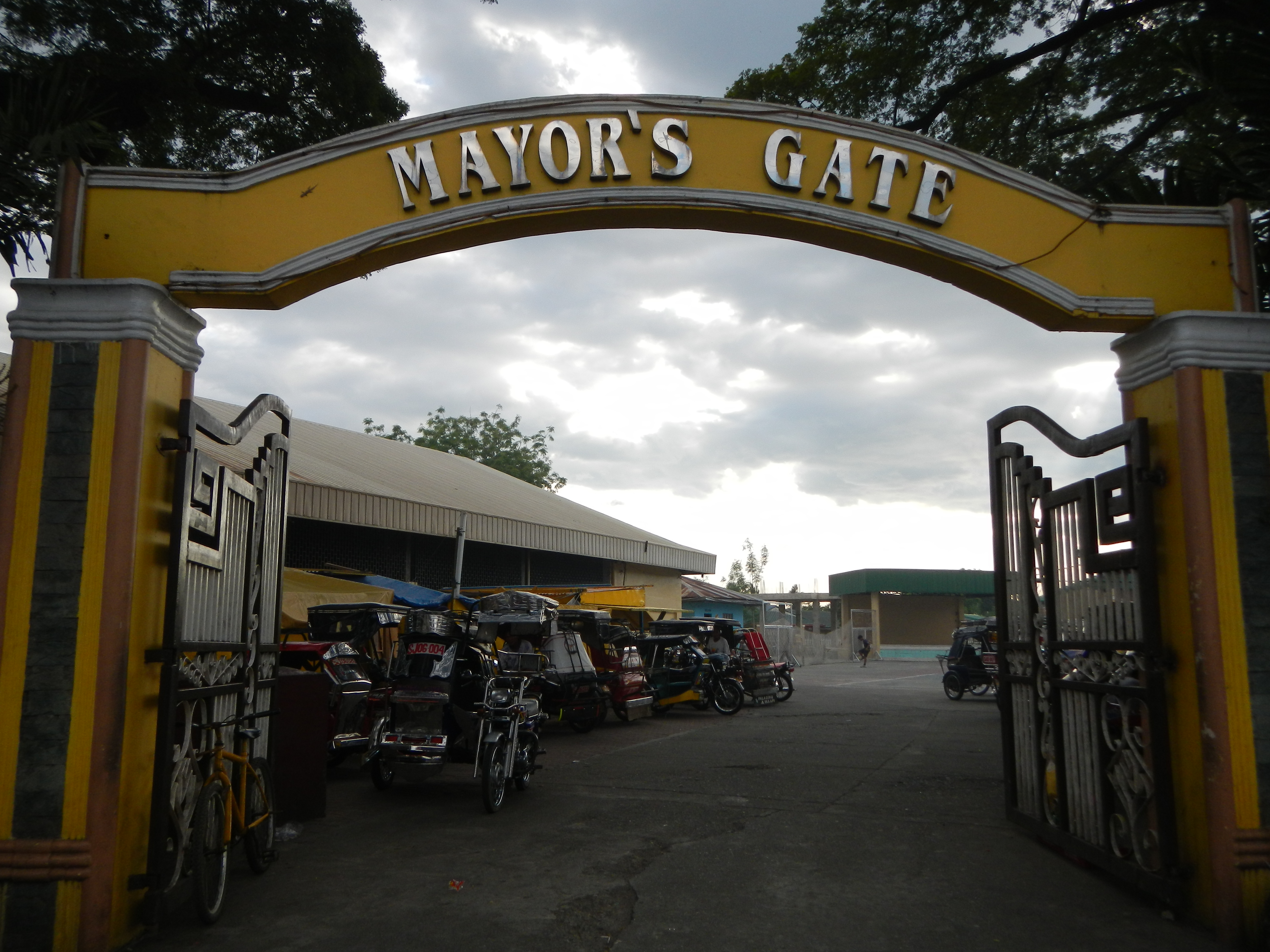
Mayor' Gate

San Jacinto is part of the fourth congressional district of the province of Pangasinan. It is governed by a mayor, designated as its local chief executive, and by a municipal council as its legislative body in accordance with the local government code. The mayor, vice mayor, and councilors are elected directly by the people through an election held every three years.

The San Jacinto Town Hall was constructed from 1959 to 1963. In 2012, it began its (unfinished) renovation.

The chief executive of San Jacinto is its municipal mayor, Leo F. De Vera with his municipal vice mayor, Robert O. De Vera, with eight sangguniang bayan councilors who hold offices at the Municipal Town Hall and Legislative Office/Session Hall.

=== Elected officials ===
Members of the Municipal Council (2025-):

- Congressman: Christopher George Martin P. de Venecia
- Mayor: Leo F. De Vera
- Vice-Mayor: Robert O. De Vera
- Councilors:
  - Atty. Anna Mari C. Abarcar
  - Juanito Aldrin S. Sotong II
  - Teodora Nicomedez
  - Richard R. Jornadal
  - Benjamin A. Visperas
  - Virginia B. Zarate
  - Sean Alexis D. Cardozo
  - Manuel C. Ogoy

== Education ==
The San Jacinto Schools District Office governs all educational institutions within the municipality. It oversees the management and operations of all private and public, from primary to secondary schools.

=== Primary and elementary schools ===
- Alejandro A. Gamboa Elementary School
- Awai Elementary School
- Basilio B. Villanueva Elementary School of Bolo
- Bernabe Q. Biagtan Elementary School
- Casibong Elementary School
- East Central School
- Labney Elementary School
- Lobong Elementary School
- Macayug Elementary School
- Osnit Elementary School
- San Jacinto Catholic School
- San Jacinto National High School
- San Jose Elementary School
- San Roque Elementary School
- San Vicente Elementary School
- Sta. Cruz Elementary School
- Sta. Maria Elementary School
- Sunrisers Merryland School
- West Central School

=== Secondary schools ===
- Lobong National High School
- San Jacinto Catholic School
- San Jacinto National High School
- Sunrisers Merryland School
