= List of bridges in the Philippines =

This is a list of bridges in the Philippines. This list includes notable viaducts or land bridges built over land mass, on coastal areas, riverbanks and on diversion roads.

== Historical and architectural interest bridges ==
	Name	Distinction	Length	Type	Carries Crosses	Opened	Location	Region	Ref.
1	Malagonlong Bridge	National Cultural Treasure; National Historical Landmark	136 m (446 ft)	Masonry; 5 semi-circular arches	Dumaca River	1850	Tayabas; 14°00′46.6″N 121°37′00.6″E	Calabarzon	
2	Puente Colgante (Manila) dismantled in 1939		110 m (360 ft)	Suspension; Wooden deck, masonry pylons	Pasig River	1852	Manila; 14°35′43.6″N 120°58′55.9″E	Metro Manila	

== Major bridges ==
This table presents a non-exhaustive list of the road and railway bridges with spans greater than 100 metres (328 ft) or total lengths longer than 5,000 metres (16,404 ft).

Photo	Rank	Name	Span	Length	Type	Carries Crosses	Opened	Location	Region	Ref.
	1	Cebu–Cordova Link Expressway	390 m (1,280 ft)	8,900 m (29,200 ft)	Cable-stayed; Concrete box girder deck, concrete pylons 60+65+390+65+60	Cebu–Cordova Link Expressway; Mactan Channel	2022	Cebu City–Cordova; 10°17′12.7″N 123°53′56.2″E	Central Visayas	
	2	Macapagal Bridge	360 m (1,180 ft)	882 m (2,894 ft)	Cable-stayed; Steel girder deck, 1 concrete pylon	Mayor Democrito D. Plaza II Avenue; Agusan River	2007	Butuan; 8°55′21.8″N 125°33′13.6″E	Caraga	
	3	Magapit Suspension Bridge	256 m (840 ft)	410 m (1,350 ft)	Suspension; Steel truss deck, steel pylons 76+256+76	Pan-Philippine Highway; Cagayan River	1978	Lal-lo; 18°07′19.9″N 121°40′21.0″E	Cagayan Valley	
	4	San Juanico Bridge	192 m (630 ft)	2,164 m (7,100 ft)	Truss; Steel; 64+112+192+112	Pan-Philippine Highway; San Juanico Strait	1973	Tacloban–Santa Rita; 11°18′03.4″N 124°58′12.6″E	Eastern Visayas	
	5	Marcelo Fernan Bridge	185 m (607 ft)	1,237 m (4,058 ft)	Extradosed; Concrete box girder deck, concrete pylons 111+185+111	N841 highway Mactan Channel	1999	Mandaue–Lapu-Lapu City; 10°19′35.5″N 123°57′59.4″E	Central Visayas	
	6	Bamban Bridge	174 m (571 ft)	177 m (581 ft)	Arch; Steel tied arch Bow-string bridge	MacArthur Highway; Sacobia River	1998	Bamban–Mabalacat; 15°15′37.3″N 120°33′35″E	Central Luzon	
	7	Agas-Agas Bridge	150 m (490 ft)	350 m (1,150 ft)	Box girder Prestressed concrete 99+150+99	Pan-Philippine Highway	2009	Sogod; 10°29′48.2″N 124°59′52.6″E	Eastern Visayas	
	8	Panguil Bay Bridge	150 m (490 ft)	2,360 m (7,740 ft)	Extradosed; Concrete box girder deck, concrete pylons 85+150+85	Road bridge Panguil Bay	2024	Tangub–Tubod; 8°03′20.6″N 123°46′39.7″E	Northern Mindanao	
	9	Mactan–Mandaue Bridge	144 m (472 ft)	864 m (2,835 ft)	Truss; Steel; 112+144+112	N82 highway Mactan Channel	1973	Mandaue–Lapu-Lapu City; 10°19′11.4″N 123°57′21.0″E	Central Visayas	
	10	Guadalupe Bridge (MRT)	135 m (443 ft)		Arch; Steel tied arch Bow-string bridge	3 MRT Line 3 (Metro Manila); Pasig River	1998	Manila; 14°34′06.4″N 121°02′45.9″E	Metro Manila	
	11	Mawo Bridge	130 m (430 ft)(x2)	259 m (850 ft)	Arch; Steel tied arch Bow-string bridge	Pan-Philippine Highway; Mauo River	1976	Victoria; 12°26′44.6″N 124°18′57.5″E	Eastern Visayas	
	12	Biliran Bridge	128 m (420 ft)	252 m (827 ft)	Arch; Steel tied arch Bow-string bridge	N681 highway Biliran Strait; Carigara Bay	1976	Biliran–Leyte; 11°27′22.2″N 124°28′46.6″E	Eastern Visayas	
	13	Santa Monica–Lawton Bridge	105 m (344 ft)	687 m (2,254 ft)	Box girder Prestressed concrete 53+105+53	Road bridge Pasig River	2021	Manila; 14°33′56.7″N 121°03′17.3″E	Metro Manila	
	14	Clarin Bridge	104 m (341 ft)	104 m (341 ft)	Arch; Steel tied arch Bow-string bridge	N850 highway Loboc River	2022	Loay; 9°36′08.7″N 124°00′33.3″E	Central Visayas	
	15	Quezon Bridge	102 m (335 ft)	256 m (840 ft)	Arch; Steel through arch	N170 highway Pasig River	1939	Manila; 14°35′44.0″N 120°58′55.7″E	Metro Manila	
	16	Liloan Bridge		298 m (978 ft)	Arch; Steel tied arch Bow-string bridge	Pan-Philippine Highway; Panaon Strait	1979	Liloan; 10°09′45.9″N 125°07′42.5″E	Eastern Visayas	
	17	Magsaysay Bridge		856 m (2,808 ft)	Truss; Steel	Butuan–Cagayan de Oro–Iligan Road; Agusan River	1960	Butuan; 8°56′52.9″N 125°32′47.2″E	Caraga	
	18	LRT Line 1 Viaduct		19,600 m (64,300 ft)	Beam bridge Box girder Prestressed concrete	LRT Line 1 (Metro Manila); San Juan River; Pasig River; Parañaque River	1984	Manila; 14°35′48.4″N 120°58′51.0″E	Metro Manila	(Note: The South Extension Project of the LRT Line 1 is under construction and will add 10.5 km (6.5 mi) of elevated viaducts in 2024.)
	19	Candaba Viaduct		5,000 m (16,000 ft)	Beam bridge Twin bridges Prestressed concrete	E1 expressway North Luzon Expressway; Candaba Swamp; Pampanga River	1977	Apalit–Pulilan; 14°57′15.7″N 120°46′35.9″E	Central Luzon	

== Under construction and proposed bridges ==
This table presents a non-exhaustive list of the road and railway bridges with spans greater than 100 metres (328 ft) or total lengths longer than 1,000 metres (3,281 ft).

	Name	Span	Length	Type	Carries Crosses	Opened	Location	Region	Ref.
1	Bataan–Cavite Interlink Bridge; South Channel Bridge project	900 m (3,000 ft)	32,150 m (105,480 ft)	Cable-stayed; Steel box girder deck, concrete pylons	Road bridge Manila Bay	2028	Mariveles–Naic; 14°21′28.0″N 120°38′46.7″E	Central Luzon; Calabarzon	
2	Bataan–Cavite Interlink Bridge; North Channel Bridge project	400 m (1,300 ft)	32,150 m (105,480 ft)	Cable-stayed; Steel box girder deck, concrete pylons 200+400+200	Road bridge Manila Bay	2028	Mariveles–Naic; 14°25′00.6″N 120°35′49.9″E	Central Luzon; Calabarzon	
3	Second San Juanico Bridge project	350 m (1,150 ft)	960 m (3,150 ft)	Arch; Steel through arch 125+350+125	Road bridge San Juanico Strait	2027	Babatngon–Santa Rita; 11°23′30.6″N 124°58′52.7″E	Eastern Visayas	
4	Davao–Samal Bridge project	250 m (820 ft)	3,980 m (13,060 ft)	Extradosed; Concrete pylons	Road bridge Pakiputan Strait	2027	Davao City–Samal; 7°06′15″N 125°39′30″E	Davao Region	
5	Fourth Cebu–Mactan Bridge project	215 m (705 ft)	3,300 m (10,800 ft)	Box girder Steel; 150+215+150	Road bridge Mactan Channel		Mandaue–Lapu-Lapu City; 10°19′54.1″N 123°58′30.0″E	Central Visayas	
6	Alcala Bridge project	140 m (460 ft)(x2)	450 m (1,480 ft)	Arch; Steel through arch 85+2x140+85	Road bridge Cagayan River	2025	Alcala; 17°54′58.9″N 121°38′13.3″E	Cagayan Valley	
7	Guimaras–Negros Link Bridge project		13,110 m (43,010 ft)	Cable-stayed	Road bridge Guimaras Strait		San Lorenzo–Pulupandan; 10°32′23.9″N 122°45′03.9″E	Western Visayas	
8	Iloilo–Guimaras Link Bridge project		4,970 m (16,310 ft)	Cable-stayed	Road bridge Iloilo Strait		Leganes–Buenavista; 10°45′34.3″N 122°38′08.5″E	Western Visayas	

- Mindoro–Batangas Super Bridge
- Negros–Cebu Link Bridge
- Roma Point Bridge
- Manguisoc Bridge (Mercedes, Camarines Norte)
- Daet Bridge 1 & 2 (Daet, Camarines Norte)
- Cory Aquino Boulevard Extension Mega Express Pro Max 1 Terabyte Fully Paid (with Screen Protector and Clear Case)

== Alphabetical list ==
Bridge	Carries	Spans	Region	Length in meters	Opened	Image
Agas-Agas Bridge	AH 26 (N1) (Pan-Philippine Highway)	Kahupian Valley in Sogod, Southern Leyte	Eastern Visayas	350	2009	
Agat (Bued) Bridge	N2 (Manila North Road)	Bued River between Sison and Rosario, La Union	Ilocos Region	540	1991	
Aguang Bridge	N112 (Baler–Casiguran Road)	Dimanibong River in Baler, Aurora	Central Luzon	804.42	1991	
Agus Bridge	N9 (Butuan–Cagayan de Oro–Iligan Road)	Agus River in Iligan, Lanao del Norte	Northern Mindanao	104	1978	
Aluling Bridge	N205 (Tagudin–Cervantes–Sabangan Road)	Abra River between Cervantes, Ilocos Sur and Tadian, Mountain Province	Ilocos Region and Cordillera Administrative Region	180	2013	
Amburayan Bridge	N2 (Manila North Road)	Amburayan River between Tagudin, Ilocos Sur and Sudipen, La Union	Ilocos Region	536	2009	
Amnay Bridge	N450 (Mindoro West Coastal Road)	Amnay River in Sablayan, Occidental Mindoro	Mimaropa	407.20	1985	
Anda Bridge	Anda Road	Kakiputan Channel between Luzon and Anda islands	Ilocos Region	400	1992	
Bago Bridge	N6 (Bacolod South By-Pass Road)	Bago River in Bago, Negros Occidental	Negros Island Region	270.00	1980	
Bamban Bridge	N2 (MacArthur Highway)	Sacobia River between Bamban, Tarlac and Mabalacat, Pampanga	Central Luzon	179.20	1998	
Bato Bridge	Bato–Baras Road	Bato River in Bato, Catanduanes	Bicol Region	320.60	2002	
Biliran Bridge	N681 (Lemon–Leyte–Biliran Road)	Biliran Strait between Biliran, Biliran and Leyte, Leyte	Eastern Visayas	251.96	1976	
Bugallon Bridge	N55 (Romulo Highway)	Agno River in Lingayen, Pangasinan	Ilocos Region	393.24	2000	
Buntun Bridge	N51 (Santiago–Tuguegarao Road)	Rio Grande de Cagayan between Tuguegarao and Solana, Cagayan	Cagayan Valley	1,102.65	1970	
Calaba Bridge	Abra–Ilocos Norte Road	Lagben River between Bangued and La Paz, Abra	Cordillera Administrative Region	906	2005	
Cangaranan Bridge	N501 (Iloilo–Antique Road)	Cangaranan River in Bugasong, Antique	Western Visayas	656.20	2004	
Cansaga Bay Bridge	N840 (Consolacion–Tayud–Liloan Road)	Cansaga Bay between Mandaue and Consolacion, Cebu	Central Visayas	1,250.65	2010	
Carlos P. Romulo Bridge	Camiling–Malasique–Sta. Barbara Road	Agno River between Camiling, Tarlac and Bayambang, Pangasinan	Central Luzon and Ilocos Region	444.10	1945	
Candaba Viaduct	E1 (North Luzon Expressway)	Pampanga River between Apalit, Pampanga and Pulilan, Bulacan	Central Luzon	5,000	1976	
Caraga Bridge	N74 (Surigao–Davao Coastal Road)	Kalinawan River in Caraga, Davao Oriental	Davao Region	280.50	2017	
Cawayan Bridge	AH 26 (N1) (Pan-Philippine Highway)	Cawayan River in Sorsogon City, Sorsogon	Bicol Region	157.62	1977	
Cebu–Cordova Bridge	Cebu–Cordova Link Expressway	Mactan Channel from Cordova, Cebu to South Road Properties in Cebu City	Central Visayas	8,900	2022	
Cebu South Coastal Road Viaduct	N840 (Cebu South Coastal Road)	Mactan Channel from Ermita to South Road Properties in Cebu City	Central Visayas	1,501.41	2003	
Datu Sahid Piang Bridge	N940 (Midayap–Makar Road)	Tamontaka River in Datu Piang, Maguindanao del Sur	Bangsamoro	312.45	1994	
Davao River Bridge	N913 (Davao City Diversion Road)	Davao River in Davao City	Davao Region	140.60	2001	
Domalandan Bridge	Lingayen–Labrador Road	Agno River in Lingayen, Pangasinan	Ilocos Region	604.35	2006	
Don Mariano Marcos Bridge	Abra–Kalinga National Road	Lagben River between Tayum and Dolores, Abra	Cordillera Administrative Region	889	1974	
Don Teofilo Sison Bridge	N2 (MacArthur Highway)	Agno River between Rosales and Villasis	Ilocos Region	650	1990	
General Luna Bridge	AH 26 (N1) (Pan-Philippine Highway)	Pampanga River in Cabanatuan, Nueva Ecija	Central Luzon	606.14	1974	
Gilbert Bridge	N2 (Manila North Road)	Padsan River in Laoag, Ilocos Norte	Ilocos Region	741.13	1973	
Governor Lopez Bridge	N74 (Surigao–Davao Coastal Road)	Casaoman River in Manay, Davao Oriental	Davao Region	308.96	1988	
Governor Miranda Bridge II	AH 26 (N1) (Davao-Agusan National Highway)	Libuganon River between Carmen and Tagum, Davao del Norte	Davao Region	649	2004	
Governor Teodoro Palma Gil Bridge	N74 (Surigao–Davao Coastal Road)	Caraga River in Caraga, Davao Oriental	Davao Region	281.10	2015	
Guimbal Bridge	N501 (Iloilo–Antique Road)	Guimbal River in Guimbal, Iloilo	Western Visayas	350	1935	
Hector Mendoza Bridge	Carmen–Alcala Road	Agno River in Alcala, Pangasinan	Ilocos Region	1,002	2002	
Ilog Bridge	N712 (Bacolod South Road)	Ilog River between Kabankalan and Ilog, Negros Occidental	Negros Island Region	174	1998	
Ilog Parallel Bridge	N712 (Bacolod South Road)	Ilog River between Kabankalan and Ilog, Negros Occidental	Negros Island Region	176	2022	
Iraan Bridge	N490 (Palawan Circumferential Road)	Iraan River in Aborlan, Palawan	Mimaropa	160	2017	
Jones Bridge	Santiago–San Agustin Road	Rio Grande de Cagayan between Jones and San Agustin, Isabela	Cagayan Valley	350	2008	
Kalibo Bridge I	N503 (Aklan East Road)	Aklan River between Numancia and Kalibo, Aklan	Western Visayas	420	1939	
Kalibo Bridge II	N503 (Aklan East Road)	Aklan River between Numancia and Kalibo, Aklan	Western Visayas	450	2017	
Kalibo Bridge III	Kalibo Circumferential Road	Aklan River in Lezo and Kalibo, Aklan	Western Visayas	770	2020	
Kalilayan Bridge	Padre Burgos–Agdangan National Road	Kalilayan River in Unisan, Quezon	Calabarzon	198	1984	
Lisap Bridge	Francis Coronel Road	Bongabong River in Bongabong, Oriental Mindoro	Mimaropa	365	2018	
Old Lucban Bridge	AH 26 (N1) (Manila North Road)	Lucban River in Abulug, Cagayan	Cagayan Valley	826.90	1968	
New Lucban Bridge	AH 26 (N1) (Manila North Road)	Lucban River in Abulug, Cagayan	Cagayan Valley	825	2017	
Lullutan Bridge	Ilagan–Delfin Albano–Mallig Road	Cagayan River in Ilagan, Isabela	Cagayan Valley	500.60	2015	
Macapagal Bridge	N951 (Mayor Democrito D. Plaza II Avenue)	Agusan River in Butuan, Agusan del Norte	Caraga	908	2007	
Macapagal (Palaypay) Bridge	N955 (Gingoog-Claveria-Villanueva Road)	Odiongan River in Gingoog, Misamis Oriental	Northern Mindanao	202	2008	
Mandaue–Mactan Bridge	N82 (Mandaue–Mactan Road)	Mactan Channel between Lapu-Lapu and Mandaue, Cebu	Central Visayas	854	1973	
Magallanes Bridge	Pangasinan–Nueva Vizcaya Road	Viray River in Tayug, Pangasinan	Ilocos Region	344	1980	
Magapit Suspension Bridge	AH 26 (N1) (Bangag-Magapit Road)	Rio Grande de Cagayan in Lal-lo, Cagayan	Cagayan Valley	449.14	1978	
Magat Bridge	N51 (Santiago–Tuguegarao Road)	Magat River between Cabatuan and Aurora, Isabela	Cagayan Valley	926.06	1991	
Magdiwang Bridge	N480 (Sibuyan Circumferential Road)	Nailog River in Magdiwang, Romblon	Mimaropa	180.84	1975	
Magsaysay Bridge	N9 (Butuan–Cagayan de Oro–Iligan Road)	Agusan River in Butuan, Agusan del Norte	Caraga	856.45	1960	
Malogo Bridge	N7 (Bacolod North Road)	Malogo River between Enrique B. Magalona and Victorias, Negros Occidental	Negros Island Region	143.00	1973	
Marcelo Fernan Bridge	N841 (Marcelo B. Fernan Bridge)	Mactan Channel between Lapu-Lapu and Mandaue, Cebu	Central Visayas	1,230.2	1999	
Naguilian Bridge (La Union)	N54 (Naguilian Road)	Balili River in Naguilian, La Union	Ilocos Region	288.60	1997	
Mawo Bridge	AH 26 (N1) (Pan-Philippine Highway)	Mauo River in Victoria, Northern Samar	Eastern Visayas	259	1972	
Naguilian Bridge (Isabela)	AH 26 (N1) (Pan-Philippine Highway)	Rio Grande de Cagayan in Naguilian, Isabela	Cagayan Valley	690	1999	
Narciso Ramos Bridge	Asingan Bypass Road	Agno River between Asingan and Santa Maria, Pangasinan	Ilocos Region	1,448	1990	
New Badiwan Bridge	N208 (Aspiras–Palispis Highway)	Badiwan River (tributary of Aringay River) in Tuba, Benguet	Cordillera Administrative Region	513	2000	
Padilla Bridge	N55 (Romulo Highway)	Agno River in Lingayen, Pangasinan	Ilocos Region	456	1958	
Pagalungan Bridge	N75 (Davao–Cotabato Road)	Rio Grande de Mindanao between Pikit, Cotabato and Pagalungan, Maguindanao del Sur	Bangsamoro	242.70	1950	
Pagsangahan Bridge	N650 (Catanduanes Circumferential Road)	Bato River in San Miguel, Catanduanes	Bicol Region	185.60	2007	
Old Pamplona Bridge	AH 26 (N1) (Manila North Road)	Pamplona River in Pamplona, Cagayan	Cagayan Valley	492.36	1955	
New Pamplona Bridge	AH 26 (N1) (Manila North Road)	Pamplona River in Pamplona, Cagayan	Cagayan Valley	489.80	2016	
Panguil Bay Bridge	Road bridge	Panguil Bay in Tangub, Misamis Occidental and Tubod, Lanao del Norte	Northern Mindanao	2,360	2024	
Pantal Bridge	Judge Jose de Venecia Extension Road	Pantal River in Dagupan, Pangasinan	Ilocos Region	380	2008	
Patapat Viaduct	AH 26 (N1)	Patapat Cliff in Pagudpud, Ilocos Norte	Ilocos Region	1,130.22	1986	
Polo Bridge	N961 (Junction Polo–Dapitan Park National Road)	Dapitan River in Dapitan, Zamboanga del Norte	Zamboanga Peninsula	362.40	1992	
Puntod–Kauswagan Bridge	Opol–Bulua Diversion Road	Cagayan de Oro River in Cagayan de Oro	Northern Mindanao	352	2007	
Quirino Bridge	N2 (Manila North Road)	Abra River between Bantay and Santa, Ilocos Sur	Ilocos Region	456	2007	
Old Quirino (Banaoang) Bridge	N2 (Manila North Road)	Abra River between Bantay and Santa, Ilocos Sur	Ilocos Region	302	1933	
Quirino Bridge	AH 26 (N1) (Cotabato-Lanao Road)	Rio Grande de Mindanao in Cotabato City	Bangsamoro	161.80	1950	
Roxas City (Jumbo) Bridge	Gov. Gabriel Hernandez Avenue–Rizal Street–Calipayan Road	Pan-ay River in Roxas City, Capiz	Western Visayas	128	1997	
Sacobia Bridge	New Clark City–International Airport Access Road	Sacobia River in Bamban, Tarlac	Central Luzon	894	2022	
San Lorenzo Ruiz Memorial Bridge	AH 26 (N1) (Pan-Philippine Highway)	Cagayan River in Bagabag, Nueva Vizcaya	Cagayan Valley	496.60	1990	
San Jose Bridge	Rodriguez Highway	Marikina River in Rodriguez, Rizal	Calabarzon	200	1978	
San Juanico Bridge	AH 26 (N1) (Pan-Philippine Highway)	San Juanico Strait between Tacloban, Leyte and Santa Rita, Samar	Eastern Visayas	2,160	1973	
Santa Maria Centennial Bridge	N2 (Manila North Road)	Santa Maria River in Santa Maria, Ilocos Sur	Ilocos Region	320.60	1998	
Santo Tomas Bridge	Manabo–Bucay Road	Lagben River in Manabo, Abra	Cordillera Administrative Region	690	2013	
Sicopong Bridge	N7 (Dumaguete South Road)	Sicopong River in Santa Catalina, Negros Oriental	Negros Island Region	165.00	1977	
Sindangan Bridge	Ipil–Dipolog Highway	Sindangan River in Sindangan, Zamboanga del Norte	Zamboanga Peninsula	452.70	1967	
Sipocot Bridge	AH 26 (N1) (Pan-Philippine Highway)	Libmanan River in Sipocot, Camarines Sur	Bicol Region	149.35	1972	
Tagoloan Parallel Bridge	N9 (Butuan–Cagayan de Oro–Iligan Road)	Tagoloan River in Tagoloan, Misamis Oriental	Northern Mindanao	529.30	2007	
Talomo-Matina Bridge	Davao City Coastal Bypass Road	Talomo River and Matina River in Davao City, Davao del Sur	Davao Region	660	2023	
Taguibo Bridge II	AH 26 (N1) (Surigao-Butuan National Highway)	Taguibo River in Butuan, Agusan del Norte	Caraga	600	2019	
Tamontaka Bridge	AH 26 (N1) (Marbel-Allah Valley-Cotabato Road)	Tamontaka River between Cotabato City and Datu Odin Sinsuat, Maguindanao del Norte	Bangsamoro	209	1965	
Wawa Bridge	AH 26 (N1) (Pan-Philippine Highway)	Panaon Strait in Liloan, Southern Leyte	Eastern Visayas	297	1977	
Wawa Parallel Bridge	AH 26 (N1) (Davao-Agusan National Highway)	Wawa River between Bayugan and Sibagat, Agusan del Sur	Caraga	240.80	2020	

== See also ==
- Spanish colonial bridges in Tayabas
- List of crossings of the Pasig River
- List of crossings of the Marikina River
- Transportation in the Philippines
- Rail transport in the Philippines
- Philippine highway network
- Philippine expressway network
- Geography of the Philippines
- List of rivers of the Philippines
- List of National Cultural Treasures in the Philippines

== Notes and references ==
- Notes
- Nicolas Janberg. "International Database for Civil and Structural Engineering". Structurae.com.
- Others references
