= Narciso Ramos Bridge =

Highway bridge connects two Pangasinan municipalities

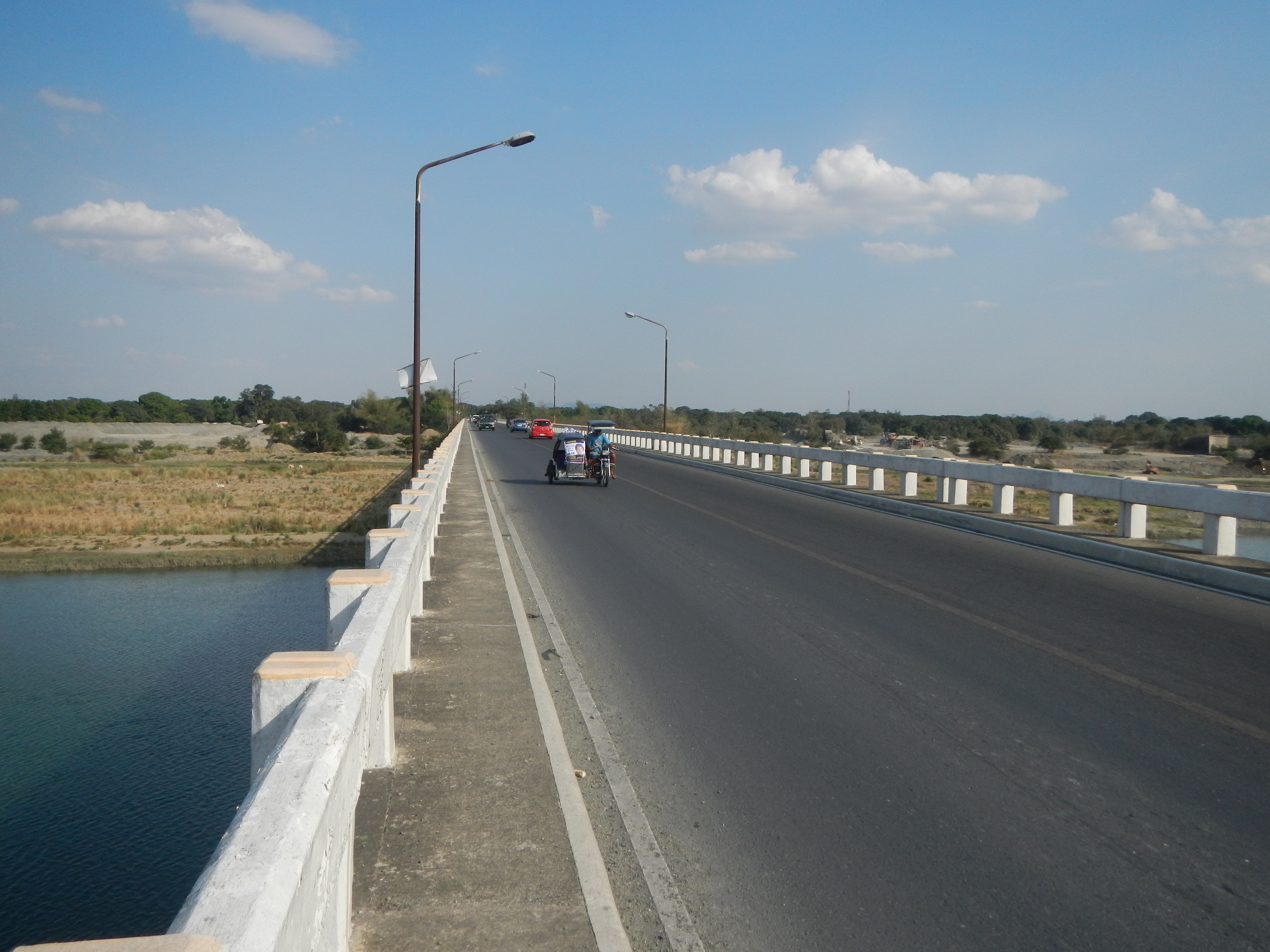
- Coordinates: 15.9869°N 120.6886°E
- Carries: Two lanes of vehicular traffic and pedestrians
- Crosses: Agno River
- Locale: Asingan and Santa Maria, Pangasinan
- Other name(s): Ramos Bridge; Asingan–Sta. Maria Bridge (formerly)
- Named for: Narciso Ramos

Characteristics
- Material: Concrete
- Total length: 1,448 m (4,751 ft)
- Load limit: 15 metric tons (15 long tons; 17 short tons)

History
- Constructed by: Ciriaco Construction Corporation, High Peak Construction
- Construction cost: ₱415.56 million
- Inaugurated: March 17, 1997; 28 years ago

The Narciso Ramos Bridge, formerly known as the Asingan–Sta. Maria Bridge, is a highway bridge which connects the municipalities of Asingan and Santa Maria in Pangasinan, Philippines. Crossing the Agno River, it is part of the Asingan–Sta. Maria Road. It is the longest bridge in the province and the entire Ilocos Region.

== History ==
The bridge was initilally named Asingan–Santa Maria Bridge. Construction began on January 15, 1996, and was finished within a two-year timeline. The ₱415.56-million project was sponsored by Pangasinan 6th district representative Ranjit Shahani, nephew of then President Fidel Ramos; and was undertaken by Ciriaco Construction Corporation and High Peak Construction.

The bridge became operational on March 17, 1997, upon its inauguration by President Ramos. At that time, it was considered the longest in Luzon and the second in the country, only behind San Juanico Bridge in Eastern Visayas.

Shahani later authored a House bill which, in 2001, became Republic Act No. 9030, the law changing the name of the bridge to its present one in honor of his grandfather—legislator, diplomat, and Asingan native Narciso Ramos.

To address concerns on the travellers' safety at night, the municipal government of Asingan funded the installation of solar-powered lights, which was done in two months beginning December 2022.

== Features ==
The 1.4-kilometer bridge has 48 spans, two abutments, and 47 piers.

== Incidents ==
On the afternoon of September 27, 2002, Tayug Regional Trial Court judge Oscar Uson, father of future dance group founder (and government official) Mocha Uson, was assassinated by four suspected motorcycle-riding gunmen, as he was passing the bridge's Asingan part while on his way from work to his home in Dagupan. No arrests have been made since then.
