= San Nicolas, Pangasinan =

Municipality in Pangasinan, Philippines

San Nicolas
- Municipality
- Municipality of San Nicolas
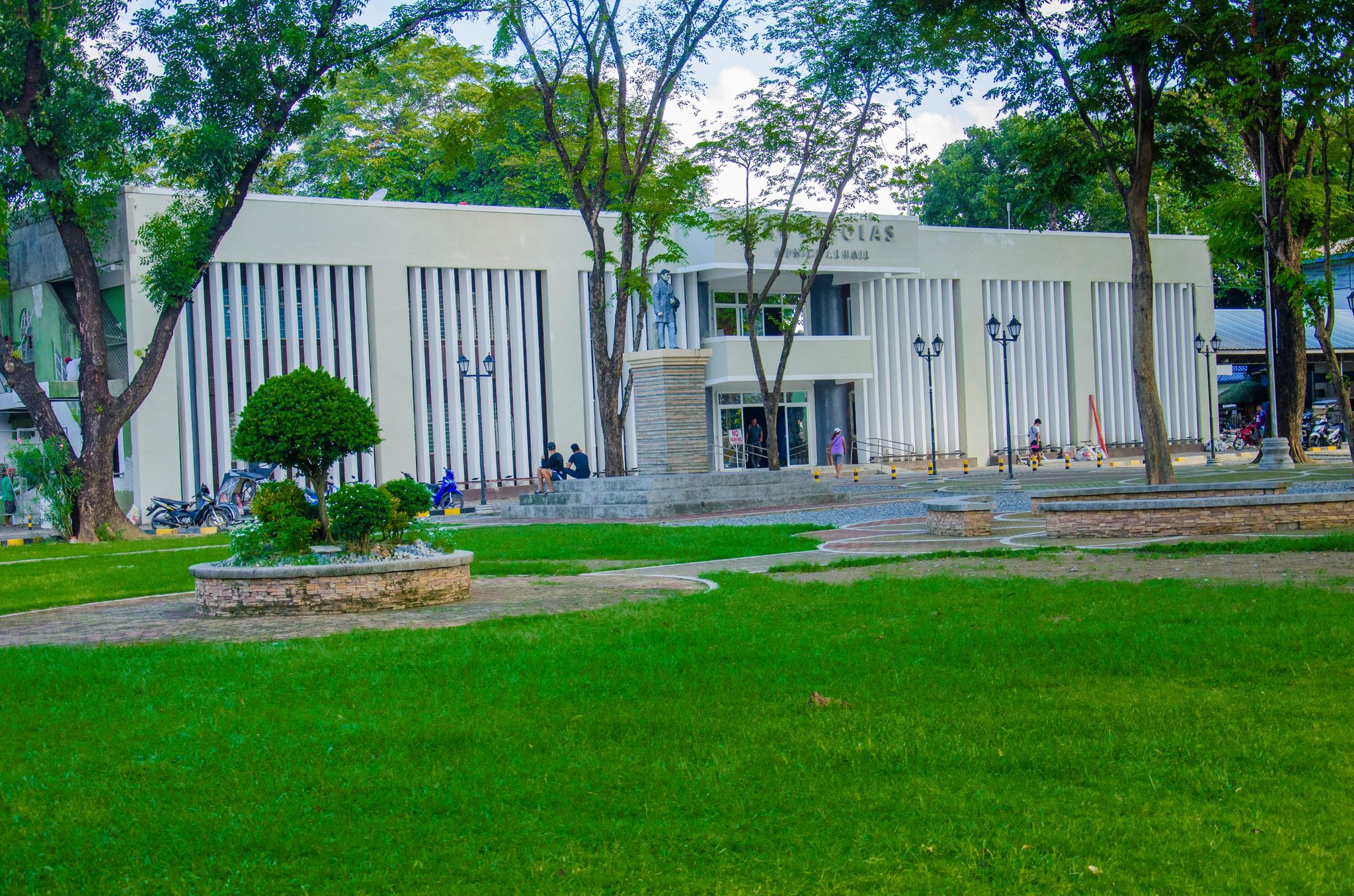
- Municipal Hall

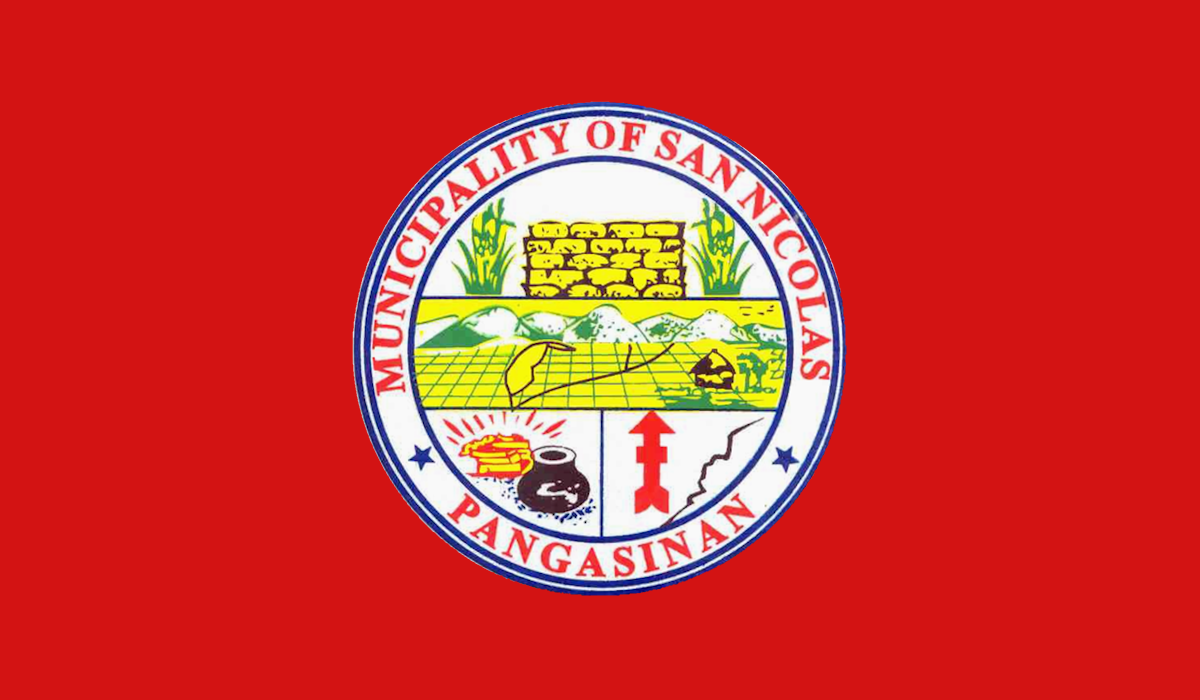
- Flag Seal

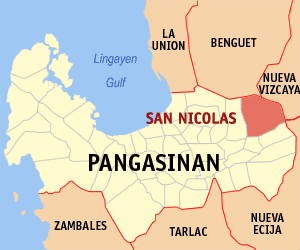
- Map of Pangasinan with San Nicolas highlighted
- Interactive map of San Nicolas
- Location within the Philippines
- Coordinates: 16°04′08″N 120°45′43″E
- Country: Philippines
- Region: Ilocos Region
- Province: Pangasinan
- District: 6th district
- Founded: 1610
- Named for: St. Nicholas of Tolentino
- Barangays: 33 (see Barangays)

Government
  - Type: Sangguniang Bayan
  - Mayor: Alicia Primicias-Enriquez
  - Vice Mayor: Maricon Vindy Operaña
  - Representative: Marlyn L. Primicias-Agabas
  - Municipal Council: Members: Francisco O. Bravo Jr.; Maricon Vindy A. Operaña; Raymond C. Prestoza; Leomar M. Saldivar; Amorsolo R. Pulido; Jose M. Serquiña Jr.; Rosewill P. Descargar; Leoncio V. Saldivar Jr.
  - Electorate: 27,371 voters (2025)

Area
  - Total: 210.20 km^{2} (81.16 sq mi)
- Elevation: 102 m (335 ft)
- Highest elevation: 529 m (1,736 ft)
- Lowest elevation: 54 m (177 ft)

Population (2024 census)
  - Total: 40,144
  - Density: 190.98/km^{2} (494.64/sq mi)
  - Households: 9,891

Economy
  - Income class: 1st municipal income class
  - Poverty incidence: 11.34% (2023)
  - Revenue: ₱ 233.3 million (2024)
  - Assets: ₱ 395.3 million (2024)
  - Expenditure: ₱ 209.4 million (2024)
  - Liabilities: ₱ 107.4 million (2024)

Service provider
  - Electricity: Pangasinan 3 Electric Cooperative (PANELCO 3)
- Time zone: UTC+8 (PST)
- ZIP code: 2447
- PSGC: 0105536000
- IDD : area code: +63 (0)75
- Native languages: Pangasinan; Ilocano; Kallahan; Tagalog
- Website: https://sannicolaspangasinan.gov.ph

San Nicolas, officially the Municipality of San Nicolas (Pangasinan: Baley na San Nicolas; Ilocano: Ili ti San Nicolas; Tagalog: Bayan ng San Nicolas), is a landlocked municipality in the province of Pangasinan, Philippines. According to the 2024 census, it has a population of 40,144 people.

== History ==
=== Spanish Period ===
At the beginning of Spanish colonization in the late 16th century, indigenous settlements punctuated what is now San Nicolas. Among these communities were Ambayabang (Balungao), overseen by the legendary native chief Cayon Dagarag, Maliongliong (Mallilion), which accommodated the Dominican mission of San Jose in 1732, and Apsay (Agpay), which are all recorded in cartographic records dating as far back as 1625.

The development of San Nicolas into a settlement was marked by the establishment of religious missions by the Dominican and Augustinian orders in 1607. The Dominicans, who held sway in central Pangasinan, established the San Jose Mission in Maliongliong in 1732. Concurrently, the Augustinians, originating from Ytuy and Baler in the Pampanga River delta and Sierra Madre region, established the San Nicolas de Tolentino Mission in Ambayabang under the young Augustinian friar Agustin Barriocanal in the late 1730s to early 1740s.

==== Ilocano Migration ====
During the latter part of the 18th century and the beginning of the 19th century, there was a significant migration of Ilocano families to Pangasinan, driven by factors such as rapid population growth and limited land availability for habitation and cultivation. While Ilocano migration to San Nicolas likely began in the early to middle part of the 18th century, it was not until around 1800 that a substantial influx occurred. This led to the establishment of a settlement near the San Nicolas de Tolentino mission. This settlement grew rapidly, which led to the elevation of San Nicolas from a mission to a visita and then to a pueblo civil in 1810. Bernardo Alimorong was appointed as the first gobernadorcillo. In 1817, San Nicolas was transferred to the civil jurisdiction of Pangasinan. In 1818, the town held its first election, with Nicolas Patricio y Mejia becoming the first elected gobernadorcillo.

By the mid-nineteenth century, San Nicolas had developed significant infrastructure, including a state house, a schoolhouse, and a growing population. In 1845, San Nicolas sought to elevate its status from a pueblo visita to a pueblo parroco. Led by the governadorcillo Don Domingo Basilio, a petition for this change was submitted to the insular government in Manila. The petition received support from the alcalde mayor, the bishop of Nueva Segovia, and finance officials in Manila. Governor General Narciso Claveria y Zaldua issued a Royal Decree on June 18, 1846, officially separating San Nicolas from its mother parish of Tayug. This decree, marked San Nicolas's formal elevation to a "pueblo parroco" and, by extension, affirmed its status as a civil township. Don Mateo Miranda served as the incumbent governadorcillo at the time of the decree, with P. Jose Manso appointed as the first curate by the Dominican Province.

Despite its independence in ecclesiastical matters, San Nicolas continued to experience jurisdictional shifts between civil provinces. In 1851, along with Tayug, it was separated from Pangasinan and incorporated into the province of Nueva Ecija. This move was part of a larger plan by the Spanish government to create a new province, Nueva Cuenca, which ultimately did not materialize. San Nicolas's inclusion in Nueva Ecija was primarily based on its historical ecclesiastical ties to Tayug and its status as an Augustinian parish.

Efforts to return San Nicolas to Pangasinan's civil jurisdiction were pursued, culminating in a successful petition in 1863. Gobernadorcillos Don Raymundo Sumaguing of San Nicolas and Don Julio de Tolosa of Tayug spearheaded this endeavor, leading to San Nicolas's permanent inclusion in Pangasinan.

Famine struck the town in 1872, followed by epidemics of cholera epidemics in 1901 and 1902, smallpox in 1905; and Spanish flu in 1918 and 1919. The town's convent, schoolhouse and tribunal were burned down in the Philippine-American war of 1899, while devastating floods occurred in 1935.

=== Japanese Period ===
During the Second World War, the town became a base of operations for guerilla operations against Japanese forces. The Battle of Villa Verde Trail was fought between the Japanese Imperial Forces under the command of Lt. General Tomoyuki Yamashita and the US Army 127th Infantry Regiment, 32nd Infantry Division under the command of Maj. Gen William H. Gill, aided by Filipino guerillas and Igorots. The 32nd Infantry Division advanced along the Villaverde Trail beginning on January 30, 1945. Igorot laborers were employed to carry supplies and evacuate wounded as the rough terrain on the trail made it impossible for vehicles to enter. US forces achieved victory on January 26, 1945.

In 119 days of fighting, the 32nd lost 1,051 killed, 3,201 wounded and 14 missing - a total of 4,266 casualties. The division killed 9,000 Japanese soldiers and took 50 prisoners. A memorial for them was built at the Salacsac Pass.

== Geography ==
The Municipality of San Nicolas is located in north-eastern part of Pangasinan. It borders Tayug to the south, San Manuel to the west, Santa Fe to its northeast, Itogon to the north, and Natividad and Carranglan to its southeast.

San Nicolas is situated 71.32 kilometres (44.32 mi) from the provincial capital Lingayen, and 198.69 kilometres (123.46 mi) from the country's capital city of Manila.

=== Barangays ===
The Municipality of San Nicolas is politically subdivided into 33 barangays. (Note: This includes the disputed barangay Malico) Each barangay consists of puroks and some have sitios.

Out of the 33 barangays, only four are in urban area (Casaratan, Nagkaysa, Poblacion East, Poblacion West), the rest belongs to the rural areas.

- Bensican
- Cabitnongan
- Cabuloan
- Cacabugaoan
- Calanutian
- Calaocan
- Camangaan
- Camindoroan
- Casaratan
- Dalumpinas
- Fianza
- Lungao
- Malico (Note: Malico is subject to boundary dispute between the Municipalities of San Nicolas, Pangasinan and Santa Fe, Nueva Vizcaya (See Boundary Dispute))
- Malilion (Casantacruzan)
- Nagkaysa
- Nining
- Poblacion East
- Poblacion West
- Salingcob
- Salpad
- San Felipe East
- San Felipe West
- San Isidro
- San Jose
- San Rafael Centro
- San Rafael East
- San Rafael West
- San Roque
- Santa Maria East
- Santa Maria West
- Santo Tomas
- Siblot
- Sobol

=== Boundary dispute ===
San Nicolas currently has a boundary dispute with Santa Fe, Nueva Vizcaya over the territory of barangay Malico. The Nueva Vizcaya provincial board passed a resolution on September 21, 2022, urging San Nicolas officials to respect a memorandum of agreement between the National Mapping and Resource Information Authority (NAMRIA), Pangasinan, and Nueva Vizcaya about twenty years ago. On the same day, the Nueva Vizcaya provincial board held a special session in Malico and issued a resolution requesting San Nicolas officials to refrain from building infrastructure projects within the barangay's boundaries. It also instructed San Nicolas officials to "respect the boundary" of Santa Fe as well as "the rights of the Kalanguya tribe and their ancestral domain rights." Santa Fe cites RA 8686 as the law that created Malico as one of its barangays. Both municipalities in both provinces claim to have a barangay named Malico. The Pangasinan Provincial Board, in its first out-of-town session held in Malico on March 20, 2023, declared the said village as the "Barangay Summer Capital of Pangasinan" upon request by the municipal council through Resolution 88-2020 two years prior; a move that "strengthen the position and consolidate and reinforce the claim of barangay Malico as a territory of Pangasinan."

In July 2024, the Pangasinan provincial government has allocated ₱200 million (US$4.06 million) for projects and services in Malico. Governor Ramon Guico III asserted Malico's affiliation with Pangasinan, emphasizing the province's commitment to enhancing local infrastructure and services regardless of the territorial dispute. Nueva Vizcaya Governor Jose Gambito warns of potential legal repercussions for Pangasinan's investments in the area. He also said that the two government agreed to pay ₱600,000 (US$12,182.74) for every NAMRIA survey but Pangasinan allegedly did not fulfill its promises.

=== Climate ===
Climate data for San Nicolas, Pangasinan
| Month | Jan | Feb | Mar | Apr | May | Jun | Jul | Aug | Sep | Oct | Nov | Dec | Year |
|---|---|---|---|---|---|---|---|---|---|---|---|---|---|
| Mean daily maximum °C (°F) | 31 (88) | 31 (88) | 32 (90) | 34 (93) | 35 (95) | 34 (93) | 32 (90) | 32 (90) | 32 (90) | 32 (90) | 32 (90) | 31 (88) | 32 (90) |
| Mean daily minimum °C (°F) | 22 (72) | 22 (72) | 22 (72) | 24 (75) | 24 (75) | 24 (75) | 23 (73) | 23 (73) | 24 (75) | 23 (73) | 23 (73) | 22 (72) | 23 (73) |
| Average precipitation mm (inches) | 13.6 (0.54) | 10.4 (0.41) | 18.2 (0.72) | 15.7 (0.62) | 178.4 (7.02) | 227.9 (8.97) | 368 (14.5) | 306.6 (12.07) | 310.6 (12.23) | 215.7 (8.49) | 70.3 (2.77) | 31.1 (1.22) | 1,766.5 (69.56) |
| Average rainy days | 3 | 2 | 2 | 4 | 14 | 16 | 23 | 21 | 24 | 15 | 10 | 6 | 140 |
Source: World Weather Online

== Demographics ==
Population Census of San Nicolas
| Year | Pop. | ±% p.a. |
|---|---|---|
| 1903 | 9,780 | — |
| 1918 | 12,628 | +1.72% |
| 1939 | 16,088 | +1.16% |
| 1948 | 18,218 | +1.39% |
| 1960 | 19,080 | +0.39% |
| 1970 | 21,687 | +1.29% |
| 1975 | 23,377 | +1.52% |
| 1980 | 23,243 | −0.11% |
| 1990 | 27,415 | +1.66% |
| 1995 | 29,058 | +1.10% |
| 2000 | 31,418 | +1.69% |
| 2007 | 33,419 | +0.86% |
| 2010 | 34,108 | +0.75% |
| 2015 | 35,574 | +0.80% |
| 2020 | 39,778 | +2.38% |
| 2024 | 40,144 | +0.22% |
Source: Philippine Statistics Authority

== Economy ==
Poverty incidence of San Nicolas (%)

Source: Philippine Statistics Authority

== Government ==
=== Local government ===
San Nicolas is part of the sixth congressional district of the province of Pangasinan. It is governed by a mayor, designated as its local chief executive, and by a municipal council as its legislative body in accordance with the Local Government Code. The mayor, vice mayor, and the councilors are elected directly by the people through an election which is being held every three years.

=== Elected officials ===
Members of the Municipal Council (2025–2028)
| Position | Name |
|---|---|
| Congressman | Marlyn L. Primicias-Agabas |
| Governor | Ramon Guico III |
| Vice Governor | Mark Lambino |
| Board Members | Noel Bince |
| | Ranjit R. Shahani |
| Mayor | Alicia P. Enriquez |
| Vice-Mayor | Maricon Vindy A. Operaña |
| Councilors | Francisco O. Bravo Jr. |
| Councilors | Jairus Thom Dulay |
| Councilors | Amorsolo Pulido |
| Councilors | Rosewill P. Descargar-De Castro |
| Councilors | Pedrelito Bibat |
| Councilors | Jose M. Serquiña Jr. |
| Councilors | Reniel Ancheta |
| Councilors | Rene Jamandre |
| ABC President | Jason Ramirez |
| SK Federation President | Gian Jethro Manansala |
| IP Representative | Felixrey Lorenzo |

== Tourism ==
San Nicolas has many waterfalls from the Caraballo Mountains and rivers that serve as resting grounds for visitors.

Located at the upper part of the municipality, Barangay Malico is popular for its historical monuments from World War II such as the Sherman Tank, the barangay is also popular for its cold climate.

== Education ==
There are two schools district offices which govern all educational institutions within the municipality. The offices oversee the management and operations of all private and public, from primary to secondary schools. These are San Nicolas I Schools District Office, and San Nicolas II Schools District Office.

=== Primary and elementary schools ===
- Bangar Elementary School
- Bulangit Elementary School
- Cabitnongan Elementary School
- Cabuloan Elementary School
- Cacabugaoan Elementary School
- Calaocan Elementary School
- Camindoroan Elementary School
- Children's Learning Center
- Cristobal Rodrigo Elementary School
- Dalumpinas Elementary School
- East Central School
- Jesus is Lord Christian School Foundation
- Kabayabasan Elementary School
- Kulangew Elementary School
- Malico Elementary School
- Malilion Elementary School
- Nining Elementary School
- Pastoran Elementary School
- Puyao Elementary School
- Salpad Elementary School
- San Antonio East Elementary School
- San Antonio West Elementary School
- San Felipe Integrated School
- San Isidro Elementary School
- San Jose Elementary School
- San Rafael Elementary School
- San Roque ANP Pilot School
- Sapinit Elementary School
- Sobol Elementary School
- Sta. Maria Elementary School
- Sto. Tomas Elementary School
- Talingkapor Elementary School
- Villa Jose Elementary School
- West Central School SPED Center

=== Secondary schools ===
- Dalumpinas National High School
- Cacabugaoan National High School
- Malico National High School
- San Felipe Integrated School
- San Isidro National High School
- San Nicolas National High School
- San Rafael National High School
- Sta. Maria National High School
- Sto. Tomas National High School
