= Bataan–Cavite Interlink Bridge =

Proposed bridge in the Philippines

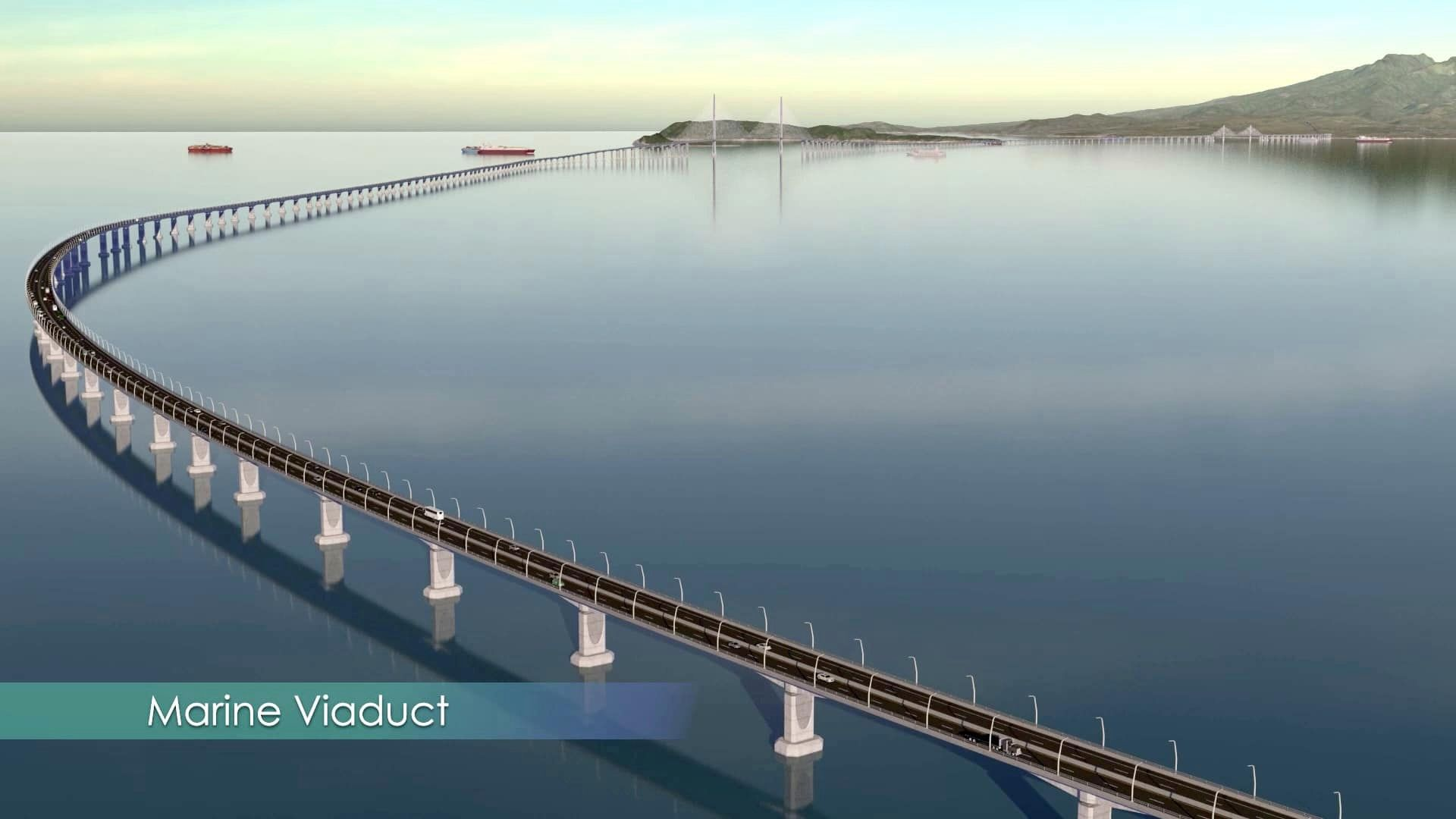
- Coordinates: 14°22′N 120°37′E
- Crosses: Manila Bay
- Locale: Mariveles in Bataan and Naic in Cavite
- Official name: Bataan–Cavite Interlink Bridge
- Other name(s): Trans Manila Bay Crossing; Manila Bay Bridge

Characteristics
- Total length: 32.15 km (19.98 mi)
- Traversable?: Yes
- Clearance below: 40.5 m (133 ft) (North Channel Bridge); 72.3 m (237 ft) (South Channel Bridge); 25 m (82 ft) (Nearshore Navigation Bridge)

History
- Construction start: 2025 (Planned)
- Construction end: 2029 (projected)
- Construction cost: ₱175.7 billion (2020 estimate)

Location
- Interactive map of Bataan–Cavite Interlink Bridge

The Bataan-Cavite Interlink Bridge, also known as the Manila Bay Bridge, is a planned bridge that will cross Manila Bay and connect the provinces of Bataan and Cavite in the Philippines. Construction was expected to begin in 2025.

== History ==
=== Background and early proposals ===
Bataan 1st district representative Felicito Payumo first proposed the construction of a bridge crossing Manila Bay in 1987, which he named as the "Trans Manila Bay Crossing".

As chairman of the Subic Bay Metropolitan Authority (SBMA), Payumo attempted to realize the Trans Manila Bay Crossing as a bridge–tunnel system in the early 2000s. At least two Japanese firms, Itochu and NKK presented feasibility studies for the bridge–tunnel link to the SBMA but such plans were never realized.

In 2016, Payumo revived the proposal again, pitching the bridge as means to decongest traffic in Metro Manila and boost the economy. Comparing the proposed bridge to the Tokyo Bay Aqua-Line, Payumo has noted that commuters in Cavite and other parts of Southern Luzon do not need to pass through Metro Manila to reach Central Luzon if such bridge would be built.

The China State Construction Engineering Corporation (CSCEC) began its onsite study as preparation for the possible construction of the bridge in late 2017. Its team first visited the coastal towns in Bataan.

=== Approval ===
The National Economic and Development Authority (NEDA) approved the bridge project in early 2020 with a budget of ₱175.7 billion. The implementation of the bridge project is projected to last six years.

In October 2020, the Department of Public Works and Highways (DPWH) signed a $59 million engineering design contract, awarded to the joint venture of T. Y. Lin International from the US and Korea's Pyunghwa Engineering Consultants Ltd., who are working in tandem with Geneva-based Renardet S.A. and local firm DCCD Engineering Corporation.

By March 2023, the project's detailed engineering design was already 70% complete, according to the DPWH. The construction of the bridge was targeted to start in 2024 before being moved to 2025.

=== Construction ===
The Bataan–Cavite Interlink Bridge, envisioned to be one of the world's longest marine bridges, is estimated to cost $3.91 billion to construct. The amount is set to be bankrolled through a multi-tranche financing scheme under which $2.1 billion will be financed by the Asian Development Bank (ADB) while $1.14 billion will be co-financed by the Asian Infrastructure Investment Bank (AIIB). The remaining $664.23 million will be funded by the Philippine government.

On December 12, 2023, the ADB announced it has approved the $2.1 billion funding it promised for the construction of this bridge. On December 15 of the same year, the Philippine government, through the Department of Finance (DOF), and the ADB signed the first tranche of the financing for this project, worth $650 million of the total $2.1 billion loan package. On the other hand, AIIB announced that their share of first tranche funding, worth $350 million, will be available to the Philippine government by January 2024.

On May 22, 2024, AIIB announced that the loan for the bridge was approved, with a total cost of US$1.14 billion.

Construction was projected to start around 2024. The bidding process for the first package is set to begin in January 2024. Construction of the bridge is estimated to take five years to complete.

The detailed engineering design of the mega bridge project and the bidding of the initial contract package has been completed and is planned to be funded through an official development assistance (ODA). The construction's planned starting schedule has been moved to early or mid 2025.

In February 2026, the DPWH recommended awarding the ₱3.07-billion contract package 2 for the BCIB project to a consortium led by China Wu Yi Co. Ltd. In July of that year, Secretary Vince Dizon stated that key contracts for the bridge would be awarded "very soon".

== Specifications ==
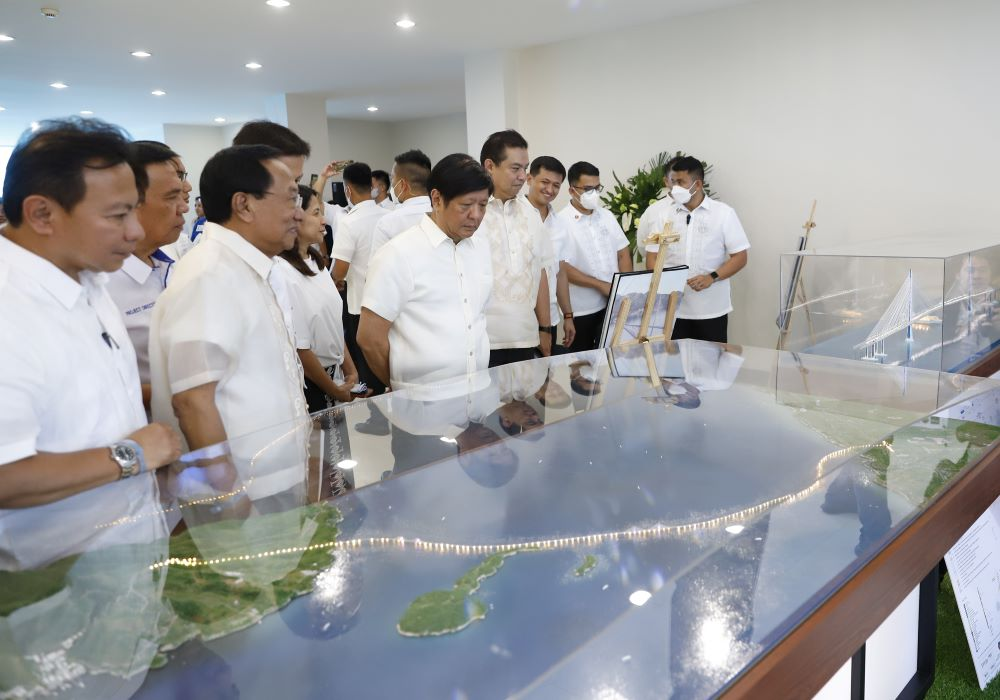
President Bongbong Marcos along with other officials inspecting a model of the bridge in the BCIB milestones ceremony in March 2023

The Bataan–Cavite Interlink Bridge will span approximately 32.15 km (19.98 mi) in total length, of which around 26 km (16 mi) will traverse the waters of Manila Bay. The four-lane, dual carriageway bridge system will connect Barangay Alas-asin in Mariveles, Bataan, to Barangay Timalan Balsahan in Naic, Cavite.

The project includes two main cable-stayed bridges—the North Channel Bridge and the South Channel Bridge—along with 23.5 km (14.6 mi) of marine viaducts, a minor nearshore navigation bridge, and approach roads on both ends. A turnaround interchange is planned near Corregidor Island, and a future connection to the island has been considered, though it is not included in the bridge project.

The North Channel Bridge will span a 300 m (980 ft) wide shipping lane between the Bataan coast and Corregidor Island. It will feature two 142 m (466 ft) tall towers, a main span of 400 m (1,300 ft), and a vertical clearance of 40.5 m (133 ft) to accommodate maritime traffic. The South Channel Bridge, considerably larger, will cross the 750 m (2,460 ft) wide deep-water channel between Caballo Island and the Cavite shoreline. It will include two 304 m (997 ft) tall towers, a main span of 900 m (3,000 ft), and provide 72.3 m (237 ft) of vertical clearance.

In addition, a 315 m (1,033 ft) long nearshore navigation bridge will be constructed closer to the Cavite coast, with a 150 m (490 ft) clear span and 25 m (82 ft) of clearance, enabling passage for Philippine Coast Guard vessels and large fishing boats through a newly established 90 m (300 ft) wide navigation channel.

The marine viaduct segments will maintain a standard elevation of 21 m (69 ft) above sea level, with 100 m (330 ft) spans in deeper waters and 60 m (200 ft) spans in shallower areas, ensuring unrestricted access for small fishing vessels and traditional boats. A vehicle turnaround interchange supported by piles will be located near Corregidor Island to provide emergency access and traffic management flexibility.

The Bataan approach road will be approximately 5.9 km (3.7 mi) long, beginning near the Mariveles Freeport Area and connecting to the Roman Superhighway via a trumpet interchange. It will include two underpasses for local access, a 100 m (330 ft) bridge over a gully, and transition to a coastal viaduct approximately 200 m (660 ft) inland. A Bridge Monitoring and Maintenance Compound will be built along this segment and will be serve for bridge's maintenance and support.

On the Cavite side, the approach road will extend for about 1.3 km (0.81 mi), terminating at a partial cloverleaf interchange with the Antero Soriano Highway. Provisions have been included for a potential future link to the Cavite–Laguna Expressway
