= Candaba Viaduct =

Bridge in Pampanga and Bulacan, Philippines

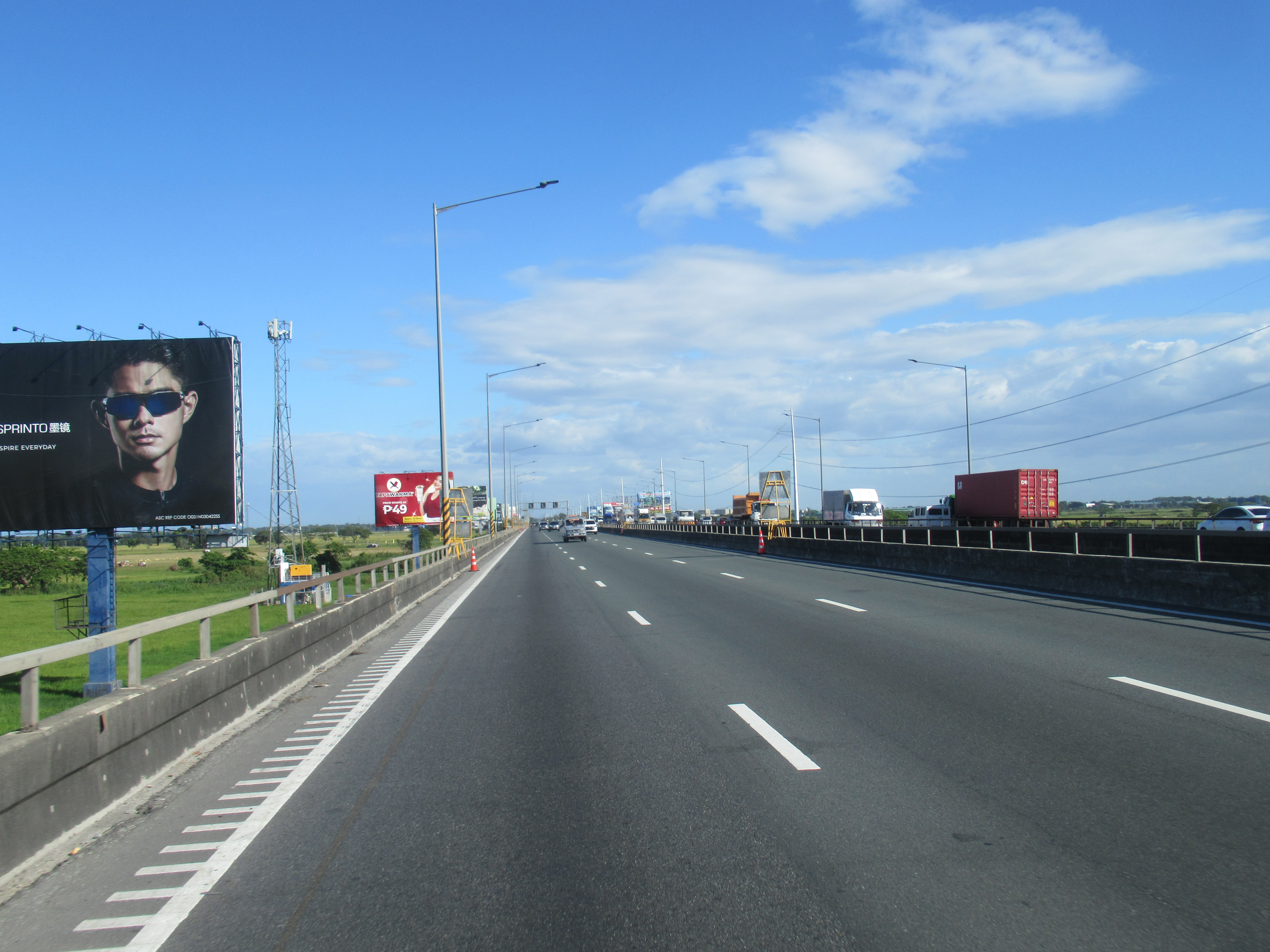
- The viaduct in 2022 before the construction of the third viaduct
- Coordinates: 14°57′15″N 120°46′36″E
- Carries: 9 lanes of AH26 (North Luzon Expressway)
- Crosses: Candaba Swamp; Pampanga River
- Locale: Apalit, Pampanga; Calumpit, Bulacan; Pulilan, Bulacan
- Official name: Candaba Viaduct
- Other name(s): Pulilan–Apalit Bridge; Candaba Pampanga Viaduct (STA 46+938 – 52+188)
- Maintained by: NLEX Corporation (Tollways Management Corporation)

Characteristics
- Design: Viaduct
- Material: Concrete, asphalt
- Total length: 5 km (3.1 mi)
- Width: 12 m (39 ft) per direction
- Height: 15 m (49 ft 3 in)
- Clearance below: 6.1 m (20 ft)
- No. of lanes: Nine-lane triple carriageway (3 carriageways × 3 lanes)

History
- Designer: Aas-Jakobsen
- Engineering design by: Norconsult
- Constructed by: Construction and Development Corporation of the Philippines (original bridges); First Balfour (emergency lay-by bays and median crossovers); Leighton Asia (third bridge)
- Construction start: April 1974
- Opened: May 17, 1977; 49 years ago

Statistics
- Toll: See NLEX toll matrix

Location
- Interactive map of Candaba Viaduct

The Candaba Viaduct, also known as the Pulilan–Apalit Bridge and the Candaba Pampanga Viaduct, is a 5-kilometer (3.1 mi) viaduct carrying the North Luzon Expressway (NLEX) across the Candaba Swamp in the provinces of Pampanga and Bulacan, Philippines. It consists of nine lanes, with three northbound and six southbound. Upon its opening in 1977, it was the longest bridge in the Philippines, a distinction it held until 2021, when it was surpassed by the 8.9-kilometer (5.5 mi) Cebu–Cordova Link Expressway (CCLEX). It is currently the second-longest bridge in the country. The viaduct was designed by Aas-Jakobsen and built by Construction Development Corporation of the Philippines (CDCP) as part of the construction of the NLEX.

The viaduct is elevated approximately 20 feet (6.1 m) above the Candaba Swamp and Pampanga River, allowing the NLEX to remain open to traffic when the swamp floods during the rainy or monsoon season. Its elevation is approximately the same as the current elevation of Bacolor, Pampanga, which was raised by lahar deposits following the 1991 eruption of Mount Pinatubo between 1991 and 1995.

The viaduct is equipped with lighting, emergency callboxes, and CCTVs powered by solar panels, as installing power lines along the viaduct is difficult.

== Route description ==
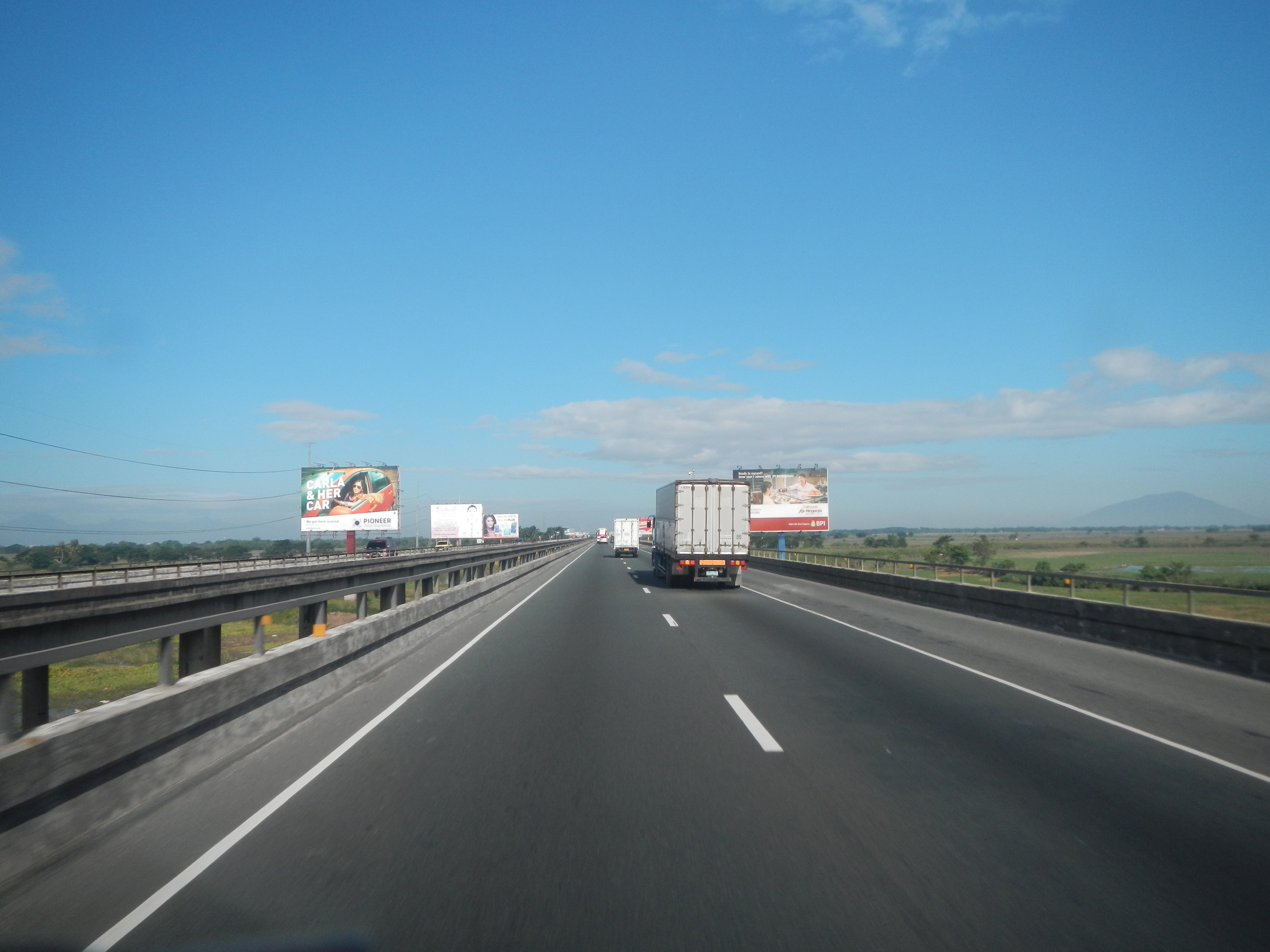
Candaba Viaduct before the 2016–2017 expansion

The Candaba Viaduct crosses the Candaba Swamp and Pampanga River, connecting Pampanga and Bulacan. Most of the surrounding area consists of rice paddies, trees, and roadside billboards.

The viaduct begins in Dulong Malabon, Pulilan, Bulacan, where several houses are located beneath it, before entering Calumpit. It then enters Apalit, Pampanga with the provincial boundary is marked by a power line wire located between lattice tower 267 and steel pole 268 of relocated San Simon–Pulilan section of Hermosa–Duhat–Balintawak Transmission Line of National Grid Corporation of the Philippines (NGCP) at an area with palm trees farther from the viaduct. The viaduct continues on a straight direction before crossing Apalit Bypass Road, the Pampanga River, and Dr. Joaquin Gonzalez Avenue where it ends, with the two aforementioned roads have no direct access into it. The Apalit Church and town proper are visible from the viaduct.

== History ==
In 1974, construction began on the 50-kilometer (31 mi) Manila North Expressway Extension. The Candaba Viaduct was constructed in 1977 as part of the project and initially consisted of a single bridge. The project was financed by the International Bank for Reconstruction and Development and constructed under the direction of the Ministry of Public Highways. Through Presidential Decree No. 1113, President Ferdinand Marcos granted the Construction Development Corporation of the Philippines (CDCP) a franchise to maintain and operate the expressway, including the Candaba Viaduct. The second bridge opened to motorists in 1978.

The operations and maintenance of the NLEX, including the Candaba Viaduct, were transferred to NLEX Corporation on February 10, 2005.

From 2016 to 2017, the Candaba Viaduct was expanded, adding a third lane in each direction. First Balfour undertook the construction of emergency lay-by bays and a 320-meter (1,050 ft) median crossover.

In February 2023, Leighton Asia was awarded the ₱7.89-billion construction contract for a third viaduct. Construction of the 5.3-kilometer (3.3 mi) Third Candaba Viaduct began in April 2023. The new viaduct was located between the existing northbound and southbound bridges and was intended to carry part of the traffic load from the existing bridges. It also included an intersection with the Apalit Bypass Road and was initially expected to be completed in 2024.

By February 2024, construction of the Third Candaba Viaduct was 50% complete. The project reached this milestone following the installation of its first girder, marking the transition from heavy groundwork construction to road-level work. The president and general manager of NLEX Corporation, Jose Luigi L. Bautista, also signed a ₱10-billion loan agreement with the Bank of the Philippine Islands (BPI) to fund the project's completion.

The Third Candaba Viaduct opened to traffic in segments in 2024, with Pulilan Zone 1 opening in August, Apalit Zone 2 in October, and Apalit Zone 3 in December. On December 10, President Bongbong Marcos, together with Manny Pangilinan and Speaker Martin Romualdez, led the inauguration and opening ceremony of the Third Candaba Viaduct at BigBen Farm, North Polo Club's Barn Events in Tabon, Pulilan. Following the opening, the existing southbound bridge was temporarily closed as traffic was transferred to the new viaduct.

Construction of the Third Candaba Viaduct

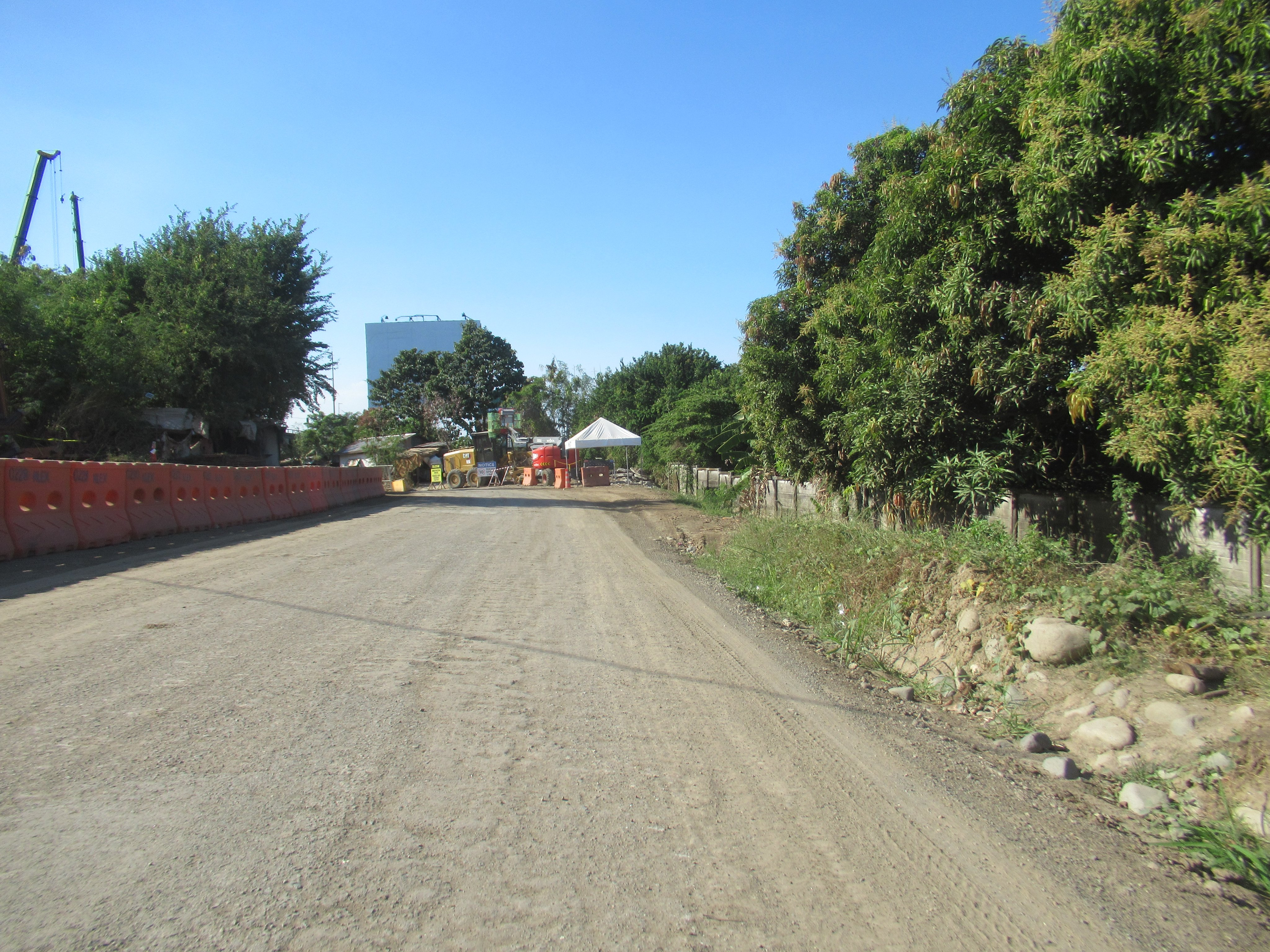
Pulilan NLEX access road

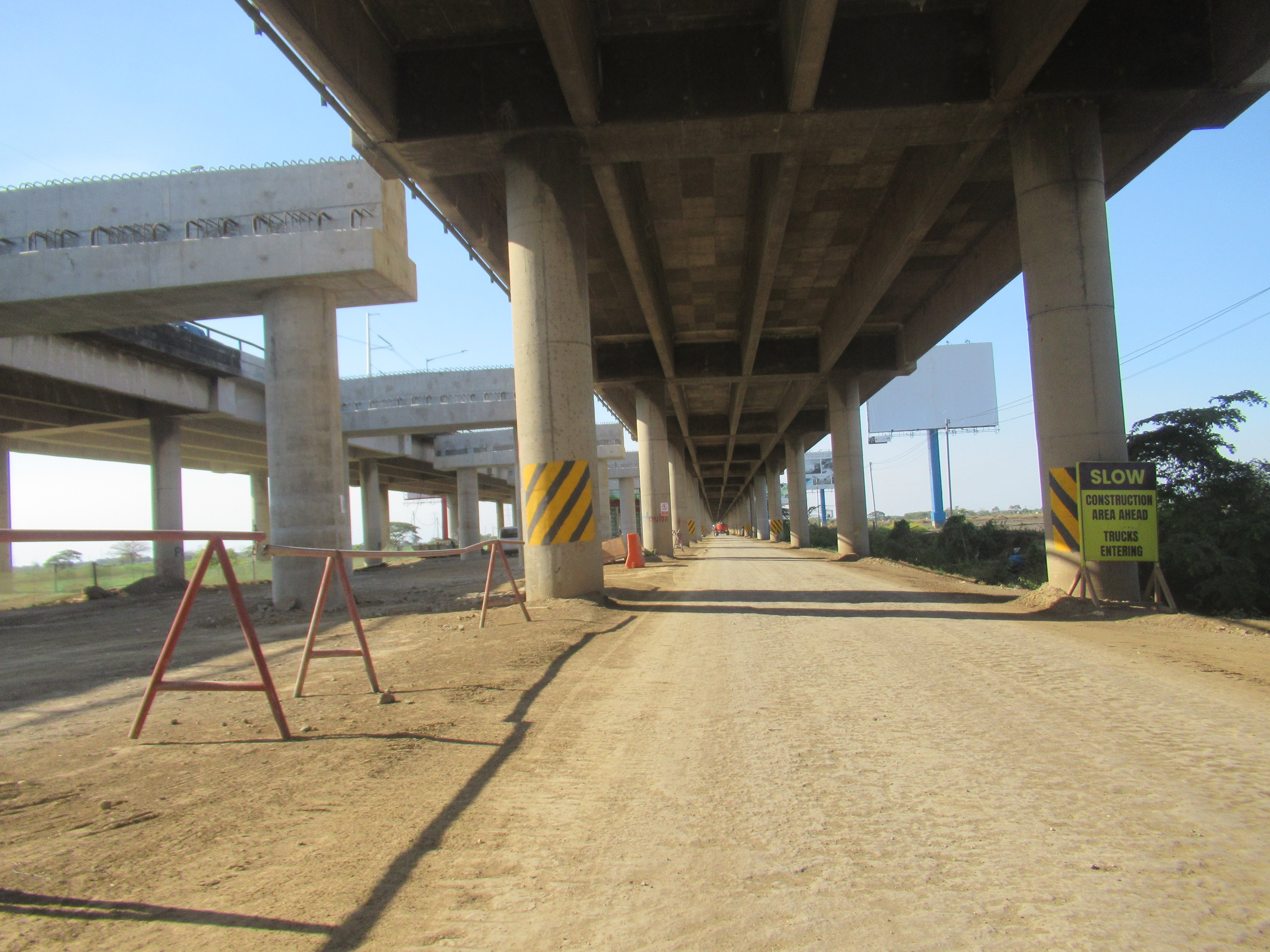
Third Candaba Viaduct in February 2024

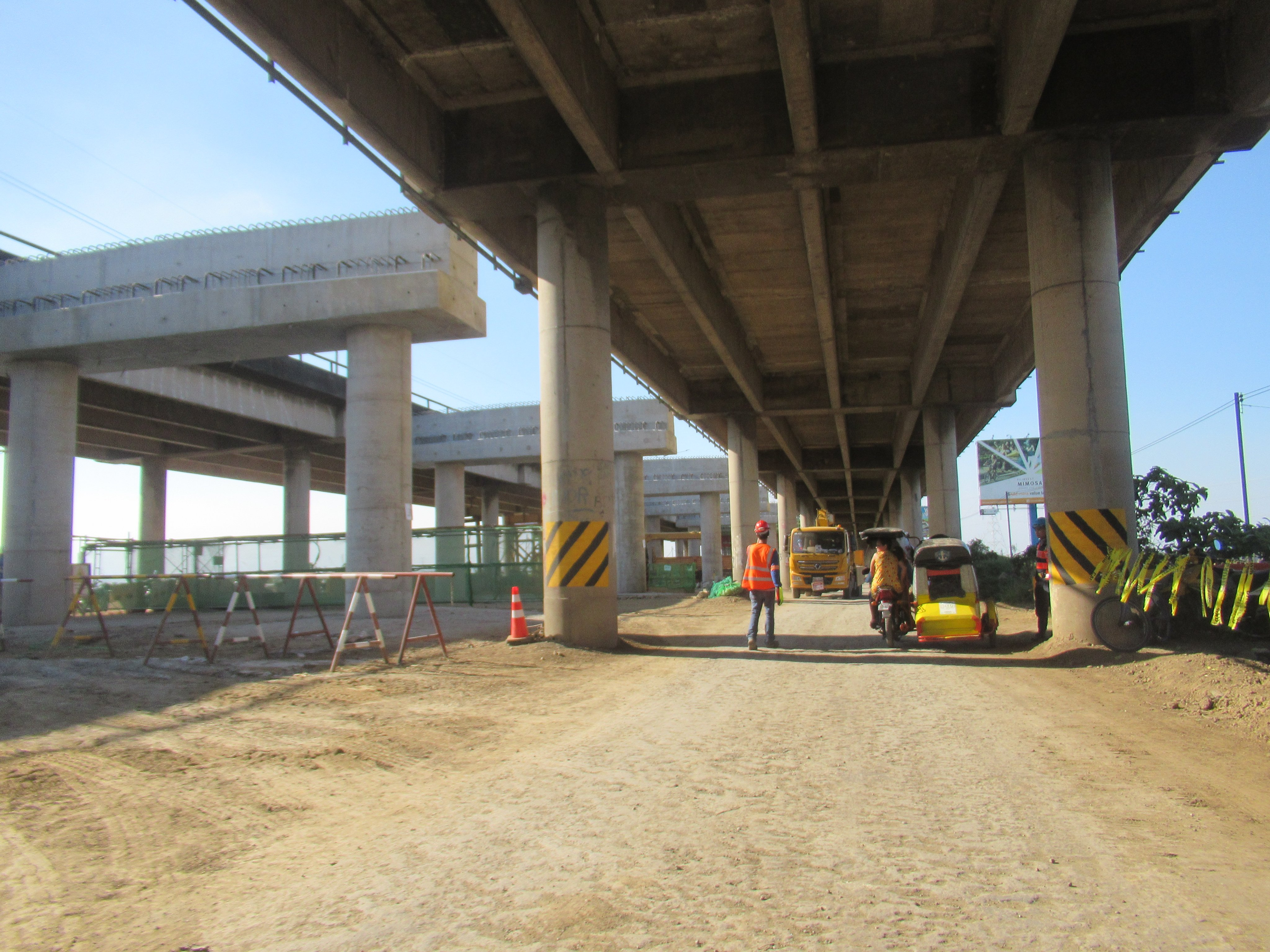
Bored piles, columns, crossheads and girders

== In popular culture ==
The Candaba Viaduct is referenced in a popular joke: "Mula sa kabila, itlog. Pagtawid naging 'ibon' na sa haba ng tulay" (transl. "From the other end, it was still an egg. Upon reaching the other end, it had become a 'bird' because of the length of the bridge"). The joke is based on the similarity between the Kapampangan word ebun, meaning "egg", and the Tagalog word ibon, meaning "bird".

The viaduct was one of the key locations in the Philippine action TV series FPJ's Batang Quiapo on several occasions throughout the show.

== See also ==
- List of bridges in the Philippines
