= Cansaga Bay Bridge =

Bridge in Cebu, Philippines

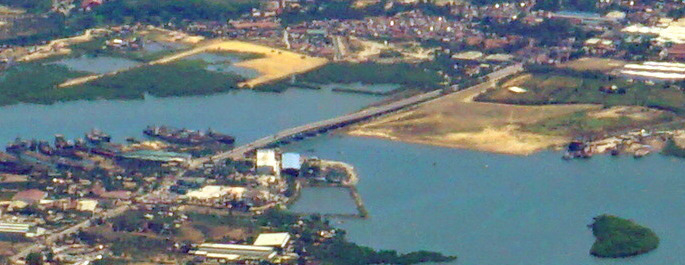
- Coordinates: 10°20′58″N 123°58′07″E
- Crosses: Cansaga Bay
- Locale: Mandaue and Consolacion, Cebu

Characteristics
- Total length: 1,250.65 m (4,103.2 ft)
- Longest span: 640.3 m (2,101 ft)
- No. of spans: 3

History
- Constructed by: Ciriaco Construction
- Construction start: December 10, 2008
- Construction cost: ₱2.3 billion
- Opened: January 24, 2010

Statistics
- Toll: No

The Cansaga Bay Bridge is a road bridge which links Mandaue and Consolacion in Cebu.

== History ==
The bridge was built as a response to the often congested traffic situation at the North Road Highway, which connects the city of Mandaue to Cebu's northern towns. The Cansaga Bay Bridge was flagship infrastructure project of the administration of then President Gloria Macapagal Arroyo who featured the bridge in her State of the Nation Address in 2008. Arroyo personally visited the site shortly after the presidential speech. Construction of the ₱2 billion bridge began on December 10, 2008. The bridge project was the first phase of the North Coastal Road Project. Manila-based firm Ciriaco Construction was involved in the bridge's construction.

The Cansaga Bay Bridge's construction was delayed several times and was supposed to be completed by August 2009. The bridge was inaugurated on January 24, 2010.

== Structure ==
The Cansaga Bay Bridge has a total length of 1,250.65 meters (4,103.2 ft) and consist of three main components; the main span which measures 640.3 meters (2,101 ft), the first road approach which is 428.75 meters (1,406.7 ft) long, and the second road approach which has a length of 181.60 meters (595.8 ft). The bridge has four lanes.
