= Pangasinan's 6th congressional district =

Legislative district of the Philippines

- Constituency for the House of Representatives of the Philippines
- Boundary of Pangasinan's 6th congressional district in Pangasinan

- Location of Pangasinan within the Philippines
- Province: Pangasinan
- Region: Ilocos Region
- Population: 464,861 (2020)
- Electorate: 316,097 (2022)
- Major settlements: 10 LGUs: Municipalities; Asingan; Balungao; Natividad; Rosales; San Manuel; San Nicolas; San Quintin; Santa Maria; Tayug; Umingan
- Area: 1,175.09 km^{2} (453.70 sq mi)

Current constituency
- Created: 1987
- Representative: Marlyn Primicias-Agabas
- Political party: Lakas
- Congressional bloc: Majority

Pangasinan's 6th congressional district is one of the six congressional districts of the Philippines in the province of Pangasinan. It has been represented in the House of Representatives of the Philippines since 1987. The district consists of the eastern municipalities of Asingan, Balungao, Natividad, Rosales, San Manuel, San Nicolas, San Quintin, Santa Maria, Tayug, and Umingan. It is currently represented in the 20th Congress by Marlyn Primicias-Agabas of the Lakas–CMD (Lakas).

== Representation history ==
#	Image	Member	Term of office		Congress	Party	Electoral history	Constituent LGUs
#	Image	Member	Start	End	Congress	Party	Electoral history	Constituent LGUs
District created February 2, 1987.
1		Conrado Estrella III	June 30, 1987	June 30, 1995	8th	KBL	Elected in 1987.	1987–present: Asingan, Balungao, Natividad, Rosales, San Manuel, San Nicolas, San Quintin, Santa Maria, Tayug, Umingan
1		Conrado Estrella III	June 30, 1987	June 30, 1995	9th	NPC	Re-elected in 1992.	1987–present: Asingan, Balungao, Natividad, Rosales, San Manuel, San Nicolas, San Quintin, Santa Maria, Tayug, Umingan
2		Ranjit R. Shahani	June 30, 1995	June 30, 2001	10th	Lakas	Elected in 1995.	1987–present: Asingan, Balungao, Natividad, Rosales, San Manuel, San Nicolas, San Quintin, Santa Maria, Tayug, Umingan
2		Ranjit R. Shahani	June 30, 1995	June 30, 2001	11th	Lakas	Re-elected in 1998.	1987–present: Asingan, Balungao, Natividad, Rosales, San Manuel, San Nicolas, San Quintin, Santa Maria, Tayug, Umingan
(1)		Conrado Estrella III	June 30, 2001	June 30, 2010	12th	NPC	Elected in 2001.	1987–present: Asingan, Balungao, Natividad, Rosales, San Manuel, San Nicolas, San Quintin, Santa Maria, Tayug, Umingan
(1)		Conrado Estrella III	June 30, 2001	June 30, 2010	13th	NPC	Re-elected in 2004.	1987–present: Asingan, Balungao, Natividad, Rosales, San Manuel, San Nicolas, San Quintin, Santa Maria, Tayug, Umingan
(1)		Conrado Estrella III	June 30, 2001	June 30, 2010	14th	NPC	Re-elected in 2007.	1987–present: Asingan, Balungao, Natividad, Rosales, San Manuel, San Nicolas, San Quintin, Santa Maria, Tayug, Umingan
3		Marlyn L. Primicias-Agabas	June 30, 2010	June 30, 2019	15th	NPC	Elected in 2010.	1987–present: Asingan, Balungao, Natividad, Rosales, San Manuel, San Nicolas, San Quintin, Santa Maria, Tayug, Umingan
3		Marlyn L. Primicias-Agabas	June 30, 2010	June 30, 2019	16th	NPC	Re-elected in 2013.	1987–present: Asingan, Balungao, Natividad, Rosales, San Manuel, San Nicolas, San Quintin, Santa Maria, Tayug, Umingan
3		Marlyn L. Primicias-Agabas	June 30, 2010	June 30, 2019	17th	NPC	Re-elected in 2016.	1987–present: Asingan, Balungao, Natividad, Rosales, San Manuel, San Nicolas, San Quintin, Santa Maria, Tayug, Umingan
4		Tyrone D. Agabas	June 30, 2019	June 30, 2022	18th	NPC	Elected in 2019.	1987–present: Asingan, Balungao, Natividad, Rosales, San Manuel, San Nicolas, San Quintin, Santa Maria, Tayug, Umingan
(3)		Marlyn L. Primicias-Agabas	June 30, 2022	Incumbent	19th	PDP–Laban	Elected in 2022.	1987–present: Asingan, Balungao, Natividad, Rosales, San Manuel, San Nicolas, San Quintin, Santa Maria, Tayug, Umingan
(3)		Marlyn L. Primicias-Agabas	June 30, 2022	Incumbent	19th	PFP	Elected in 2022.	1987–present: Asingan, Balungao, Natividad, Rosales, San Manuel, San Nicolas, San Quintin, Santa Maria, Tayug, Umingan
(3)		Marlyn L. Primicias-Agabas	June 30, 2022	Incumbent	20th	Lakas	Re-elected in 2025.	1987–present: Asingan, Balungao, Natividad, Rosales, San Manuel, San Nicolas, San Quintin, Santa Maria, Tayug, Umingan

== Election results ==
=== 2025 ===
Candidate	Party	Votes	%
Marlyn Primicias-Agabas (incumbent)	Lakas–CMD	168,185	58.96
Gilbert Estrella	Nationalist People's Coalition	117,045	41.04
Total		285,230	100.00
Valid votes		285,230	98.06
Invalid/blank votes		5,655	1.94
Total votes		290,885	100.00
Registered voters/turnout		325,359	89.40
Lakas–CMD hold			
Source: Commission on Elections

=== 2022 ===
2022 Philippine House of Representatives elections
Party	Candidate	Votes	%
PDP–Laban	Marilyn "Len" Primicias-Agabas	231,864	
KBL	Pilo Villamar	18,286	
Total votes		250,150	
PDP–Laban gain from NPC			

=== 2019 ===
2019 Philippine House of Representatives elections
Party	Candidate	Votes	%
NPC	Tyrone Agabas	202,978	
Independent	Myrna Custodio	13,568	
Total votes		216,546	
NPC hold			

=== 2016 ===
2016 Philippine House of Representatives elections
Party	Candidate	Votes	%
NPC	Marlyn Primicias-Agabas	183,175	
Invalid or blank votes		45,643	
Total votes		228,818	
NPC hold			

=== 2013 ===
2013 Philippine House of Representatives elections
Party	Candidate	Votes	%
NPC	Marlyn Primicias-Agabas	161,362	76.00
Invalid or blank votes		50,937	24
Total votes		212,299	100.00
NPC hold			

=== 2010 ===
2010 Philippine House of Representatives elections
Party	Candidate	Votes	%
NPC	Marlyn Primicias-Agabas	114,523	57.24
Lakas–Kampi	Hermogenes Esperon	85,069	42.52
PMP	Eduardo Libatique	487	0.24
Valid ballots		200,079	97.78
Invalid or blank votes		4,544	2.22
Total votes		204,623	100.00
NPC hold			

== See also ==
- Legislative districts of Pangasinan
