= China Wu Yi =

Construction and engineering company

China Wu Yi Co., Ltd.
- Native name: 中国武夷
- Company type: State-owned enterprise
- Headquarters: Fuzhou, China
- Website: Official website

China Wu Yi Co., Ltd. is a construction and engineering company that carries out international projects as the overseas arm of the Fujian Construction Engineering Group Company. It reported $334 million in international project work in 2012, placing the company among the 250 largest international contractors as ranked by Engineering News-Record.

== Projects ==
A 2013 report noted it had 18 projects in Kenya. The Kenyan operations of the company is one of the six largest Chinese construction companies in Kenya, competing in a highly competitive market with each other and local and European construction companies.

One of the key projects Wu Yi was selected, in September 2006 for, was the $37.2 million first phase of the $1.23 billion modernization of the Jomo Kenyatta International Airport, funded by a syndicate of Kenyan banks and the World Bank. The company is a contractor in paving the first phase of a road between the border Kenya-Ethiopia border town of Moyale and Isiolo, a northern Kenyan gateway city in a project worth $63.9 million, funded by the African Development Bank. A Reuters article documenting the project noted there was a pan-African significance to the project as it would lay down tarmac on one of the last unpaved sections of the Cairo – Cape Town Highway.

In another important project, it was one of several Chinese contractors that built the Thika superhighway, a project that involved widening an existing road that had one lane on one side and two lanes on the other to 12 lanes total. The $360 million project financed by the Export-Import Bank of China was finished in 2012 on schedule.

A scholarly article in 2008 on Kenyan and Chinese economic relations, published by the Center for Strategic and International Studies, praised the work of the company in Kenya.
