= Marlyn Primicias-Agabas =

Filipino lawyer and politician (born 1969)

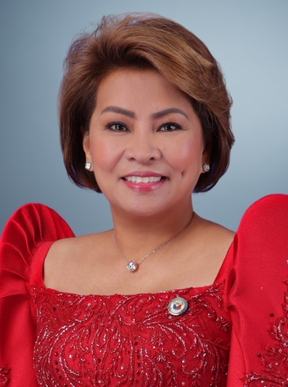
- Official portrait, 2025

Deputy Majority Leader of the House of Representatives of the Philippines
- Incumbent
- Assumed office July 29, 2025 Serving with several others
- House Speaker: Martin Romualdez; Bojie Dy

Member of the House of Representatives from Pangasinan’s 6th District
- Incumbent
- Assumed office June 30, 2022
- Preceded by: Tyrone Agabas
- In office June 30, 2010 – June 30, 2019
- Preceded by: Conrado Estrella III
- Succeeded by: Tyrone Agabas

Vice Governor of Pangasinan
- In office June 30, 2007 – June 30, 2010
- Governor: Amado Espino Jr.
- Preceded by: Oscar Lambino
- Succeeded by: Jose Calimlim Jr.

Member of the Pangasinan Provincial Board from the 6th District
- In office June 30, 1998 – June 30, 2007

Member of the San Nicolas Municipal Council
- In office June 30, 1992 – June 30, 1995

Personal details
- Born: Marlyn Legaspi Primicias; July 23, 1969 (age 57) Tayug, Pangasinan, Philippines
- Party: Lakas (until 2009; 2024–present)
- Other political affiliations: PFP (2023–2024); PDP–Laban (2021–2023); NPC (2009–2021); KAMPI (2007–2008)
- Spouse: Tyrone Agabas
- Education: University of Santo Tomas (BS); San Beda College (LLB); National Defense College of the Philippines (MNSA)
- Occupation: Politician, lawyer

Marlyn "Len" Primicias-Agabas (born Marlyn Legaspi Primicias; July 23, 1969) is a Filipino lawyer and politician. She is currently representing the 6th District of Pangasinan in the House of Representatives of the Philippines since 2022, a position she previously held from 2010 to 2019. She served as vice governor of Pangasinan from 2007 to 2010.

== Early life and education ==
Primicias was born on July 23, 1969, in Tayug, to Alejandro Primicias Jr. and Zenaida Legaspi. She studied Bachelor of Science in Commerce at the University of Santo Tomas. She took up law at the San Beda College. In 1997, Primicias passed the bar examination. She obtained a master's degree in National Security Administration from the National Defense College of the Philippines.

== Political career ==
In 1992, Primicias became a councilor of San Nicolas until 1995.

In 1998, Primicias was elected as member of Pangasinan Provincial Board for three consecutive terms.

In 2007, Primicias was elected as vice governor of Pangasinan until 2010.

In 2010, Primicias was elected as representative of the sixth district of Pangasinan for three consecutive terms.

In 2022, Primicias returned as representative of the sixth district of Pangasinan after she succeeded her husband.

== Personal life ==
Primicias is married to Tyrone Agabas, also a representative of the sixth district of Pangasinan from 2019 to 2022.

Her grandfather, Cipriano Primicias Sr., served as Senator of the Philippines from 1951 to 1963.

== See also ==
- List of female members of the House of Representatives of the Philippines
