= Santa Maria, Pangasinan =

Municipality in Pangasinan, Philippines

Santa Maria
- Municipality
- Municipality of Santa Maria
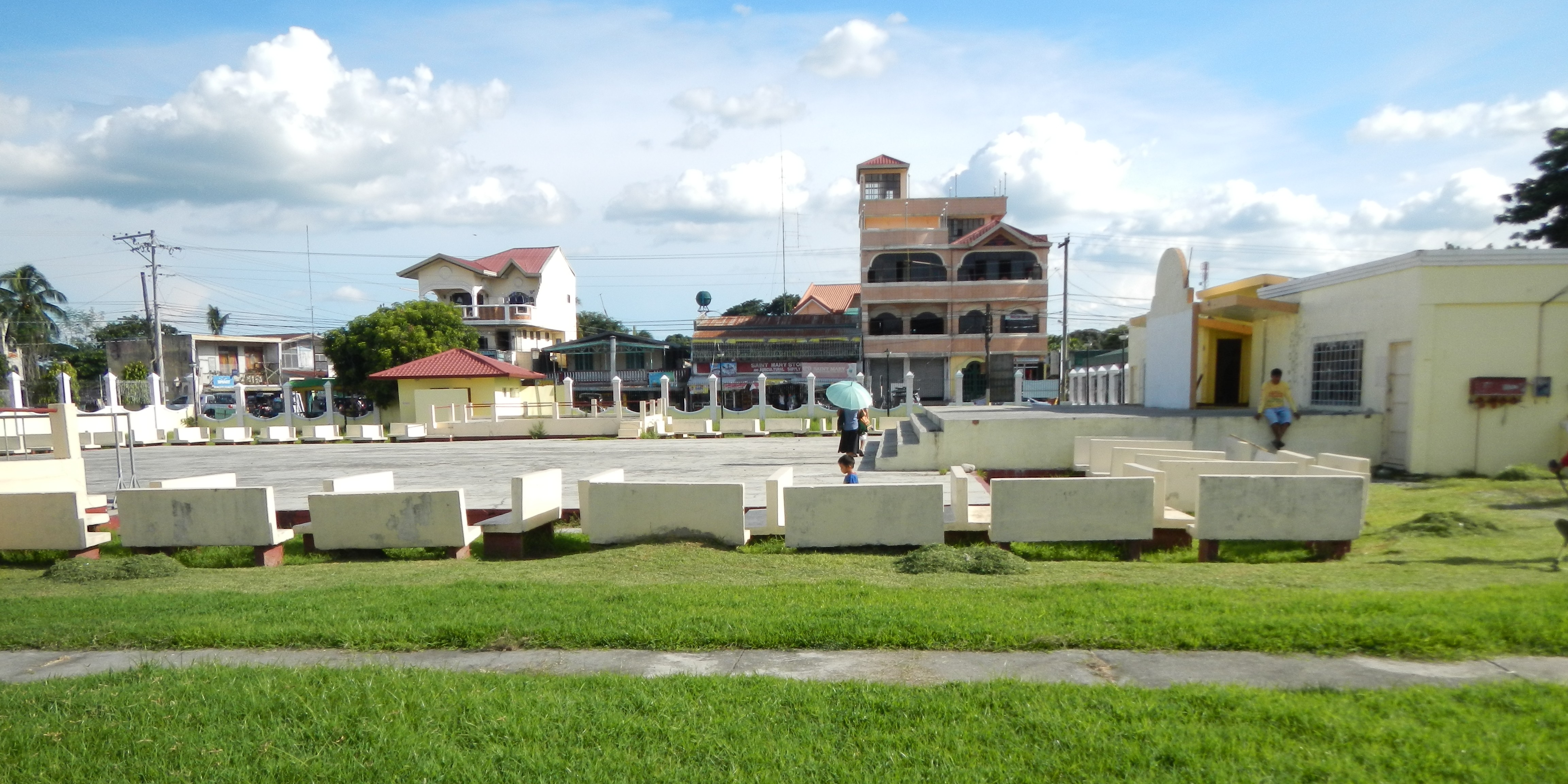
- Municipal plaza

- Seal

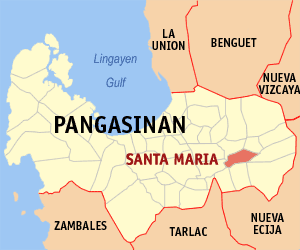
- Map of Pangasinan with Santa Maria highlighted
- Interactive map of Santa Maria
- Location within the Philippines
- Coordinates: 15°58′51″N 120°42′01″E
- Country: Philippines
- Region: Ilocos Region
- Province: Pangasinan
- District: 6th district
- Founded: January 10, 1855
- Annexation to Tayug: October 8, 1903
- Chartered: October 31, 1906
- Named for: Mary, mother of Jesus
- Barangays: 23 (see Barangays)

Government
  - Type: Sangguniang Bayan
  - Mayor: Julius C. Ramos
  - Vice Mayor: Teodoro A. Ramos
  - Representative: Marlyn P. Agabas
  - Municipal Council: Members: Rex R. Navarrete; Noela L. Agpawa; Arnel B. Ginez; Felicisima D. Agpawa; Reynaldo D. Segui Jr.; Pedro A. Tugade Jr.; Justino Dominador C. Rodriguez Jr.; Rolando R. dela Peña
  - Electorate: 24,026 voters (2025)

Area
  - Total: 69.50 km^{2} (26.83 sq mi)
- Elevation: 45 m (148 ft)
- Highest elevation: 68 m (223 ft)
- Lowest elevation: 32 m (105 ft)

Population (2024 census)
  - Total: 34,452
  - Density: 495.7/km^{2} (1,284/sq mi)
  - Households: 8,249

Economy
  - Income class: 2nd municipal income class
  - Poverty incidence: 9.25% (2023)
  - Revenue: ₱ 169.3 million (2024)
  - Assets: ₱ 595.9 million (2024)
  - Expenditure: ₱ 178 million (2024)
  - Liabilities: ₱ 214.4 million (2024)

Service provider
  - Electricity: Dagupan Electric Corporation (DECORP)
- Time zone: UTC+8 (PST)
- ZIP code: 2440
- PSGC: 0105539000
- IDD : area code: +63 (0)75
- Native languages: Pangasinan; Ilocano; Tagalog
- Website: www.santamaria.gov.ph

Santa Maria, officially the Municipality of Santa Maria (Pangasinan: Baley na Santa Maria; Ilocano: Ili ti Santa Maria; Tagalog: Bayan ng Santa Maria), is a municipality in the province of Pangasinan, Philippines. According to the 2024 census, it has a population of 34,452 people.

== History ==
=== Spanish Colonial Era ===
Santa Maria was formerly a barrio of the municipality of Tayug. It was founded on January 10, 1855 as a separate town and was governed by a captain until 1863. In 1864, the town was reincorporated into the municipality of Tayug due to its inability to maintain its financial stability.

In 1877, the inhabitants of Santa Maria again applied for separation as a distinct municipality. The application was granted and Santa Maria again became a town under the governance of Captain Eugenio Vinluan.

For many years, during the Spanish Regime, religion was the basis of educating the masses. From time to time missionaries of different orders were sent out to Santa Maria to carry out religious services as required of them. It was during the routine visit of a certain priest from the town of Asingan, which was then the most eastern town of the province of Pangasinan, who had extended his mission farther into the east and came to a village. The village was located on a plain in which the Agno River ran and which with a little effort could be irrigated. The missionary believed that the village could be developed into a prosperous community. Finding the residents to be hospitable, he chatted with them and, in the course of conversation, he thought of giving the place a name. Since it was the Virgin Mary's Day, he called the people of the village to him and with a simple but impressive solemnity proclaimed this place as Santa Maria on this, the Virgin Mary's day.

=== American invasion era ===
In 1903, the Americans arrived in Santa Maria and their rule began. In 1901, there was an election for the president of Santa Maria. This was during the United States military government of the islands. The president was given a two-year term due to his good administration.

From 1903 to 1906, Santa Maria was incorporated again into the town of Tayug for financial reasons. Don Alejandro Gonzales was then elected president and served until 1910 when he was succeeded by Don Mariano de Guzman who served to 1912. From this date to the present, the different successions of presidents, alcaldes and mayors had occurred all over the islands.

=== Contemporary ===
In the course of time prominent people improved the locality and transferred the town site from Namagbagan, which is now a barrio of the municipality, to its present site near a clay promontory where it formed an impregnable defense against the yearly erosion of the Agno, thus annexing "De Pila" to the original name and making Santa Maria de Pila its final name, a name which is known beyond the confines of the province of Pangasinan.

The economic activities of the town are fueled in part by its close proximity to the neighboring municipalities of Rosales and Tayug.

== Geography ==
Santa Maria is situated 58.78 kilometers (36.52 mi) from the provincial capital Lingayen, and 186.00 kilometers (115.58 mi) from the country's capital city of Manila.

=== Barangays ===
Santa Maria is politically subdivided into 23 barangays. Each barangay consists of puroks and some have sitios.

- Bal-loy
- Bantog
- Caboluan
- Cal-litang
- Capandanan
- Cauplasan
- Dalayap
- Libsong
- Namagbagan
- Paitan
- Pataquid
- Pilar
- Poblacion East
- Poblacion West
- Pugot
- Samon
- San Alejandro
- San Mariano
- San Pablo
- San Patricio
- San Vicente
- Santa Cruz
- Sta. Rosa

=== Climate ===
Climate data for Santa Maria, Pangasinan
Month	Jan	Feb	Mar	Apr	May	Jun	Jul	Aug	Sep	Oct	Nov	Dec	Year
Mean daily maximum °C (°F)	29 (84)	29 (84)	30 (86)	32 (90)	33 (91)	33 (91)	33 (91)	33 (91)	33 (91)	32 (90)	31 (88)	29 (84)	31 (88)
Mean daily minimum °C (°F)	21 (70)	21 (70)	22 (72)	23 (73)	24 (75)	24 (75)	24 (75)	24 (75)	23 (73)	23 (73)	22 (72)	21 (70)	23 (73)
Average precipitation mm (inches)	127.5 (5.02)	115.8 (4.56)	129.7 (5.11)	141.1 (5.56)	248.2 (9.77)	165 (6.5)	185.3 (7.30)	161.9 (6.37)	221.4 (8.72)	299.5 (11.79)	199 (7.8)	188.7 (7.43)	2,183.1 (85.93)
Average rainy days	17	17	17	15	20	19	19	20	21	20	17	19	221
Source: World Weather Online

== Demographics ==
Population census of Santa Maria
Year	Pop.	±% p.a.
1903	7,628	—
1918	7,362	−0.24%
1939	10,295	+1.61%
1948	12,802	+2.45%
1960	14,230	+0.89%
1970	16,296	+1.36%
1975	18,766	+2.87%
1980	19,018	+0.27%
1990	23,793	+2.27%
1995	25,278	+1.14%
2000	27,860	+2.11%
2007	30,721	+1.36%
2010	31,091	+0.44%
2015	33,038	+1.16%
2020	34,220	+0.74%
2024	34,452	+0.16%
Source: Philippine Statistics Authority

== Economy ==
Poverty incidence of Santa Maria (%)

Source: Philippine Statistics Authority

== Government ==
=== Local government ===
Santa Maria is part of the sixth congressional district of the province of Pangasinan. It is governed by a mayor, designated as its local chief executive, and by a municipal council as its legislative body in accordance with the Local Government Code. The mayor, vice mayor, and the councilors are elected directly by the people through an election which is being held every three years.

== Education ==
The Sta. Maria Schools District Office governs all educational institutions within the municipality. It oversees the management and operations of all private and public, from primary to secondary schools.

=== Primary and elementary schools ===
- Bal-loy Elementary School
- Bantog-Capandanan Elementary School
- Caboluan Elementary School
- Cal-litang Elementary School
- Dalayap Elementary School
- Namagbagan Elementary School
- Our Lady of the Pillar Catholic School
- Pataquid Elementary School
- Pilar-Cauplasan Elementary School
- Pugot Elementary School
- Samon Elementary School
- San Francisco Elementary School
- San Pablo Elementary School
- San Vicente Elementary School
- West Central School
- Sta. Rosa Elementary School

=== Secondary schools ===
- Sta. Cruz Integrated School
- Sta. Maria East Integrated School
- St. Mary’s Integrated School Inc.
- Eastern Pangasinan Agricultural College

=== Higher educational institution ===
- Pangasinan State University - Santa Maria Campus

== Gallery ==
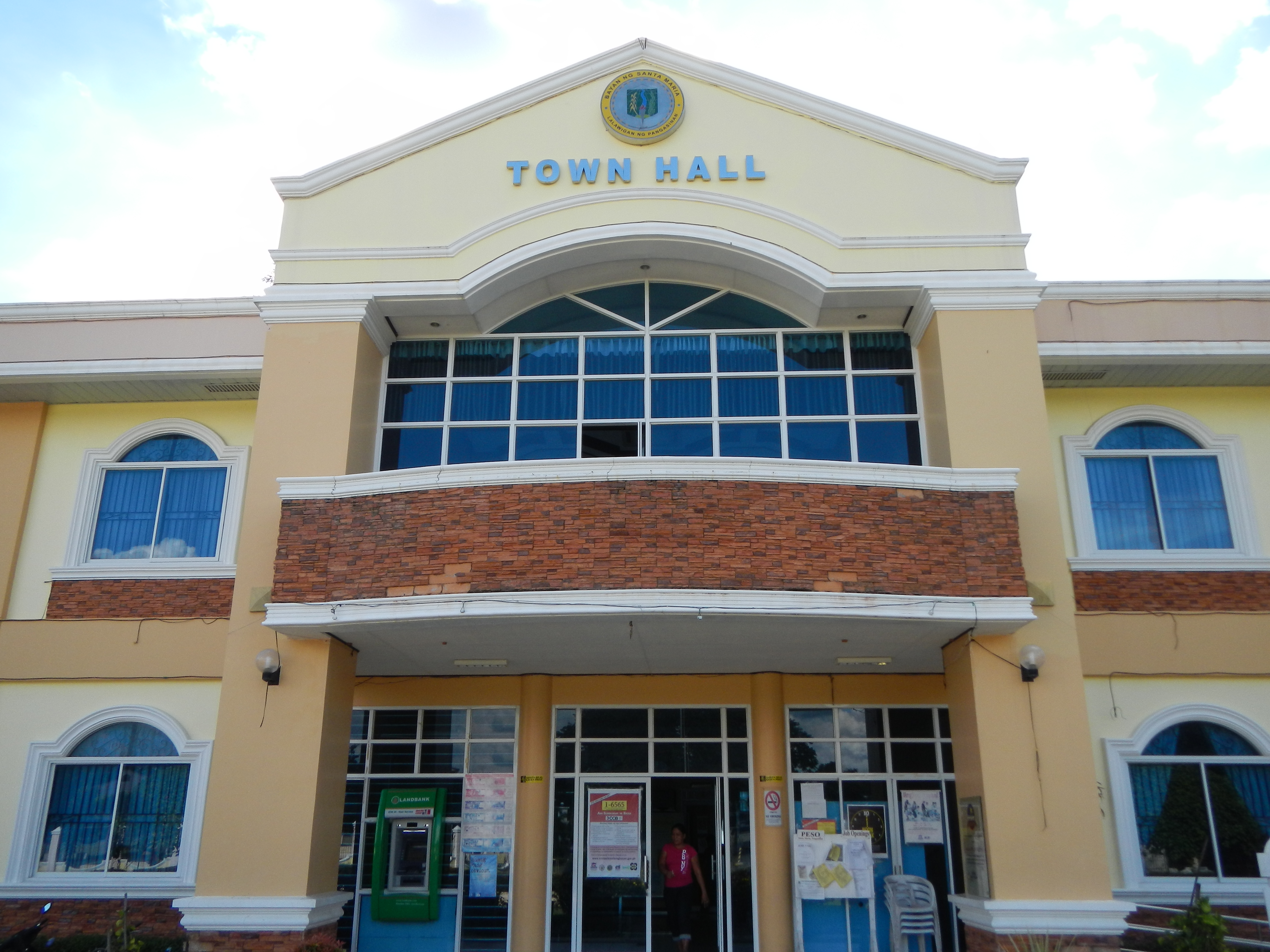
Santa Maria Town Hall

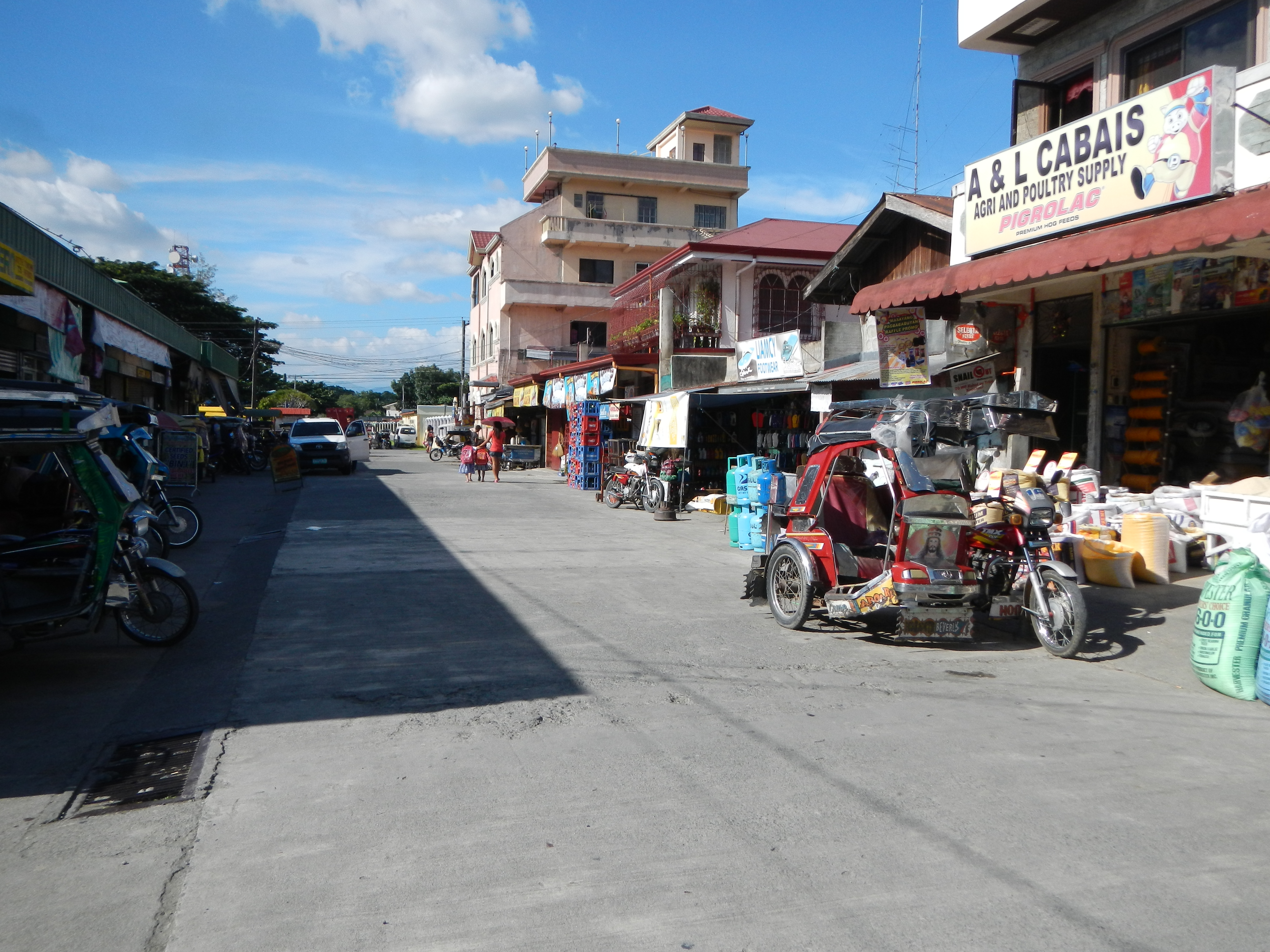
Public Market road to municipal hall and public park

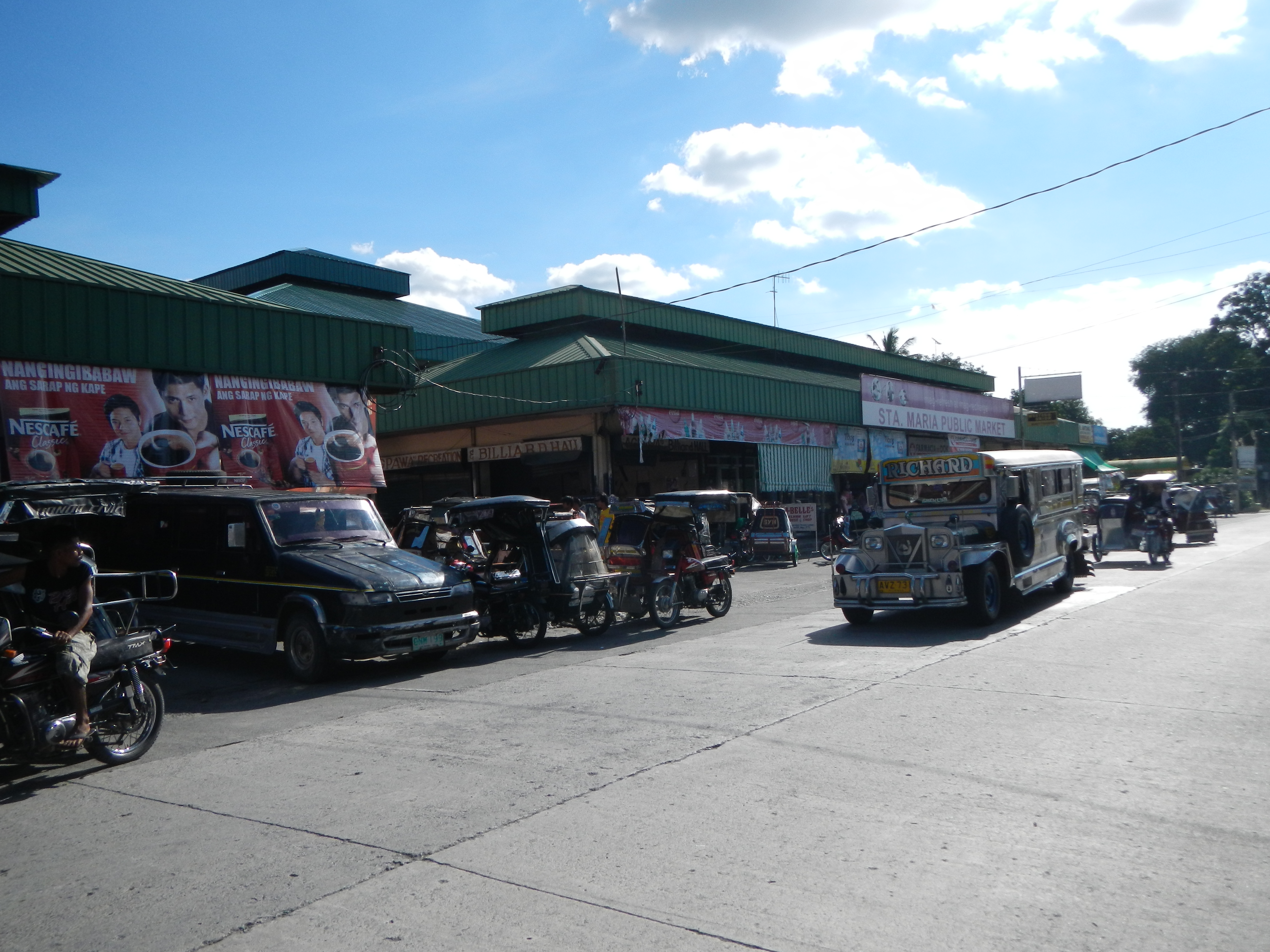
Public market

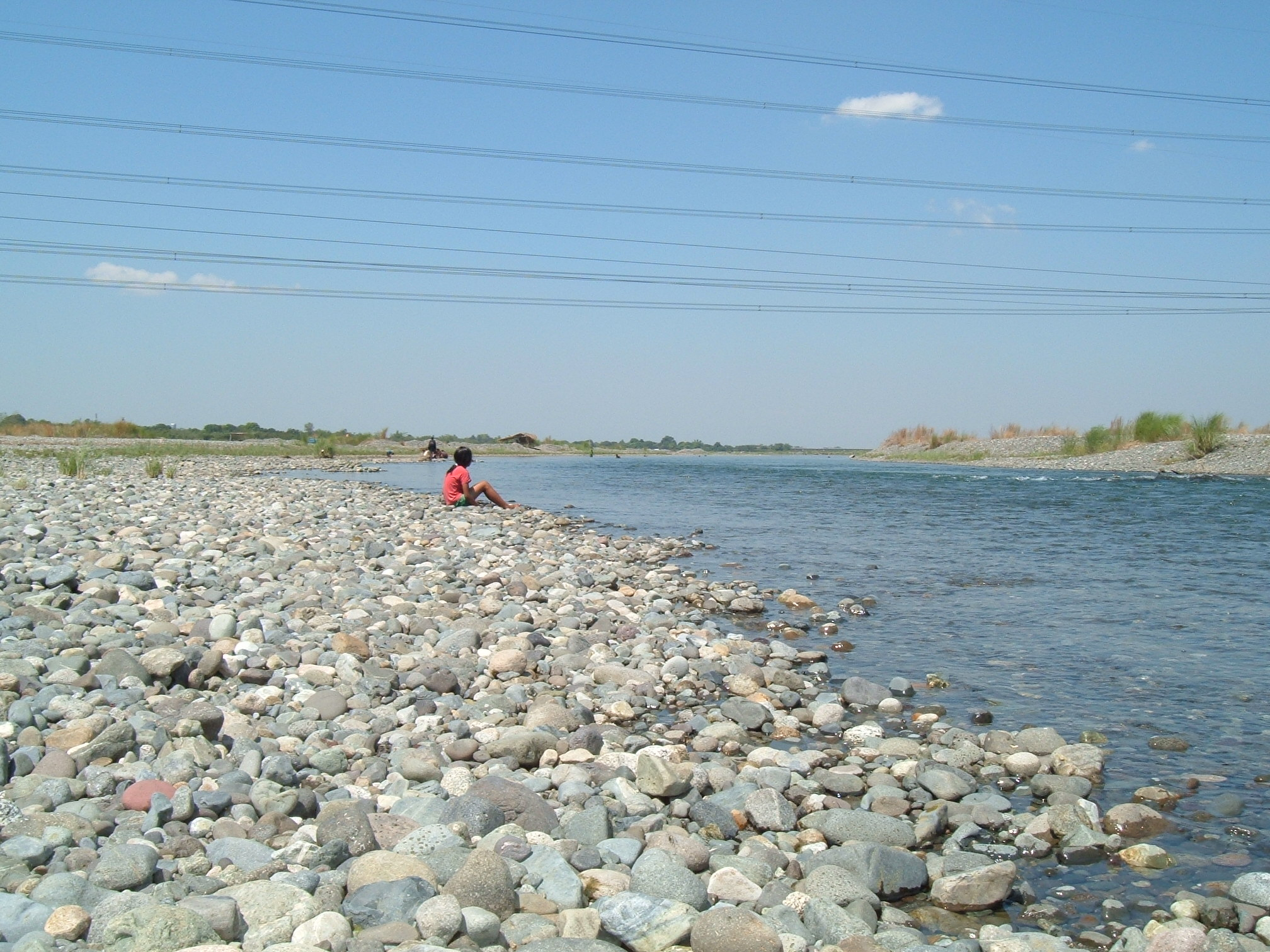
Part of Agno River flowing near Barangay San Vicente, Santa Maria Pangasinan. A faint image of Narciso Ramos Bridge can be seen at a distance.
