= Tayug =

Municipality in Pangasinan, Philippines

- Municipality
- Municipality of Tayug
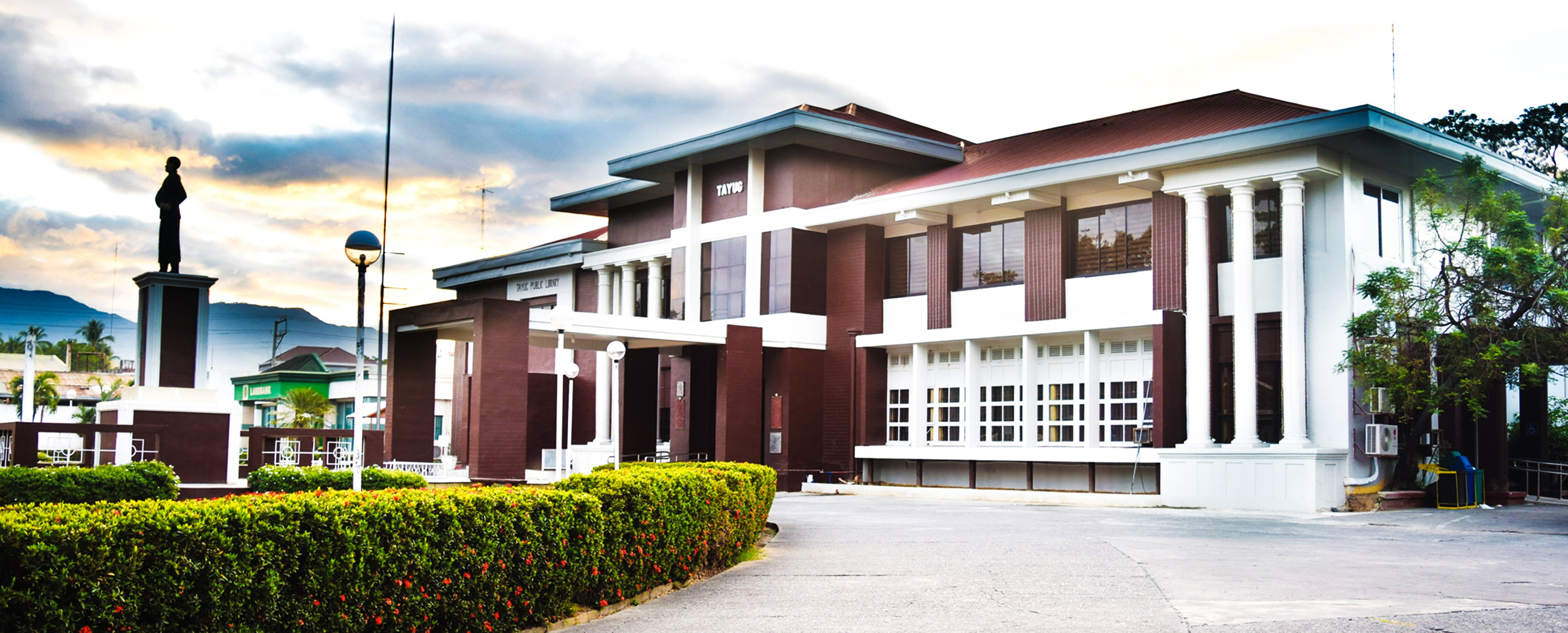
- Tayug Municipal Hall

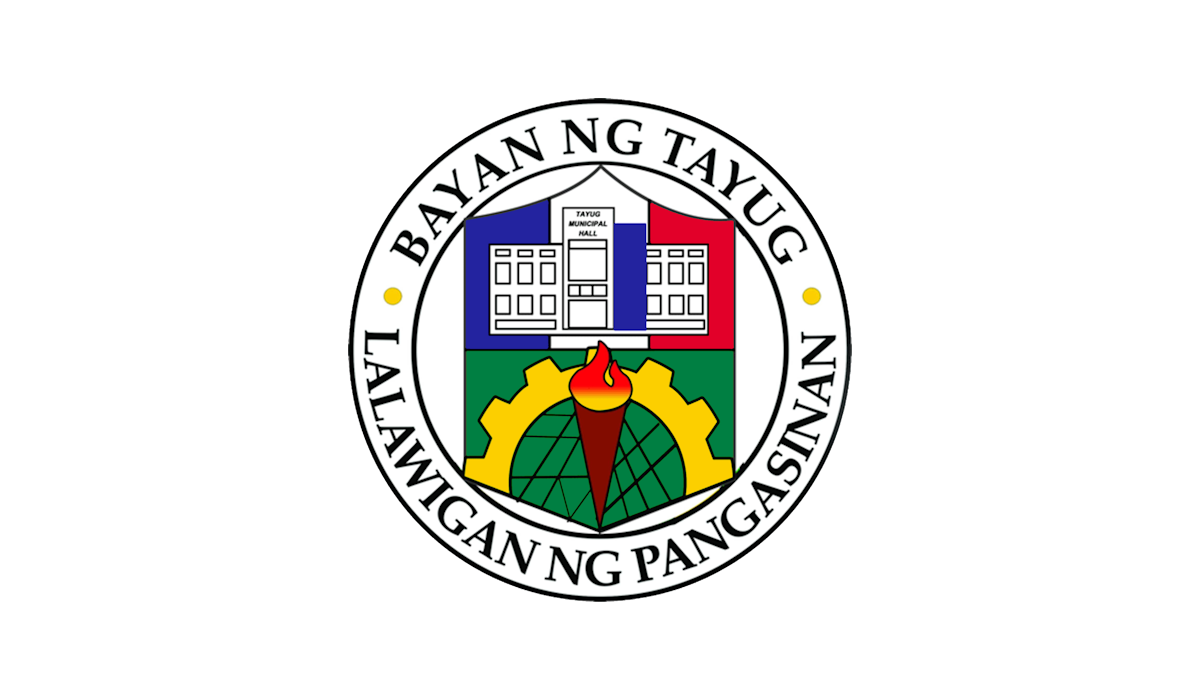
- Flag Seal

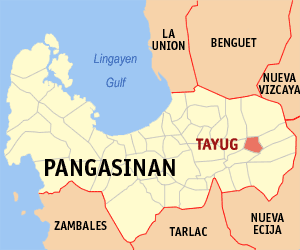
- Map of Pangasinan with Tayug highlighted
- Interactive map of Tayug
- Location within the Philippines
- Coordinates: 16°01′36″N 120°44′52″E
- Country: Philippines
- Region: Ilocos Region
- Province: Pangasinan
- District: 6th district
- Founded: c. 1723 or March 17, 1817
- Barangays: 21 (see Barangays)

Government
  - Type: Sangguniang Bayan
  - Mayor: Atty.Tyrone D.Agabas
  - Vice Mayor: Lorna Primicias-Tacdol
  - Representative: Marlyn Primicias-Agabas
  - Municipal Council: Members: Maritess Adloc; Madilyn P. Cabotaje-Ramirez; Michael Dy; Magdalena Mangelen; Henry Wards Aquino; Samuel Manzan; Noel Fernando Bince; Vacant
  - Electorate: 31,945 voters (2025)

Area
  - Total: 51.24 km^{2} (19.78 sq mi)
- Elevation: 59 m (194 ft)
- Highest elevation: 108 m (354 ft)
- Lowest elevation: 43 m (141 ft)

Population (2024 census)
  - Total: 45,476
  - Density: 887.5/km^{2} (2,299/sq mi)
  - Households: 12,184
- Demonym: Tayugenian

Economy
  - Income class: 1st municipal income class
  - Poverty incidence: 9.24% (2023)
  - Revenue: ₱ 227.3 million (2024)
  - Assets: ₱ 521.6 million (2024)
  - Expenditure: ₱ 195.5 million (2024)
  - Liabilities: ₱ 81.41 million (2024)

Service provider
  - Electricity: Pangasinan 3 Electric Cooperative (PANELCO 3)
- Time zone: UTC+8 (PST)
- ZIP code: 2445
- PSGC: 0105543000
- IDD : area code: +63 (0)75
- Native languages: Pangasinan; Ilocano; Tagalog

Tayug, officially the Municipality of Tayug (Pangasinan: Baley na Tayug; Ilocano: Ili ti Tayug; Tagalog: Bayan ng Tayug), is a municipality in the province of Pangasinan, Philippines. According to the 2024 census, it has a population of 45,476 people.

It is an agricultural municipality producing commercial crops, livestock, and poultry.

== Etymology ==
The town of Tayug got its unique name not from people who were influential or from name of saints, but from a very tall tree that once grew in the heart of the town which is believed to be a bakaiau or bacáyao tree (Madhuca betis (Blanco)), an indigenous fruit tree in the Philippines. It was so tall that the people at that time call it "layog" which means "high, towering like the palm trees" in Kapampangan and “very tall; high; towering” in Ilocano.

According to historical accounts, Tayug was formerly a constituent of a sprawling settlement along the upper reaches of the Pampanga River, which is now encompassed within the boundaries of the present-day province of Nueva Ecija. This proximity suggests that the linguistic heritage of the local populace might have been shaped by interactions with Kapampangans.

Over time, due to the locals' difficulty in pronouncing the letter "L," it became commonly replaced with the letter "T" in everyday speech. This linguistic shift eventually resulted in the adoption of the name Tayug.

== History ==
Tayug is an old settlement founded by the Augustinians who were administering what was then called Upper Pampanga, which later became the province of Nueva Ecija. The exact date of its foundation is not clearly known, but it must have been at the start of 18th century, because according to a book of baptism of the town of Asingan, an Augustinian priest was already mission work at that time in Tayug and San Nicolas. A chronicle of the convents and towns founded by Augustinian Order, Biblioteca Historíca Filipina, Volume 4, mentions 1759 as the year of its foundation, while a document dated in Retiro, 19 December 1742, and signed by King Philip V of Spain, mentions Tayug as one of the places that were founded by the Augustinian missionaries.

Tayug was first officially organized as a municipality in the province of Nueva Ecija on February 4, 1817. In 1837, Tayug was ceded to the province of Pangasinan. In 1851, it was once again incorporated with the province of Nueva Ecija. The town was finally ceded to Pangasinan for the last time in 1864 after decades of uncertainty.

On October 8, 1903, Tayug absorbed the municipality of Santa Maria and ceded barrio San Andres to Asingan, by virtue of Act No. 931. However, Santa Maria was later separated as a re-established municipality on October 31, 1906.

On January 12, 1931, an undercover collective of peasants known as the Philippine National Association, under the leadership of Pedro Calosa, launched an assault against the governing authorities. Their objectives were to assert independence from American governance, denounce societal injustices and economic disparities, and affirm the authority of the Aglipayan Church. Taking control of significant sites including the municipal hall and the Philippine Constabulary's command station, they also set fire to the residences of prominent figures and various structures. The uprising commenced before dawn and was swiftly suppressed by evening, marking a brief yet impactful challenge to colonial authority. A monument paying tribute to Pedro Calosa is situated at the intersection of Pangasinan-Nueva Vizcaya Road and Tayug-San Quintin Road, symbolizing the historical significance of the revolt.

Amid World War II, the town spearheaded a guerrilla assault against the Japanese Imperial Army, marking one of the earliest instances of resistance in the nation. Under the leadership of Lieutenant Severino Antiporda, they successfully expelled the invaders from the fortress and reclaimed the municipal hall on April 14, 1942. However, when the Japanese forces reappeared on May 3, 1942, their defense endured for more than a week before they ultimately surrendered. Subsequently, they, along with individuals suspected of supporting their cause, were executed.

The shifts in colonial governance during the Spanish colonial period, the uprisings under American occupation, and the resistance movements during the Japanese occupation reflect the dynamic history of Tayug. Through these tumultuous times, Tayug would have navigated the changing landscape, adapting to new circumstances and contributing to its distinct historical and cultural identity within the province of Pangasinan.

== Geography ==
Tayug is a landlocked municipality located in the eastern part of the province of Pangasinan with neighboring towns of San Manuel and San Nicolas to the north, Natividad to the east, Asingan and Santa Maria to the west, and San Quintin to the south. The municipality has a total land area of 51.24 square meters (551.5 sq ft) which constitutes 0.94% of the province's total land area.

Tayug is 80 kilometers (50 mi) from Lingayen, 196 kilometers (122 mi) from Manila, 83 kilometers (52 mi) from Cabanatuan, and 8 kilometers (5.0 mi) from Santa Maria.

As cited in Ángel Pérez, ed., Relaciones Agustinianas de las Razas del Norte de Luzón (Manila: Bureau of Public Printing, 1904)

=== Barangays ===
Tayug is politically subdivided into 21 barangays. Each barangay consists of puroks and some have sitios.

- Agno
- Amistad
- Barangobong
- Carriedo
- C. Lichauco
- Evangelista (old name: San Flaviano)
- Guzon (old name: Santa Ana)
- Lawak
- Legaspi
- Libertad
- Magallanes
- Panganiban
- Brgy. Poblacion A
- Brgy. Poblacion B
- Brgy. Poblacion C
- Brgy. Poblacion D
- Saleng
- Santo Domingo
- Toketec
- Trenchera
- Zamora (old name: Concordia)

=== Climate ===
The climate of Tayug is divided into two seasons, the wet and dry season. The months of June to October are generally termed as the wet season, characterized by rainy days and occasional typhoons, while the days during the dry season of November to May are relatively hot and dry period.

Climate data for Tayug, Pangasinan
Month	Jan	Feb	Mar	Apr	May	Jun	Jul	Aug	Sep	Oct	Nov	Dec	Year
Mean daily maximum °C (°F)	31 (88)	31 (88)	32 (90)	34 (93)	35 (95)	34 (93)	32 (90)	32 (90)	32 (90)	32 (90)	32 (90)	31 (88)	32 (90)
Mean daily minimum °C (°F)	22 (72)	22 (72)	22 (72)	24 (75)	24 (75)	24 (75)	24 (75)	24 (75)	24 (75)	23 (73)	23 (73)	22 (72)	23 (74)
Average precipitation mm (inches)	13.6 (0.54)	10.4 (0.41)	18.2 (0.72)	15.7 (0.62)	178.4 (7.02)	227.9 (8.97)	368 (14.5)	306.6 (12.07)	310.6 (12.23)	215.7 (8.49)	70.3 (2.77)	31.1 (1.22)	1,766.5 (69.56)
Average rainy days	3	2	2	4	14	16	23	21	24	15	10	6	140
Source: World Weather Online

== Demographics ==
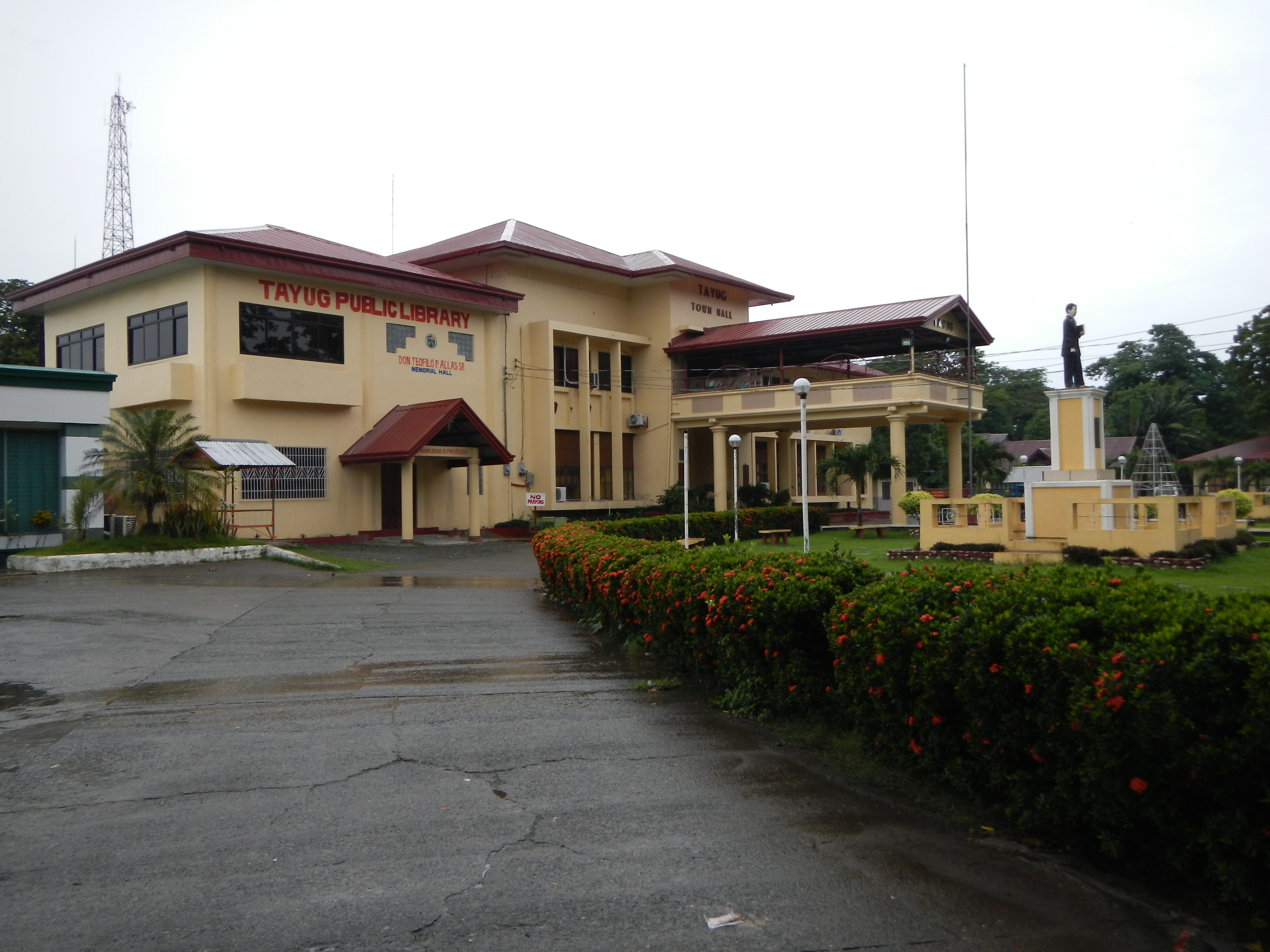
Tayug town hall and library

In the 2020 census, Tayug had a population of 45,241. The population density was 883 inhabitants per square kilometer.

Population census of Tayug
Year	Pop.	±% p.a.
1903	10,400	—
1918	13,594	+1.80%
1939	16,222	+0.85%
1948	19,782	+2.23%
1960	20,755	+0.40%
1970	24,143	+1.52%
1975	26,153	+1.62%
1980	26,273	+0.09%
1990	31,575	+1.86%
1995	33,881	+1.33%
2000	36,199	+1.43%
2007	37,954	+0.66%
2010	40,018	+1.95%
2015	43,149	+1.45%
2020	45,241	+1.00%
2024	45,476	+0.12%
Source: Philippine Statistics Authority

== Economy ==
Poverty incidence of Tayug (%)

Source: Philippine Statistics Authority

== Government ==
=== Local government ===
Tayug is part of the sixth congressional district of the province of Pangasinan. It is governed by a mayor, designated as its local chief executive, and by a municipal council as its legislative body in accordance with the Local Government Code. The mayor, vice mayor, and the councilors are elected directly by the people through an election which is being held every three years.

=== Elected officials ===
Members of the Municipal Council (2022–2025)
Position	Name
Congressman	Marlyn Primicias-Agabas
Mayor	Tyrone D. Agabas
Vice-Mayor	Lorna Primicias-Tacdol
Councilors	Maritess Aldoc
Councilors	Michael Dy
Councilors	Madilyn Cabotaje-Ramirez
Councilors	Magdalena Erfe-Mangelen
Councilors	Henry Wards Aquino
Councilors	Noel Fernando Bince
Councilors	Samuel Manzano
Councilors	Vacant

== Education ==
There are two schools district offices which govern all educational institutions within the municipality. They oversee the management and operations of all private and public, from primary to secondary schools. These are Tayug I Schools District Office, and Tayug II Schools District Office.

=== Primary and elementary schools ===
- Agno Elementary School
- Barangobong Elementary School
- Bright Child Montessori Christian Academy
- C. Lichauco Elementary School
- Carriedo Elementary School
- Divine Grace Montessori
- Eastern Pangasinan Christian Learning
- Evangelista Elementary School
- Florencio P.Guzon Elementary School (disputed)
- Kingsville Advanced School
- Lawak Elementary School
- Legaspi Elementary School
- Libertad Elementary School
- Magallanes Elementary School
- Panganiban Central Elementary School
- Saleng Elementary School
- St. Patrick Catholic School
- Sto. Domingo Elementary School
- Tayug Central Elementary School
- Tayug Foundational Christian Academy
- Tayug South Central Elementary School
- Toketec Elementary School
- Trenchera Elementary School
- Zamora Elementary School

=== Secondary schools ===
- Panganiban National High School
- Tayug National High School

=== Technical and vocational school ===
- Metro Global Institute of Science and Techhnology

=== Higher educational institution ===
- Panpacific University North Philippines
