= 1949 Philippine House of Representatives elections =

9th Philippine House of Representatives elections

- November 8, 1949

All 100 seats in the House of Representatives of the Philippines 51 seats needed for a majority
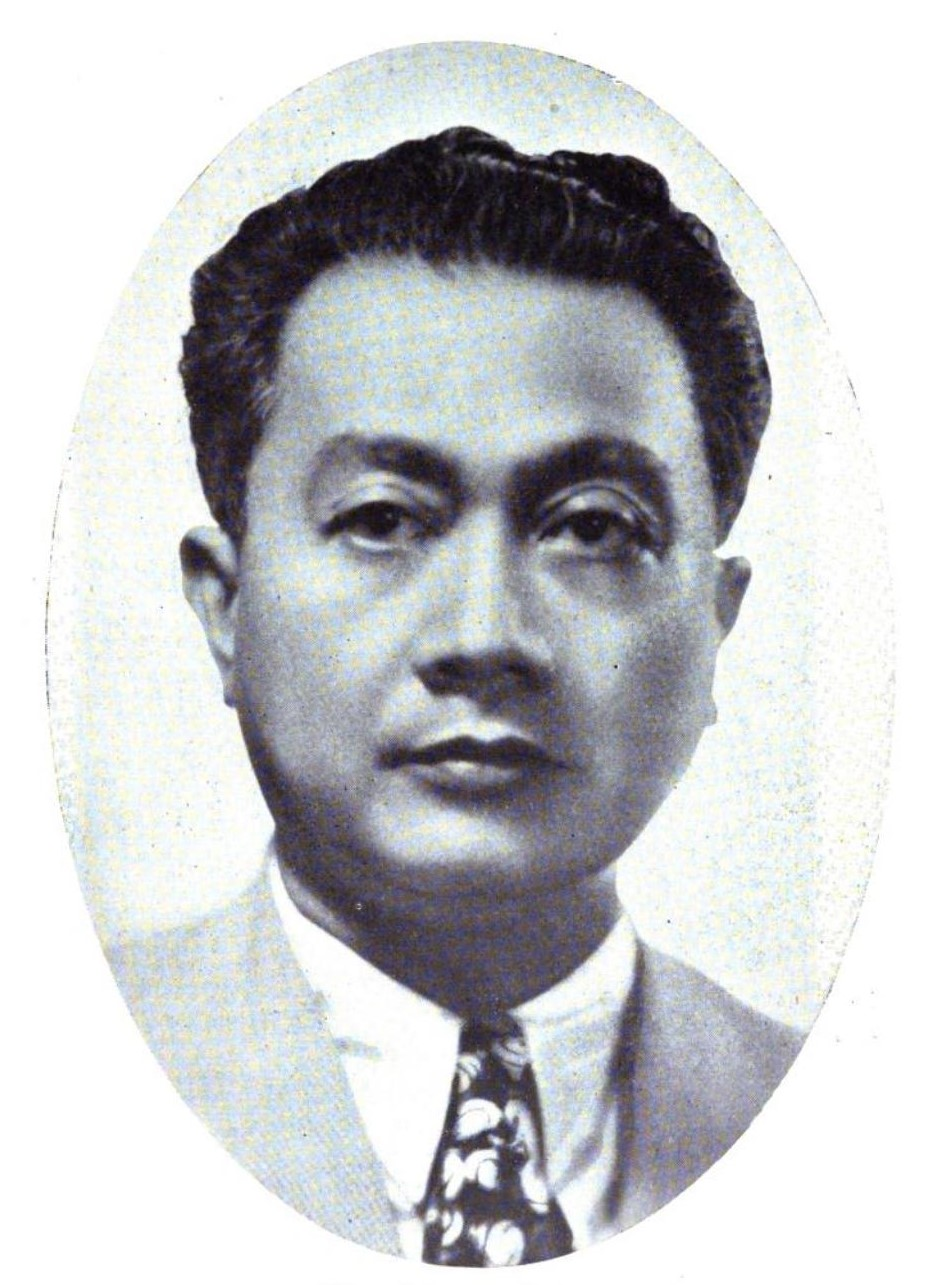

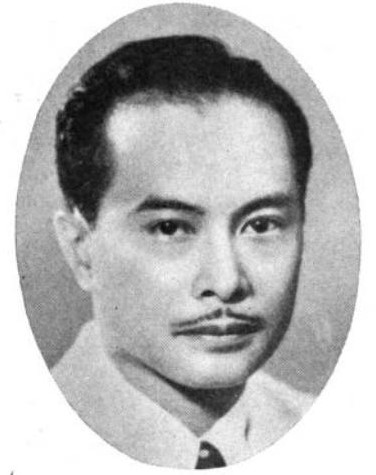

| | First party | Second party | Third party |
|---|---|---|---|
| Leader | Eugenio Pérez | Jose Laurel Jr. |
| Party | Liberal (Quirino wing) | Nacionalista | Liberal (Avelino wing) |
| Leader's seat | Pangasinan–2nd | Batangas–3rd |
| Last election | 49 seats, 38.89% | 35 seats, 45.78% | New party |
| Seats won | 66 | 33 | 6 |
| Seat change | ▲11 | ▼2 | ▲6 |
| Popular vote | 1,834,173 | 1,178,402 | 385,188 |
| Percentage | 53.00 | 34.05 | 11.13 |
| Swing | ▲14.11 | ▼11.73 | ▲11.13 |
Speaker before election
Eugenio Pérez
Liberal
Elected Speaker
Eugenio Pérez
Liberal

Elections for the House of Representatives of the Philippines were held on November 8, 1949. Held on the same day as the presidential election, the party of the incumbent president, Elpidio Quirino's Liberal Party, won a majority of the seats in the House of Representatives.

This was the first time in what would be a pattern in which the party of the incumbent president wins the elections for the members of the House of Representatives.

The elected representatives served in the 2nd Congress from 1949 to 1953.

== Electoral system ==
The House of Representatives has at most 120 seats, 100 seats for this election, all voted via first-past-the-post in single-member districts. Each province is guaranteed at least one congressional district, with more populous provinces divided into two or more districts.

Congress has the power of redistricting three years after each census.

== Results ==
| Party | Votes | % | +/– | Seats | +/– |
|---|---|---|---|---|---|
| Liberal Party (Quirino wing) (Note: The Liberal Party was split into two wings: those who supported Quirino or the "Quirinitas" or the "Quirino wing", and those who supported Avelino or the "Avelinistas" or the "Avelino wing".) | 1,834,173 | 53.00 | +14.11 | 60 | +11 |
| Nacionalista Party | 1,178,402 | 34.05 | −11.73 | 33 | −2 |
| Liberal Party (Avelino wing) | 385,188 | 11.13 | New | 6 | New |
| Citizens' Party | 6,434 | 0.19 | New | 0 | 0 |
| Democratic Party | 3,760 | 0.11 | New | 0 | 0 |
| People's Party | 3,423 | 0.10 | New | 0 | 0 |
| Collectivista Party | 193 | 0.01 | New | 0 | 0 |
| Christian Democrats | 52 | 0.00 | New | 0 | 0 |
| Independent | 49,265 | 1.42 | −2.34 | 1 | −4 |
| Total | 3,460,890 | 100.00 | – | 100 | +2 |
| Valid votes | 3,460,890 | 96.68 | +5.74 | | |
| Invalid/blank votes | 119,027 | 3.32 | −5.74 | | |
| Total votes | 3,579,917 | 100.00 | – | | |
| Registered voters/turnout | 5,135,814 | 69.70 | −18.96 | | |
Source: Nohlen, Grotz and Hartmann and Teehankee

Vote share
| Liberal (Quirino) | 53.00% |
| Nacionalista | 34.05% |
| Liberal (Avelino) | 11.13% |
| Others | 2.82% |

Seats
| Liberal (Quirino) | 60.00% |
| Nacionalista | 33.00% |
| Liberal (Avelino) | 6.00% |
| Others | 1.00% |

== Note ==
A. The combined number of seats of the Liberal Party before it was divided into two factions.

== See also ==
- 2nd Congress of the Philippines

== Bibliography ==
- Paras, Corazon L. (2000). The Presidents of the Senate of the Republic of the Philippines. ISBN 971-8832-24-6.
- Pobre, Cesar P. (2000). Philippine Legislature 100 Years. ISBN 971-92245-0-9.
