= Urbiztondo =

Municipality in Pangasinan, Philippines

- Municipality
- Municipality of Urbiztondo
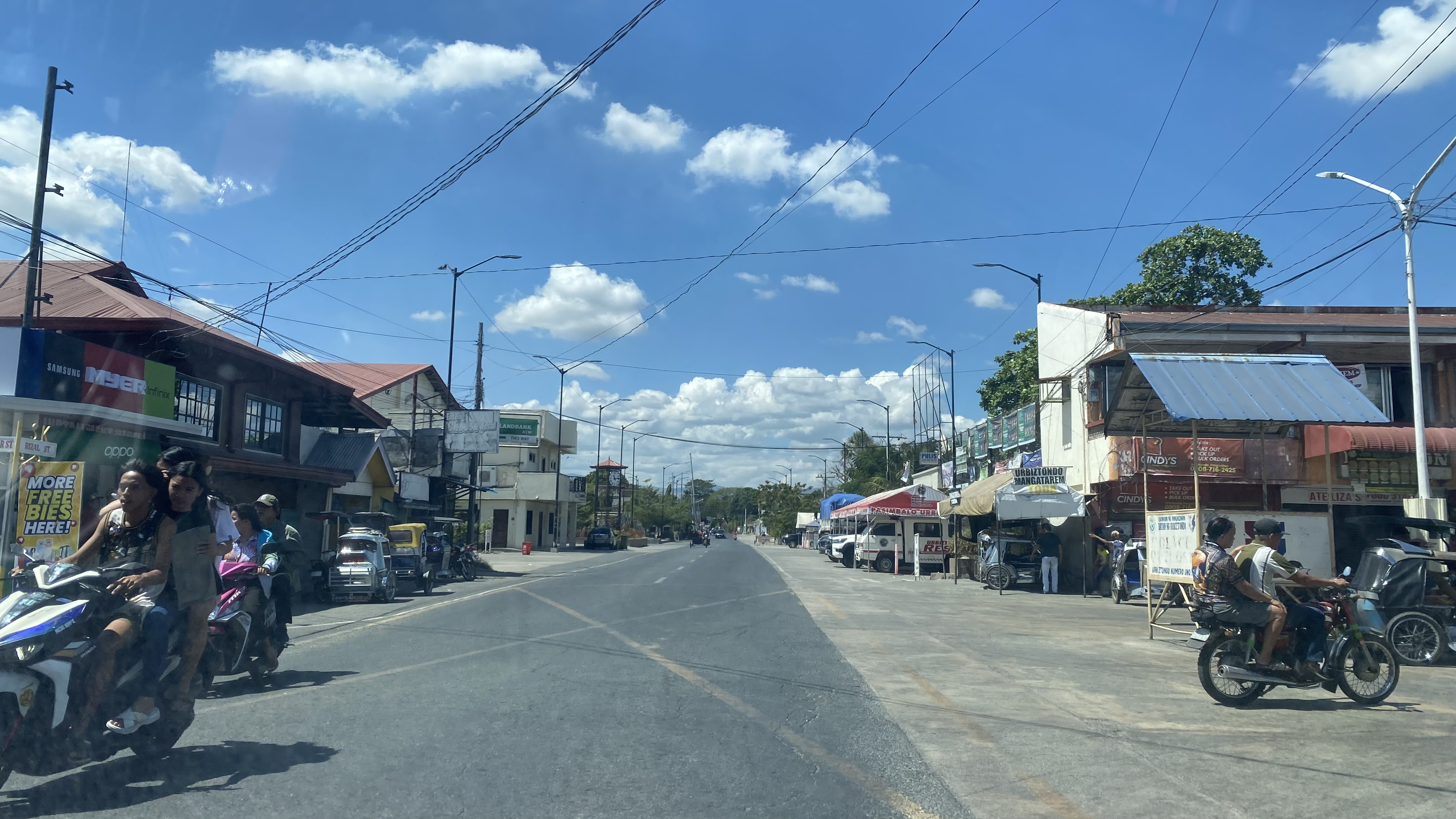
- Street in Urbiztondo

- Seal

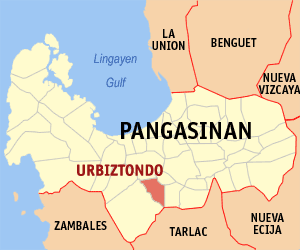
- Map of Pangasinan with Urbiztondo highlighted
- Interactive map of Urbiztondo
- Location within the Philippines
- Coordinates: 15°49′22″N 120°19′46″E
- Country: Philippines
- Region: Ilocos Region
- Province: Pangasinan
- District: 2nd district
- Founded: November 28, 1853
- Annexation to Mangatarem: October 8, 1903
- Chartered: October 31, 1906
- Named for: Juan Antonio de Urbiztondo
- Barangays: 21 (see Barangays)

Government
  - Type: Sangguniang Bayan
  - Mayor: Hon. Modesto Mejia Operaña
  - Vice Mayor: Atty. Lexis Dela Vega
  - Representative: Mark Cojuangco
  - Councilors: Members: Volter D. Balolong; Dyna P. de Guzman; Edwin T. Tamondong; Pepito N. Calugay; Danilo M. Tamondong; Brandy M. Palisoc; Vicente A. Frias Jr.; Jordan Melchor V. Palisoc
  - Electorate: 42,068 voters (2025)

Area
  - Total: 81.80 km^{2} (31.58 sq mi)
- Elevation: 14 m (46 ft)
- Highest elevation: 30 m (98 ft)
- Lowest elevation: 6 m (20 ft)

Population (2024 census)
  - Total: 56,349
  - Density: 688.9/km^{2} (1,784/sq mi)
  - Households: 12,323

Economy
  - Income class: 1st municipal income class
  - Poverty incidence: 18.13% (2023)
  - Revenue: ₱ 237.5 million (2024)
  - Assets: ₱ 799.3 million (2024)
  - Expenditure: ₱ 233.1 million (2024)
  - Liabilities: ₱ 355.4 million (2024)

Service provider
  - Electricity: Central Pangasinan Electric Cooperative (CENPELCO)
- Time zone: UTC+8 (PST)
- ZIP code: 2414
- PSGC: 0105545000
- IDD : area code: +63 (0)75
- Native languages: Pangasinan; Ilocano; Tagalog
- Website: urbiztondopang.gov.ph

Urbiztondo, officially the Municipality of Urbiztondo (Pangasinan: Baley na Urbiztondo; Ilocano: Ili ti Urbiztondo; Tagalog: Bayan ng Urbiztondo), is a municipality in the province of Pangasinan, Philippines. According to the 2024 census, it has a population of 56,349 people.

== History ==
The municipality was named after General Juan Antonio de Urbiztondo y Eguía, the Spanish Governor-General of the Philippines from 1850 to 1853, who was also known as the conqueror of the Muslims in Jolo. He then issued a decree founding the town and consequently the newly formed town was named “Urbiztondo” in his honor.

The town's establishment can be attributed to Fr. Ramon Dalmau, the parish priest of San Carlos (Binalatongan), who in 1852 began the process for its separation from San Carlos. While the area remained a visita of San Carlos for that year, the town of Urbiztondo was finally established as a separate entity on November 28, 1853, when it was assigned its own curate (parish priest). The Dominicans accepted Urbiztondo as a vicariate in 1855 and assigned Rev. Fr. Francisco Treserra to the town; he is also responsible for relocating the town to the place where it is now located.

On October 8, 1903, Urbiztondo was absorbed by the municipality of Mangatarem by virtue of Philippine Commission Act No. 931. It was later separated as a re-established municipality on October 31, 1906.

== Geography ==
Urbiztondo is situated 34.59 kilometers (21.49 mi) from the provincial capital Lingayen, and 193.41 kilometers (120.18 mi) from the country's capital city of Manila.

=== Barangays ===
Urbiztondo is politically subdivided into 21 barangays. Each barangay consists of puroks and some have sitios.

- Angatel
- Balangay
- Batancaoa
- Baug
- Bayaoas
- Bituag
- Camambugan
- Dalanguiring
- Duplac
- Galarin
- Gueteb
- Malaca
- Malayo
- Malibong
- Pasibi East
- Pasibi West
- Pisuac
- Poblacion
- Real
- Salavante
- Sawat

=== Climate ===
Climate data for Urbiztondo, Pangasinan
Month	Jan	Feb	Mar	Apr	May	Jun	Jul	Aug	Sep	Oct	Nov	Dec	Year
Mean daily maximum °C (°F)	31 (88)	32 (90)	33 (91)	34 (93)	33 (91)	32 (90)	31 (88)	30 (86)	31 (88)	32 (90)	32 (90)	31 (88)	32 (89)
Mean daily minimum °C (°F)	22 (72)	23 (73)	24 (75)	25 (77)	25 (77)	25 (77)	25 (77)	25 (77)	25 (77)	24 (75)	24 (75)	23 (73)	24 (75)
Average precipitation mm (inches)	9 (0.4)	11.4 (0.45)	11.1 (0.44)	5.4 (0.21)	258 (10.2)	315.6 (12.43)	463.1 (18.23)	663.2 (26.11)	479.7 (18.89)	121.9 (4.80)	75.8 (2.98)	16.8 (0.66)	2,431 (95.8)
Average rainy days	4	3	2	2	12	15	19	21	18	12	9	5	122
Source: World Weather Online

== Demographics ==
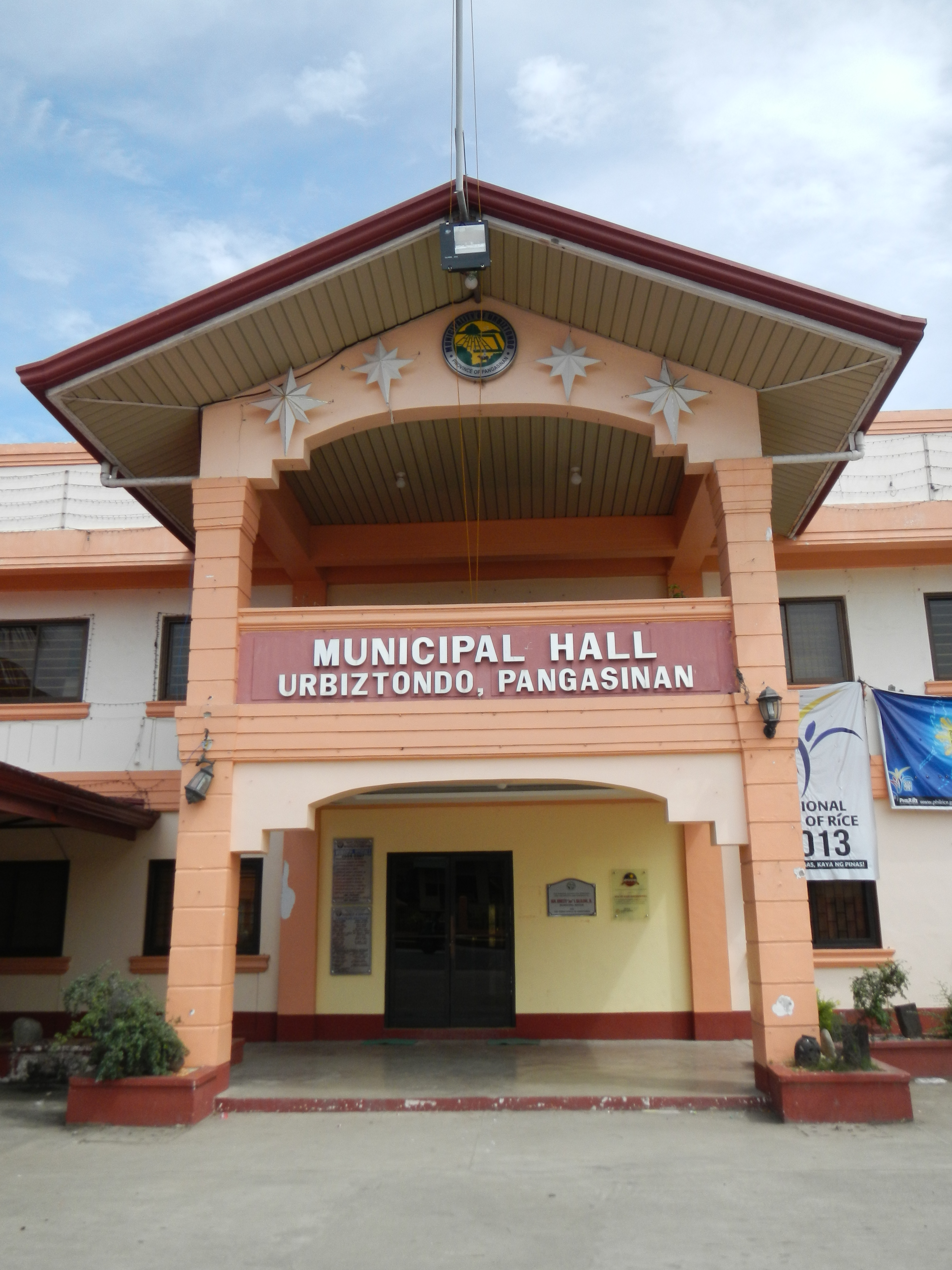
Municipal Hall

Population census of Urbiztondo
Year	Pop.	±% p.a.
1903	7,416	—
1918	8,538	+0.94%
1939	11,159	+1.28%
1948	15,721	+3.88%
1960	19,594	+1.85%
1970	23,385	+1.78%
1975	24,006	+0.53%
1980	27,348	+2.64%
1990	33,102	+1.93%
1995	35,746	+1.45%
2000	40,089	+2.49%
2007	43,430	+1.11%
2010	47,831	+3.58%
2015	50,170	+0.91%
2020	55,557	+2.17%
2024	56,349	+0.34%
Source: Philippine Statistics Authority

== Economy ==
Poverty incidence of Urbiztondo (%)

Source: Philippine Statistics Authority

== Government ==
=== Local government ===
Urbiztondo is part of the second congressional district of the province of Pangasinan. It is governed by a mayor, designated as its local chief executive, and by a municipal council as its legislative body in accordance with the Local Government Code. The mayor, vice mayor, and the councilors are elected directly by the people through an election which is being held every three years.

=== Elected officials ===
Members of the Municipal Council (2025–2028)
Position	Name
Congressman	Mark Cojuangco
Mayor	Hon. Modesto Mejia Operaña
Vice-Mayor	Alexis dela Vega
Councilors	Martin Sison
Councilors	Paeng Sison
Councilors	Erick Frias
Councilors	Baby Espinosa
Councilors	Rosalina Belen
Councilors	Mirla Balolong
Councilors	Jun Licuanan
Councilors	Joel Frias

== Education ==
The Urbiztondo Schools District Office governs all educational institutions within the municipality. It oversees the management and operations of all private and public, from primary to secondary schools.

=== Primary and elementary schools ===
- Angatel Elementary School
- Balangay Elementary School
- Batancaoa North Elementary School
- Batancaoa South Elementary School
- Baug Elementary School
- Camanbugan Elementary School
- Col. T. Custodio Elementary School
- Don Martin Palisoc Elementary School
- Don Pio B. Palisoc Elementary School
- Duplac Elementary School
- Galarin Elementary School
- Gueteb Elementary School
- Lead Academy of Urbiztondo
- Malayo - Buenlag Elementary School
- Malibong Elementary School
- Pasibi Bituag Elementary School
- Pasibe West Elementary School
- Real Elementary School
- Salavante Elementary School
- Sawat Elementary School
- Urbiztondo Adventist Multigrade School

=== Secondary schools ===
- Balangay National High School
- Bayaoas Integrated School
- Dalanguiring Integrated School
- Galarin National High School
- Real National High School
- Urbiztondo Integrated School
- Urbiztondo National High School
- Urbiztondo Private High School
- Urbiztondo Catholic School
