= List of Cultural Properties of the Philippines in Binmaley, Pangasinan =

The list of Cultural Properties of the Philippines in Binmaley, Pangasinan contains relevant cultural buildings in the Philippine municipality of Binmaley.

== List of properties ==
Cultural Property wmph identifier (Note: wmph is an internal identifier used by Wikimedia Philippines to identify the monument. This is not an official identifier, and only shown temporarily in the templates until the government creates an updated complete list.)	Site name	Description	Province	City or municipality	Address	Coordinates	Image
	Our Lady of the Purification Parish Church	17th century church	Pangasinan	Binmaley			Upload file
	Mary Help of Christians Seminary		Pangasinan	Binmaley			Upload file
	Rufino Ynzon House		Pangasinan	Binmaley			Upload file
	Clenior Ynzon House	Built in the 1900s	Pangasinan	Binmaley			Upload file
	Quinto House	Built in 1939	Pangasinan	Binmaley			Upload Photo
	Ferrer Ancestral House	Built by Felix Ferrer, former governor of Bontoc, Mt. Province, in the 1900s. Multiple renovations since 1947	Pangasinan	Binmaley			Upload file
