= Eugenio Pérez =

Speaker of the House of Representatives of the Philippines from 1946 to 1953

The Honorable Eugenio Pérez
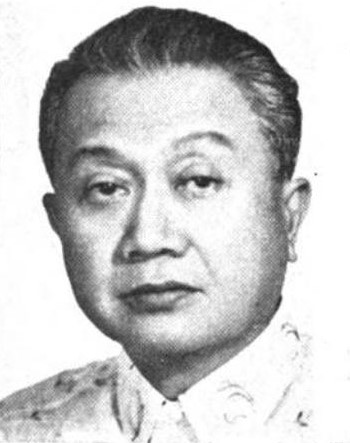
- Pérez official portrait during the 3rd Congress.

8th Speaker of the House of Representatives of the Philippines
- In office May 25, 1946 – December 30, 1953
- Preceded by: Jose Zulueta
- Succeeded by: Jose Laurel Jr.

House Minority Leader
- In office January 25, 1954 – August 4, 1957
- Preceded by: Jose Laurel Jr.
- Succeeded by: Ferdinand Marcos
- In office June 9, 1945 – December 20, 1945
- Preceded by: Vicente Singson Encarnacion
- Succeeded by: Cipriano Primicias Sr.

Member of the Philippine House of Representatives from Pangasinan's 2nd district Member of the National Assembly (1935–1941)
- In office June 11, 1945 – August 4, 1957
- Preceded by: District recreated
- Succeeded by: Angel B. Fernández
- In office 1928 – December 30, 1941
- Preceded by: Isidoro Siapno
- Succeeded by: District dissolved

Member of the San Carlos Municipal Council
- In office 1926–1928

4th President of the Liberal Party
- In office December 30, 1950 – December 30, 1957
- Preceded by: Elpidio Quirino
- Succeeded by: Diosdado Macapagal

Personal details
- Born: Eugenio Padlan Pérez; November 13, 1896 Sitio Obong, Barrio Basista, San Carlos, Pangasinan, Captaincy General of the Philippines
- Died: August 4, 1957 (aged 60) Quezon City, Philippines
- Party: Liberal (1946–1957); Nacionalista (1926–1946)
- Spouse: Consuelo Salazar
- Children: 3
- Education: University of the Philippines
- Occupation: Lawyer

Eugenio Padlan Pérez (November 13, 1896 – August 4, 1957) was a Filipino politician who served as speaker of the House of Representatives of the Philippines from 1946 to 1953. He was a member of the Liberal Party, whose president he served as during his term as Speaker.

== Early life ==
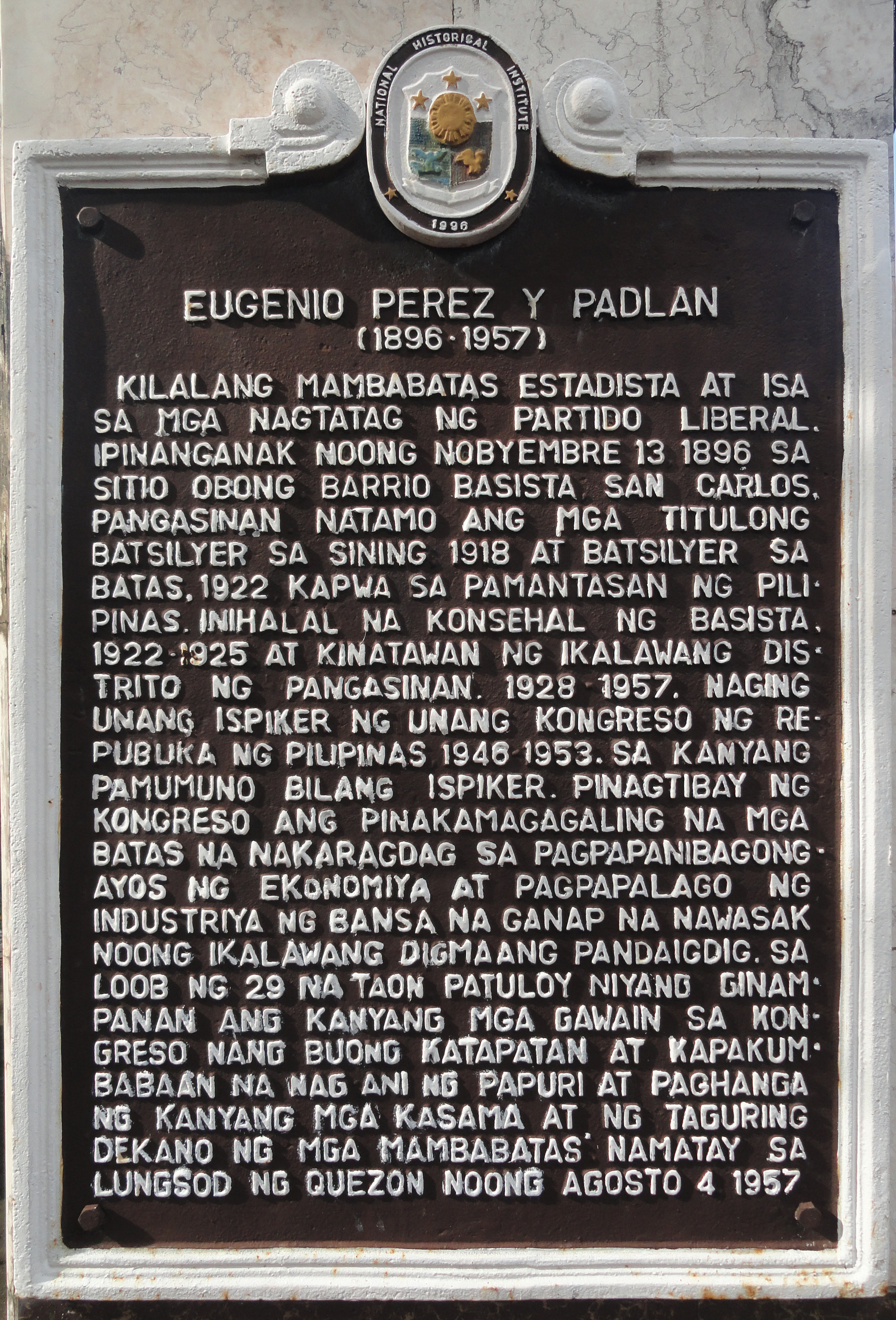
Historical marker installed in 1996 in Basista, Pangasinan

Pérez was born on November 13, 1896, in Sitio Obong, Barrio Basista, San Carlos, Pangasinan (now Barangay Obong, Basista, Pangasinan). He earned his Bachelor of Arts at the University of the Philippines in 1918 and his law degree from that institution's College of Law in 1922. While in law school, he worked as a clerk in the Bureau of Agriculture and the Executive Bureau.

== Political career ==
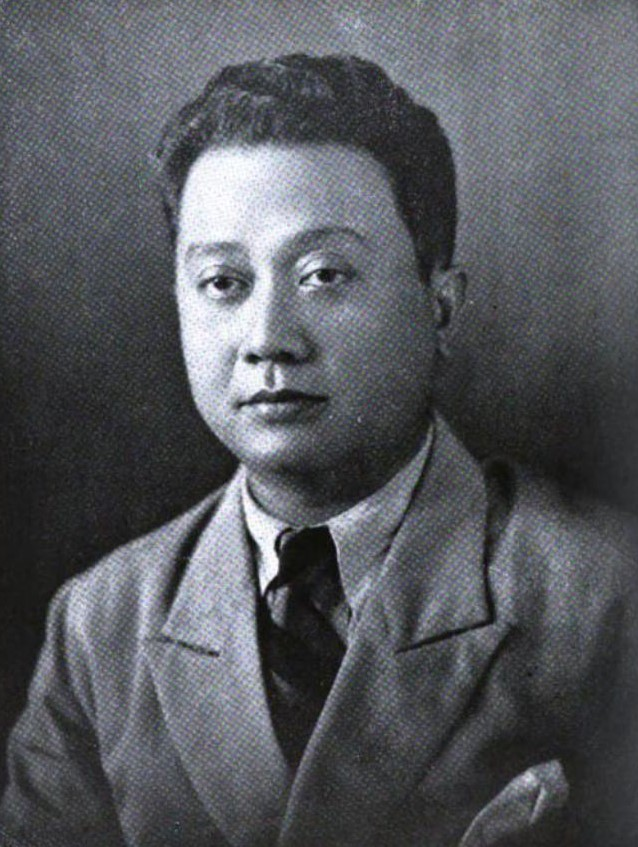
Photograph from The Commercial & Industrial Manual of the Philippines, 1941

Pérez first entered politics in 1926 when he was elected to the municipal council of his hometown, San Carlos. In 1928, he was elected to the House of Representatives of the Philippine Islands (later National Assembly) as a Representative of the 2nd district of Pangasinan. He served for nine consecutive terms.

In 1946, Pérez joined the newly established Liberal Party, which obtained a congressional majority in the House of Representatives in the 1946 general elections. He was elected Speaker of the House of Representatives when the 1st Congress of the Philippines convened later that year, and would serve as House Speaker throughout the 1st and 2nd Congresses.

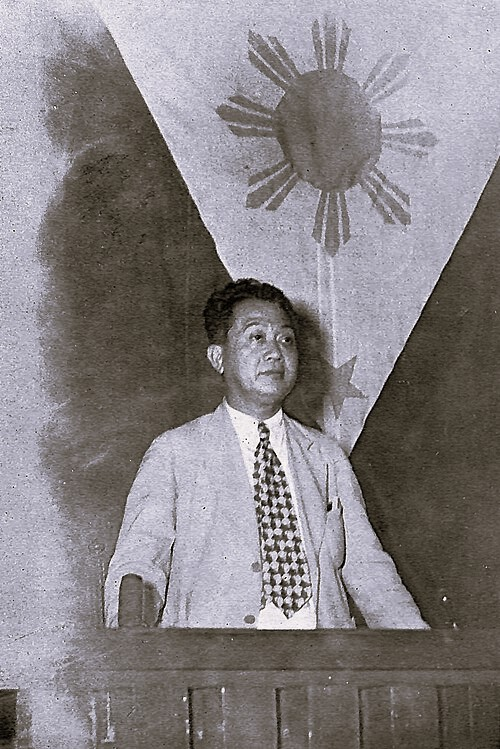
Photograph from the Blue Book: First Anniversary of the Republic of the Philippines, published 1947

Pérez was a leading congressional ally of Presidents Manuel Roxas and Elpidio Quirino, both of whom were Liberals. He helped secure the passage of the Bell Trade Act and the Parity Rights Amendment to the Constitution, allowing American citizens and corporations equal access to Philippine minerals, forests and other natural resources. He defended the exercise of President Quirino of emergency powers granted to the President after the end of World War II. When Quirino grew increasingly unpopular, Pérez rejected pleas from fellow Members of Congress to challenge the incumbent president for the Liberal Party nomination in the 1953 presidential elections. Perez managed the unsuccessful re-election campaign of Quirino in 1953.

The Liberal Party lost its congressional majority in the House of Representatives in the 1953 general elections. Pérez assumed the role of Minority Floor Leader, while he was succeeded as House Speaker by Jose Laurel Jr. of the Nacionalista Party. Pérez died in office on August 4, 1957.

== Family ==
Pérez was married to a soprano, Consuelo Salazar with whom he had three legitimate children, Victoria, Consuelo and Eugenio Jr.

His first daughter, Victoria, was the first wife of Jose de Venecia Jr., who would become House Speaker thirty-five years after Pérez's death. His second daughter Consuelo is a lawyer and served as associate commissioner of the National Telecommunications Commission and commissioner of the Commission on Information and Communications Technology. His legitimate son Eugenio Perez Jr. is a Dartmouth alumnus.

Furthermore, when he was a bachelor, he acknowledged having one prior biological child, José "Pepito" Pérez, who was born on December 3, 1929.

== Legacy ==
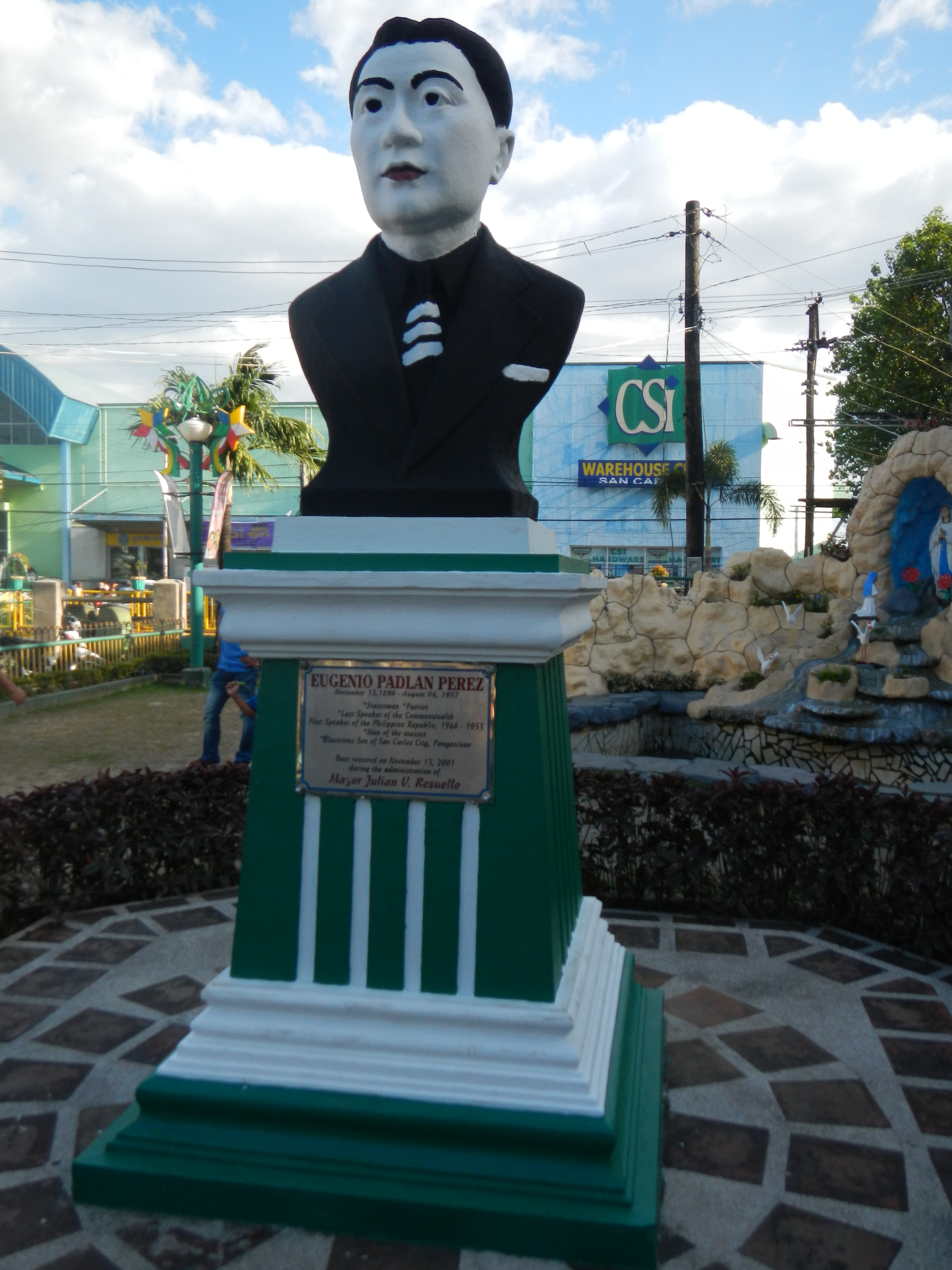
Eugenio Padlan Pérez bust-memorial (“Manong Eniong”), San Carlos, Pangasinan Plaza .

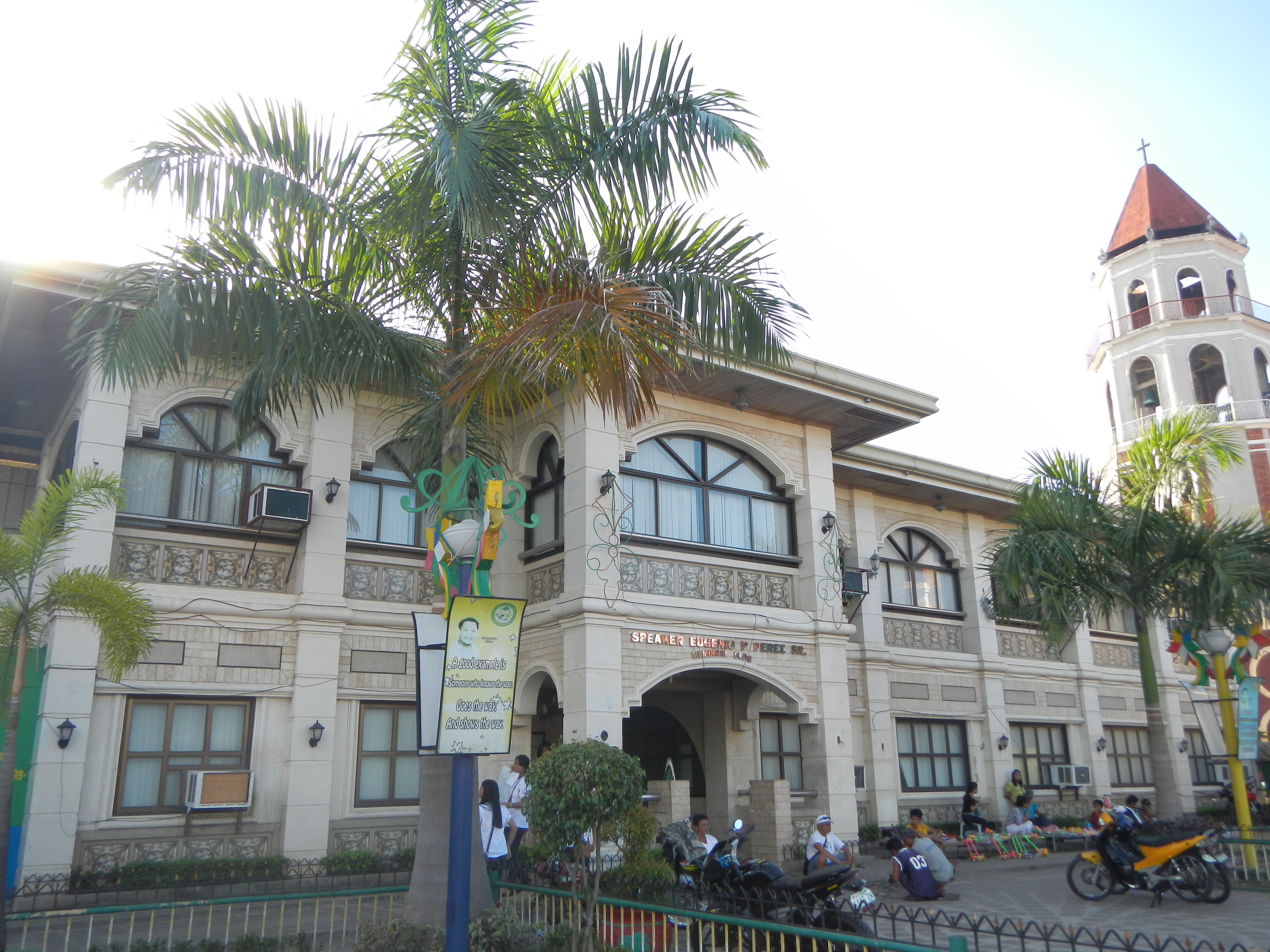
Speaker Perez Memorial Building

- Yearly on November 13, a special non-working holiday in commemoration of his birth is observed at his home province of Pangasinan.
- A street in Quezon City, a national road network from Rosales to Binmaley, and a building in San Carlos, Pangasinan, are named after him.
- A bust of Perez is located at the plaza of San Carlos, Pangasinan.

== Notes ==
Political offices
Vacant Title last held by Vicente Singson Encarnacion as Minority Floor Leader of the Philippine Assembly	Minority Floor Leader of the House of Representatives; 1945	Succeeded by Cipriano Primicias Sr.
Preceded by José Zulueta	Speaker of the House of Representatives; 1946–1953	Succeeded by Jose Laurel, Jr.
Preceded by Jose Laurel, Jr.	Minority Floor Leader of the House of Representatives; 1954–1957	Succeeded by Cornelio Villareal
House of Representatives of the Philippines
Preceded by Isidoro Siapno	Representative, 2nd district of Pangasinan; 1928–1941	District dissolved
District recreated	Representative, 2nd district of Pangasinan; 1945–1957	Succeeded by Angel Fernández
Party political offices
Preceded by Elpidio Quirino	President of the Liberal Party; 1950–1957	Succeeded by Diosdado Macapagal
