= Basista =

Municipality in Pangasinan, Philippines

- Municipality
- Municipality of Basista
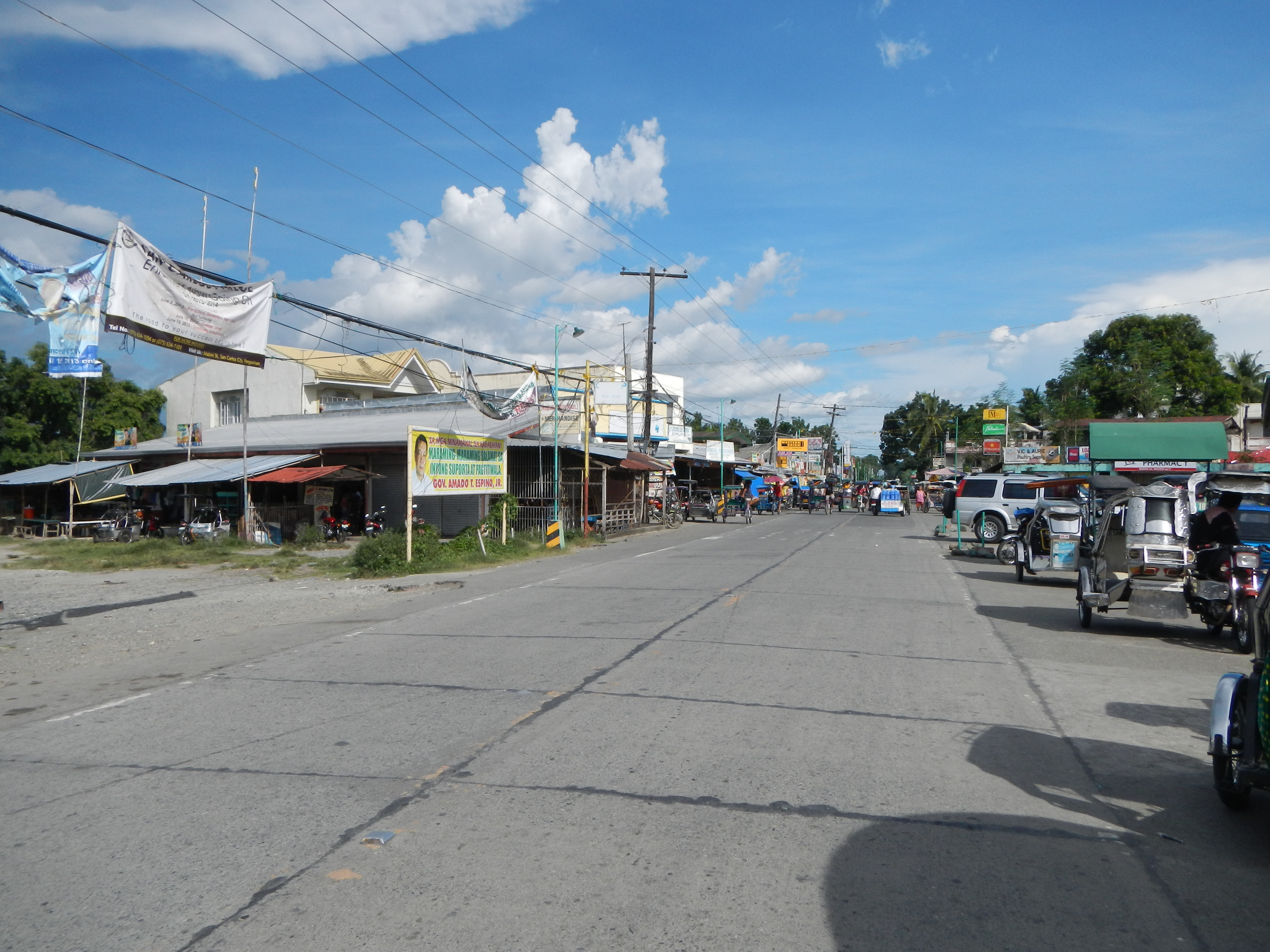

- Seal
- Nickname: Home of the finest musicians
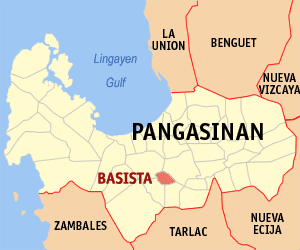
- Map of Pangasinan with Basista highlighted
- Interactive map of Basista
- Location within the Philippines
- Coordinates: 15°51′09″N 120°23′51″E
- Country: Philippines
- Region: Ilocos Region
- Province: Pangasinan
- District: 2nd district
- Founded: September 5, 1961
- Chartered: May 8, 1967
- Barangays: 13 (see Barangays)

Government
  - Type: Sangguniang Bayan
  - Mayor: Jolly R. Resuello
  - Vice Mayor: Dante P. Bustarde
  - Representative: Mark Cojuangco
  - Municipal Council: Members: Christian S. Bacani; Jake Niccole L. Perez; Dominador A. Frias; Monica N. Ramos; Vanessa F. Baraquio; Marino C. Capua; Bernard S. Doria; Teresita S. Erquiza
  - Electorate: 26,433 voters (2025)

Area
  - Total: 24.00 km^{2} (9.27 sq mi)
- Elevation: 15 m (49 ft)
- Highest elevation: 48 m (157 ft)
- Lowest elevation: 6 m (20 ft)

Population (2024 census)
  - Total: 37,840
  - Density: 1,577/km^{2} (4,084/sq mi)
  - Households: 8,824

Economy
  - Income class: 3rd municipal income class
  - Poverty incidence: 14.77% (2023)
  - Revenue: ₱ 161.4 million (2024)
  - Assets: ₱ 244.5 million (2024)
  - Expenditure: ₱ 143.2 million (2024)
  - Liabilities: ₱ 34.32 million (2024)

Service provider
  - Electricity: Central Pangasinan Electric Cooperative (CENPELCO)
- Time zone: UTC+8 (PST)
- ZIP code: 2422
- PSGC: 0105509000
- IDD : area code: +63 (0)75
- Native languages: Pangasinan; Ilocano; Tagalog

Basista, officially the Municipality of Basista (Pangasinan: Baley na Basista; Ilocano: Ili ti Basista; Tagalog: Bayan ng Basista), is a municipality in the province of Pangasinan, Philippines. According to the 2024 census, it has a population of 37,840 people.

Basista is 29 kilometres (18 mi) from Lingayen, 198 kilometres (123 mi) from Manila, 10 kilometres (6.2 mi) from San Carlos, and 8 kilometres (5.0 mi) from Bayambang.

== History ==
The former barrio, now the site of the town proper or poblacion, was formerly the largest and one of the most progressive barrios located in the southern part of its mother town, San Carlos (now a city).

As early as 1918, prominent citizens of the then-barrio of Basista came together and initiated an attempt to petition the municipal government of San Carlos and the provincial board of Pangasinan to grant the status of township to their barrios. Although local politicians supported the effort, the request was initially denied.

On September 5, 1961, President Carlos P. Garcia issued Executive Order No. 446, creating the town of Basista composed of 13 out of the 28 barrios that petitioned. Four years later, however, the Philippine Supreme Court declared the town's creation as being without legal basis, citing their ruling in the "Emmanuel Pelaez vs. Auditor General" that "municipalities created under Executive Orders are void". It was here that Republic Act No. 4866 filed by Pangasinan 2nd District Representative Jack L. Soriano, was enacted into law and legally created Basista as a town of Pangasinan.

== Geography ==
Basista is situated 30.34 kilometres (18.85 mi) from the provincial capital Lingayen, and 204.71 kilometres (127.20 mi) from the country's capital city of Manila.

=== Barangays ===
Barangays of Basista

Basista is politically subdivided into 13 barangays. Each barangay consists of puroks and some have sitios.

- Anambongan
- Bayoyong
- Cabeldatan
- Dumpay
- Malimpec East
- Mapolopolo
- Nalneran
- Navatat
- Obong
- Osmena, Sr.
- Palma
- Patacbo
- Poblacion

=== Climate ===
Climate data for Basista, Pangasinan
Month	Jan	Feb	Mar	Apr	May	Jun	Jul	Aug	Sep	Oct	Nov	Dec	Year
Mean daily maximum °C (°F)	31 (88)	31 (88)	31 (88)	33 (91)	32 (90)	32 (90)	30 (86)	30 (86)	30 (86)	31 (88)	31 (88)	31 (88)	31 (88)
Mean daily minimum °C (°F)	21 (70)	21 (70)	22 (72)	24 (75)	24 (75)	24 (75)	23 (73)	23 (73)	23 (73)	23 (73)	23 (73)	22 (72)	23 (73)
Average precipitation mm (inches)	5.1 (0.20)	11.6 (0.46)	21.1 (0.83)	27.7 (1.09)	232.9 (9.17)	350.8 (13.81)	679.8 (26.76)	733.1 (28.86)	505 (19.9)	176.6 (6.95)	67.2 (2.65)	17.7 (0.70)	2,828.6 (111.38)
Average rainy days	3	3	3	4	14	18	23	25	22	15	8	4	142
Source: World Weather Online (modeled/calculated data, not measured locally)

== Demographics ==
Population census of Basista

Year	Pop.	±% p.a.
1970	14,204	—
1975	15,241	+1.42%
1980	17,191	+2.44%
1990	22,360	+2.66%
1995	24,278	+1.55%
2000	26,616	+1.99%

Year	Pop.	±% p.a.
2007	28,104	+0.75%
2010	30,385	+2.88%
2015	32,959	+1.56%
2020	37,679	+2.86%
2024	37,840	+0.10%

Source: Philippine Statistics Authority

== Economy ==
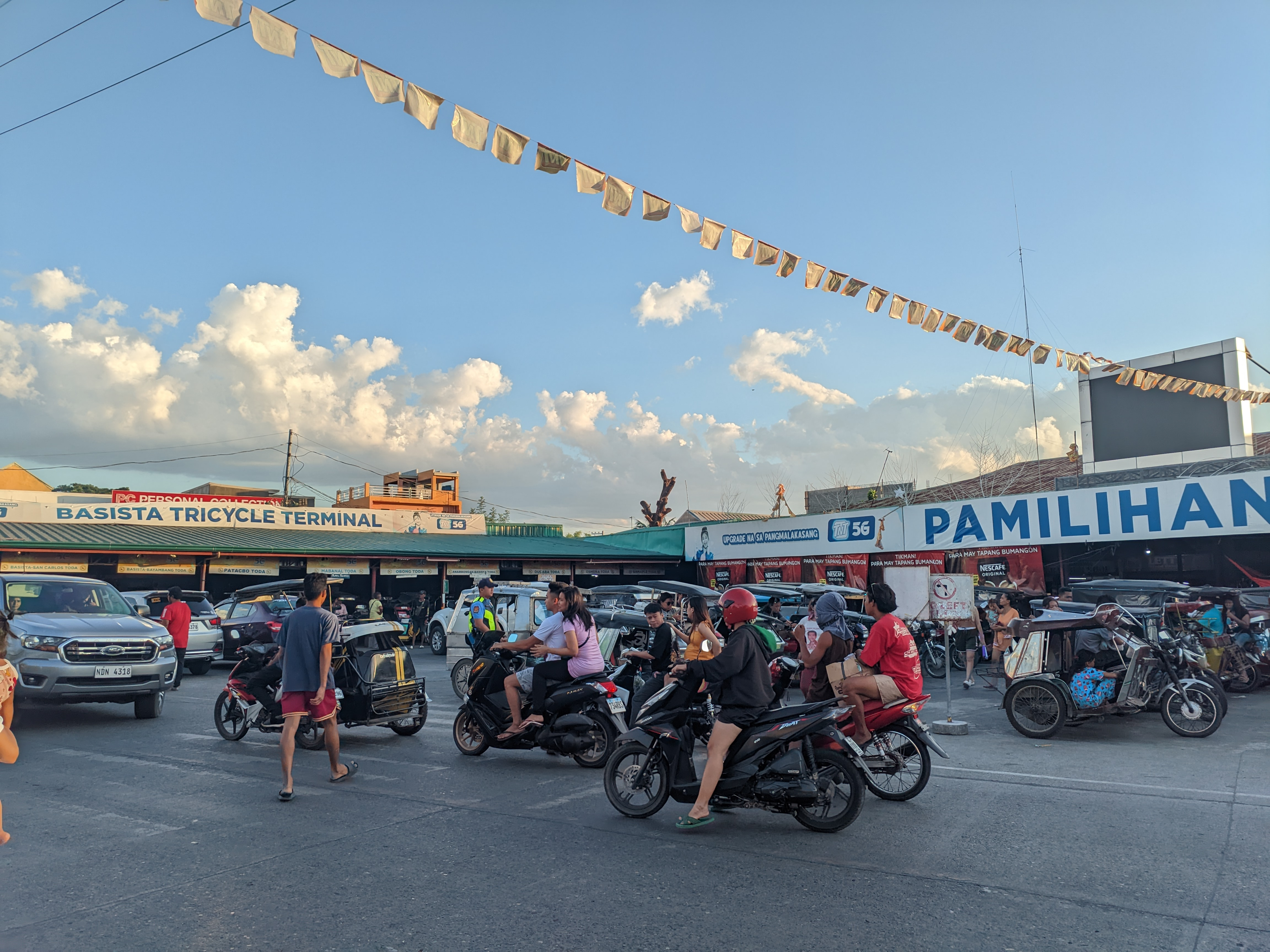
Public market and tricycle terminal

Poverty incidence of Basista (%)

Source: Philippine Statistics Authority

== Government ==
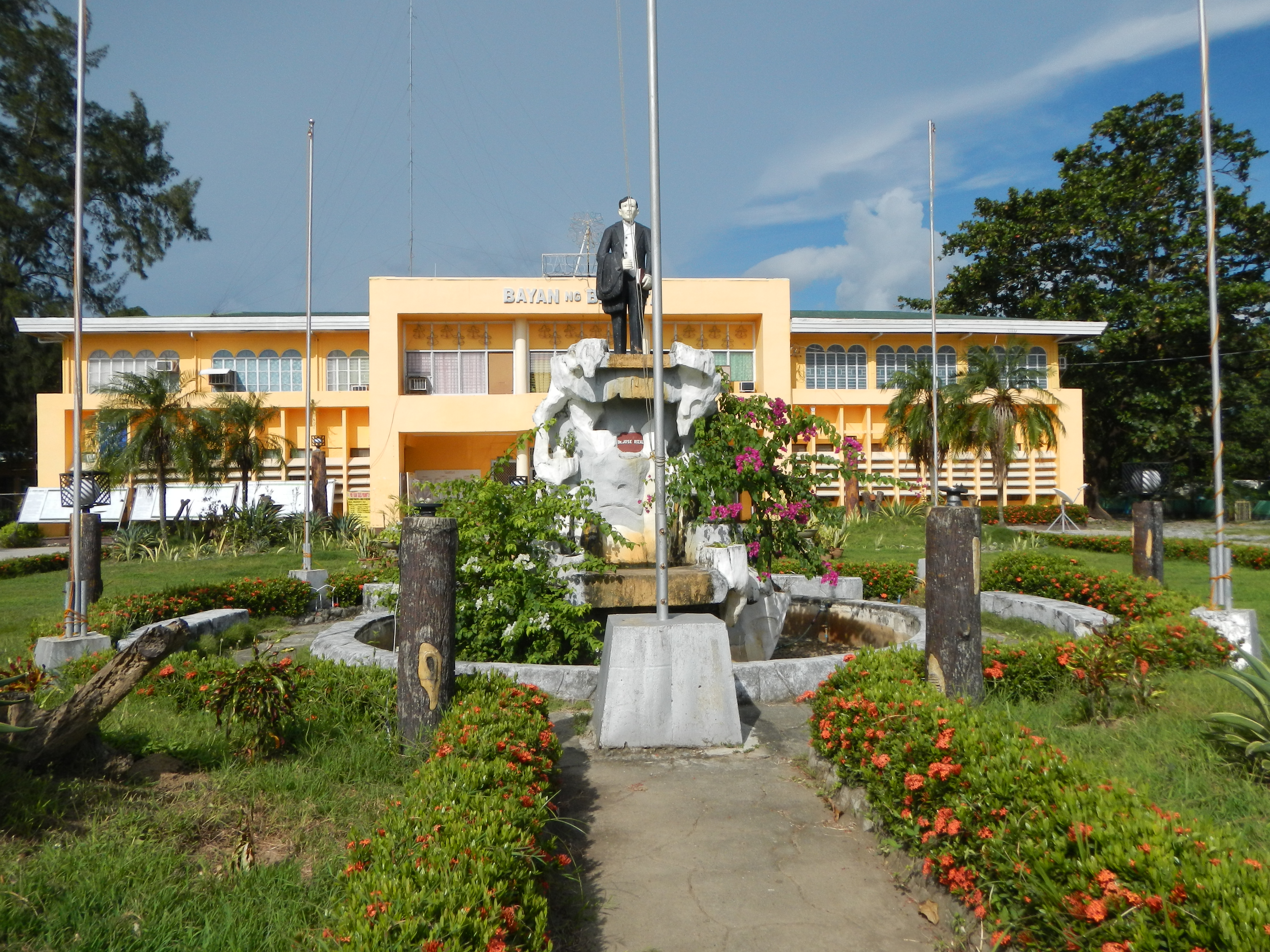
Basista Town Hall

=== Local government ===
Basista, belonging to the second congressional district of the province of Pangasinan, is governed by a mayor designated as its local chief executive and by a municipal council as its legislative body in accordance with the Local Government Code. The mayor, vice mayor, and the councilors are elected directly by the people through an election which is being held every three years.

=== Elected officials ===
Members of the Municipal Council (2022):

- Mayor: Jolly R. Resuello
- Vice Mayor: Dante P. Bustarde
- Councilors:
  - Christian S. Bacani
  - Jake Niccole L. Perez
  - Dominador A. Frias
  - Monica N. Ramos
  - Vanessa F. Baraquio
  - Marino C. Capua
  - Bernard S. Doria
  - Teresita S. Erguiza

== Education ==
The Basista Schools District Office governs all educational institutions within the municipality. It oversees the management and operations of all private and public elementary and high schools.

=== Primary and elementary schools ===
- Alejandro V. Frias Elementary School
- Anambongan Elementary School
- Aquilino Banaag Elementary School
- Basista Central School
- BFF (Bancolita-Frias Family) Learning Academy
- Cabeldatan Elementary School
- Dumpay Elementary School
- Magsaysay Elementary School
- Mary Help of Christians Catholic School
- Obong Elementary School
- Patacbo Elementary School
- Perez Elementary School
- Palma Elementary School

=== Secondary schools ===
- Basista National High School
- Bayoyong National High School
- Dumpay National High School
