= Pangasinan's 2nd congressional district =

Legislative district of the Philippines

- Constituency for the House of Representatives of the Philippines
- Boundary of Pangasinan's 2nd congressional district in Pangasinan
- Location of Pangasinan within the Philippines
- Province: Pangasinan
- Region: Ilocos Region
- Population: 474,712 (2015)
- Electorate: 351,684 (2022)
- Major settlements: 8 LGUs: Municipalities; Aguilar; Basista; Binmaley; Bugallon; Labrador; Lingayen; Mangatarem; Urbiztondo
- Area: 1,080.26 km^{2} (417.09 sq mi)

Current constituency
- Created: 1907
- Representative: Mark Cojuangco
- Political party: NPC
- Congressional bloc: Majority

Pangasinan's 2nd congressional district is one of the six congressional districts of the Philippines in the province of Pangasinan. It has been represented in the House of Representatives of the Philippines since 1916 and earlier in the Philippine Assembly from 1907 to 1916. The district consists of the provincial capital, Lingayen, as well as adjacent municipalities of Aguilar, Basista, Binmaley, Bugallon, Labrador, Mangatarem and Urbiztondo. It is currently represented in the 20th Congress by Mark Cojuangco of the Nationalist People's Coalition (NPC).

== Representation history ==
#	Image	Member	Term of office		Legislature	Party	Electoral history	Constituent LGUs
#	Image	Member	Start	End	Legislature	Party	Electoral history	Constituent LGUs
=== Pangasinan's 2nd district for the Philippine Assembly ===
District created January 9, 1907.
1		Deogracias Reyes	October 16, 1907	June 17, 1909	1st	Nacionalista	Elected in 1907. Died in office.	1907–1916; Binmaley, Dagupan, Mangatarem, San Carlos, Urbiztondo
2		Mariano Padilla	October 16, 1909	October 16, 1912	2nd	Nacionalista	Elected in 1909.	1907–1916; Binmaley, Dagupan, Mangatarem, San Carlos, Urbiztondo
3		Rodrigo D. Pérez	October 16, 1912	October 16, 1916	3rd	Nacionalista	Elected in 1912.	1907–1916; Binmaley, Dagupan, Mangatarem, San Carlos, Urbiztondo
=== Pangasinan's 2nd district for the House of Representatives of the Philippine Islands ===
4		Aquilino Banaag	October 16, 1916	June 3, 1919	4th	Nacionalista	Elected in 1916.	1916–1935; Binmaley, Dagupan, Mangatarem, San Carlos, Urbiztondo
5		Alejandro de Guzmán	June 3, 1919	June 6, 1922	5th	Nacionalista	Elected in 1919.	1916–1935; Binmaley, Dagupan, Mangatarem, San Carlos, Urbiztondo
6		Lamberto Siguión Reyna	June 6, 1922	June 2, 1925	6th	Nacionalista; Colectivista	Elected in 1922.	1916–1935; Binmaley, Dagupan, Mangatarem, San Carlos, Urbiztondo
7		Isidoro Siapno	June 2, 1925	June 5, 1928	7th	Nacionalista; Consolidado	Elected in 1925.	1916–1935; Binmaley, Dagupan, Mangatarem, San Carlos, Urbiztondo
8		Eugenio Pérez	June 5, 1928	September 16, 1935	8th	Nacionalista; Consolidado	Elected in 1928.	1916–1935; Binmaley, Dagupan, Mangatarem, San Carlos, Urbiztondo
8		Eugenio Pérez	June 5, 1928	September 16, 1935	9th	Nacionalista; Consolidado	Re-elected in 1931.	1916–1935; Binmaley, Dagupan, Mangatarem, San Carlos, Urbiztondo
8		Eugenio Pérez	June 5, 1928	September 16, 1935	10th	Nacionalista; Democrático	Re-elected in 1934.	1916–1935; Binmaley, Dagupan, Mangatarem, San Carlos, Urbiztondo
#	Image	Member	Term of office		National Assembly	Party	Electoral history	Constituent LGUs
#	Image	Member	Start	End	National Assembly	Party	Electoral history	Constituent LGUs
=== Pangasinan's 2nd district for the National Assembly (Commonwealth of the Philippines) ===
(8)		Eugenio Pérez	September 16, 1935	December 30, 1941	1st	Nacionalista; Democrático	Re-elected in 1935.	1935–1941; Binmaley, Dagupan, Mangatarem, San Carlos, Urbiztondo
(8)		Eugenio Pérez	September 16, 1935	December 30, 1941	2nd	Nacionalista	Re-elected in 1938.	1935–1941; Binmaley, Dagupan, Mangatarem, San Carlos, Urbiztondo
District dissolved into the two-seat Pangasinan's at-large district for the National Assembly (Second Philippine Republic).
#	Image	Member	Term of office		Common wealth Congress	Party	Electoral history	Constituent LGUs
#	Image	Member	Start	End	Common wealth Congress	Party	Electoral history	Constituent LGUs
=== Pangasinan's 2nd district for the House of Representatives of the Commonwealth of the Philippines ===
District re-created May 24, 1945.
(8)		Eugenio Pérez	June 11, 1945	May 25, 1946	1st	Nacionalista	Re-elected in 1941.	1945–1946; Binmaley, Dagupan, Mangatarem, San Carlos, Urbiztondo
#	Image	Member	Term of office		Congress	Party	Electoral history	Constituent LGUs
#	Image	Member	Start	End	Congress	Party	Electoral history	Constituent LGUs
=== Pangasinan's 2nd district for the House of Representatives of the Philippines ===
(8)		Eugenio Pérez	May 25, 1946	August 4, 1957	1st	Liberal	Re-elected in 1946.	1946–1961; Binmaley, Dagupan, Mangatarem, San Carlos, Urbiztondo
(8)		Eugenio Pérez	May 25, 1946	August 4, 1957	2nd	Liberal	Re-elected in 1949.	1946–1961; Binmaley, Dagupan, Mangatarem, San Carlos, Urbiztondo
(8)		Eugenio Pérez	May 25, 1946	August 4, 1957	3rd	Liberal	Re-elected in 1953. Died in office.	1946–1961; Binmaley, Dagupan, Mangatarem, San Carlos, Urbiztondo
9		Ángel B. Fernández	December 30, 1957	December 30, 1965	4th	Liberal	Elected in 1957.	1946–1961; Binmaley, Dagupan, Mangatarem, San Carlos, Urbiztondo
9		Ángel B. Fernández	December 30, 1957	December 30, 1965	5th	Liberal	Re-elected in 1961.	1961–1965; Basista, Binmaley, Dagupan, Mangatarem, San Carlos, Urbiztondo
10		Jack Laureano Soriano	December 30, 1965	December 30, 1969	6th	Nacionalista	Elected in 1965.	1965–1969; Binmaley, Dagupan, Mangatarem, San Carlos, Urbiztondo
11		Jose de Venecia Jr.	December 30, 1969	September 23, 1972	7th	Liberal	Elected in 1969. Removed from office after imposition of martial law.	1969–1972; Basista, Binmaley, Dagupan, Mangatarem, San Carlos, Urbiztondo
District dissolved into the twelve-seat Region I's at-large district for the Interim Batasang Pambansa, followed by the six-seat Pangasinan's at-large district for the Regular Batasang Pambansa.
District re-created February 2, 1987.
12		Antonio E. Bengson III	June 30, 1987	June 30, 1992	8th	Lakas ng Bansa	Elected in 1987.	1987–present Aguilar, Basista, Binmaley, Bugallon, Labrador, Lingayen, Mangatarem, Urbiztondo
13		Chris F. Mendoza	June 30, 1992	June 30, 1995	9th	Lakas	Elected in 1992.	1987–present Aguilar, Basista, Binmaley, Bugallon, Labrador, Lingayen, Mangatarem, Urbiztondo
(12)		Antonio E. Bengson III	June 30, 1995	June 30, 1998	10th	Lakas	Elected in 1995.	1987–present Aguilar, Basista, Binmaley, Bugallon, Labrador, Lingayen, Mangatarem, Urbiztondo
14		Teodoro C. Cruz	June 30, 1998	June 30, 2001	11th	LAMMP	Elected in 1998.	1987–present Aguilar, Basista, Binmaley, Bugallon, Labrador, Lingayen, Mangatarem, Urbiztondo
15		Amado Espino Jr.	June 30, 2001	June 30, 2007	12th	Lakas	Elected in 2001.	1987–present Aguilar, Basista, Binmaley, Bugallon, Labrador, Lingayen, Mangatarem, Urbiztondo
15		Amado Espino Jr.	June 30, 2001	June 30, 2007	13th	Lakas	Re-elected in 2004.	1987–present Aguilar, Basista, Binmaley, Bugallon, Labrador, Lingayen, Mangatarem, Urbiztondo
16		Victor Aguedo E. Agbayani	June 30, 2007	June 30, 2010	14th	Lakas	Elected in 2007.	1987–present Aguilar, Basista, Binmaley, Bugallon, Labrador, Lingayen, Mangatarem, Urbiztondo
16		Victor Aguedo E. Agbayani	June 30, 2007	June 30, 2010	14th	Liberal	Elected in 2007.	1987–present Aguilar, Basista, Binmaley, Bugallon, Labrador, Lingayen, Mangatarem, Urbiztondo
17		Leopoldo N. Bataoil	June 30, 2010	June 30, 2019	15th	Lakas	Elected in 2010.	1987–present Aguilar, Basista, Binmaley, Bugallon, Labrador, Lingayen, Mangatarem, Urbiztondo
17		Leopoldo N. Bataoil	June 30, 2010	June 30, 2019	15th	NUP	Elected in 2010.	1987–present Aguilar, Basista, Binmaley, Bugallon, Labrador, Lingayen, Mangatarem, Urbiztondo
17		Leopoldo N. Bataoil	June 30, 2010	June 30, 2019	16th	NPC	Re-elected in 2013.	1987–present Aguilar, Basista, Binmaley, Bugallon, Labrador, Lingayen, Mangatarem, Urbiztondo
17		Leopoldo N. Bataoil	June 30, 2010	June 30, 2019	16th	Liberal	Re-elected in 2013.	1987–present Aguilar, Basista, Binmaley, Bugallon, Labrador, Lingayen, Mangatarem, Urbiztondo
17		Leopoldo N. Bataoil	June 30, 2010	June 30, 2019	17th	NUP	Re-elected in 2016.	1987–present Aguilar, Basista, Binmaley, Bugallon, Labrador, Lingayen, Mangatarem, Urbiztondo
18		Jumel Anthony I. Espino	June 30, 2019	June 30, 2022	18th	PDP–Laban	Elected in 2019.	1987–present Aguilar, Basista, Binmaley, Bugallon, Labrador, Lingayen, Mangatarem, Urbiztondo
19		Marcos Juan Bruno O. Cojuangco	June 30, 2022	Incumbent	19th	NPC	Elected in 2022.	1987–present Aguilar, Basista, Binmaley, Bugallon, Labrador, Lingayen, Mangatarem, Urbiztondo
19		Marcos Juan Bruno O. Cojuangco	June 30, 2022	Incumbent	20th	NPC	Re-elected in 2025.	1987–present Aguilar, Basista, Binmaley, Bugallon, Labrador, Lingayen, Mangatarem, Urbiztondo

== Election results ==
=== 2022 ===
2022 Philippine House of Representatives elections
Party	Candidate	Votes	%
NPC	Mark Cojuangco	150,472	51.74
PDP–Laban	Jumel Espino (incumbent)	135,888	46.73
PPM	Roberto "Butch" Merrera Jr.	4,441	1.53
Total votes		203,680	100.00
NPC gain from PDP–Laban			

=== 2019 ===
2019 Philippine House of Representatives elections
Party	Candidate	Votes	%
PDP–Laban	Jumel Espino	129,371	52.19
Nacionalista	Raul Sison	109,639	44.23
Independent	Roberto "Butch" Merrera Jr.	8,864	3.58
Total votes		247,874	100.00
PDP–Laban gain from NUP			

=== 2016 ===
2016 Philippine House of Representatives elections
Party	Candidate	Votes	%
NUP	Leopoldo Bataoil	172,078	
Invalid or blank votes		73,882	
Total votes		245,960	
NUP hold			

=== 2013 ===
2013 Philippine House of Representatives elections
Party	Candidate	Votes	%
NPC	Leopoldo Bataoil	154,466	67.21
Liberal	Kim Lokin	53,394	23.23
Margin of victory		101,072	43.98%
Invalid or blank votes		21,985	9.56
Total votes		229,825	100.00
NPC hold			

=== 2010 ===
2010 Philippine House of Representatives elections
Party	Candidate	Votes	%
Lakas–Kampi	Leopoldo Bataoil	74,705	39.32
NPC	Kim Bernardo Lokin	36,087	18.99
Liberal	Arthel Caronoñgan	32,602	17.16
Nacionalista	Nestor Reyes	24,337	12.81
Independent	Arsenio Merrera	19,335	10.18
KBL	Franco de Guzman	1,959	1.03
Independent	Ron Vergara	963	0.51
Valid ballots		189.998	89.37
Invalid or blank votes		22,594	10.63
Total votes		212,582	100.00
Lakas–Kampi gain from Liberal			

== See also ==
- Legislative districts of Pangasinan

House of Representatives of the Philippines
Preceded by Iloilo's 1st congressional district	Home district of the speaker May 25, 1946 – December 30, 1953	Succeeded by Batangas's 3rd congressional district
