= Rodrigo D. Pérez =

Filipino lawyer and politician (1882–1931)

The Honorable Rodrigo Diego Pérez
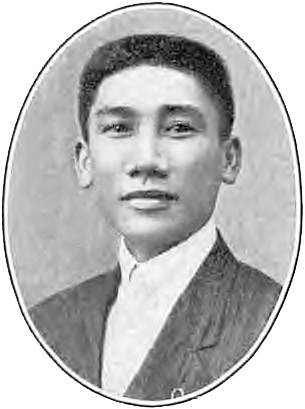
- Pérez official portrait during the 3rd Philippine Legislature.

Member of the Philippine Assembly from Pangasinan's 2nd district
- In office October 16, 1912 – October 16, 1916
- Preceded by: Mariano Padilla
- Succeeded by: Aquilino Banaag

Personal details
- Born: Rodrigo Diego Pérez y Cuison; September 19, 1882; Dagupan, Pangasinan, Captaincy General of the Philippines
- Died: June 1, 1931 (aged 48); Dagupan, Pangasinan, Philippine Islands
- Political party: Nacionalista

Rodrigo Diego Pérez y Cuison (September 19, 1882 – June 1, 1931) was a Filipino lawyer and politician.

== Early life and education ==
He was born in the municipality of Dagupan, Pangasinan, Philippines on September 19, 1882. He had his primary education in his hometown, as well as the first three years of secondary education. The last two years of the course he took in Manila, where he obtained the title Bachelor of Arts. He studied for the legal profession at the Royal Academy of Jurisprudence and Legislation and in the Escuela de Leyes from 1902 to 1905.

== Career ==
In 1909, together with others, he founded a weekly vernacular publication in Dagupan called Say Pangkakasakey. In October 1910 he was admitted by the Supreme Court to the practice of law, and in January of the following year he began his professional practice in his province.

He is the first lawyer and Assemblyman of Dagupan. He was elected by a majority of 935 votes over fellow nationalist members. He was an honorary member of the Club Comercial de Dagupan.

After serving as member of the Second National Assembly from 1912 to 1916, he was appointed Assistant Provincial Fiscal of Pangasinan. In 1920, he became the City Fiscal of Baguio. Subsequently, he became Provincial Fiscal of Cavite in 1924, Provincial Fiscal of Tarlac in 1926, and Provincial Fiscal of Batangas in 1927. In 1931, he was appointed Judge of the Court of First Instance, but died on June 1 that year before he could take his oath of office. In his honor, one of Dagupan's main commercial road was named after him, Perez Boulevard.

== Bibliography ==
- Say Pangkakasakey (1909)
