= Binmaley =

Municipality in Pangasinan, Philippines

- Municipality
- Municipality of Binmaley
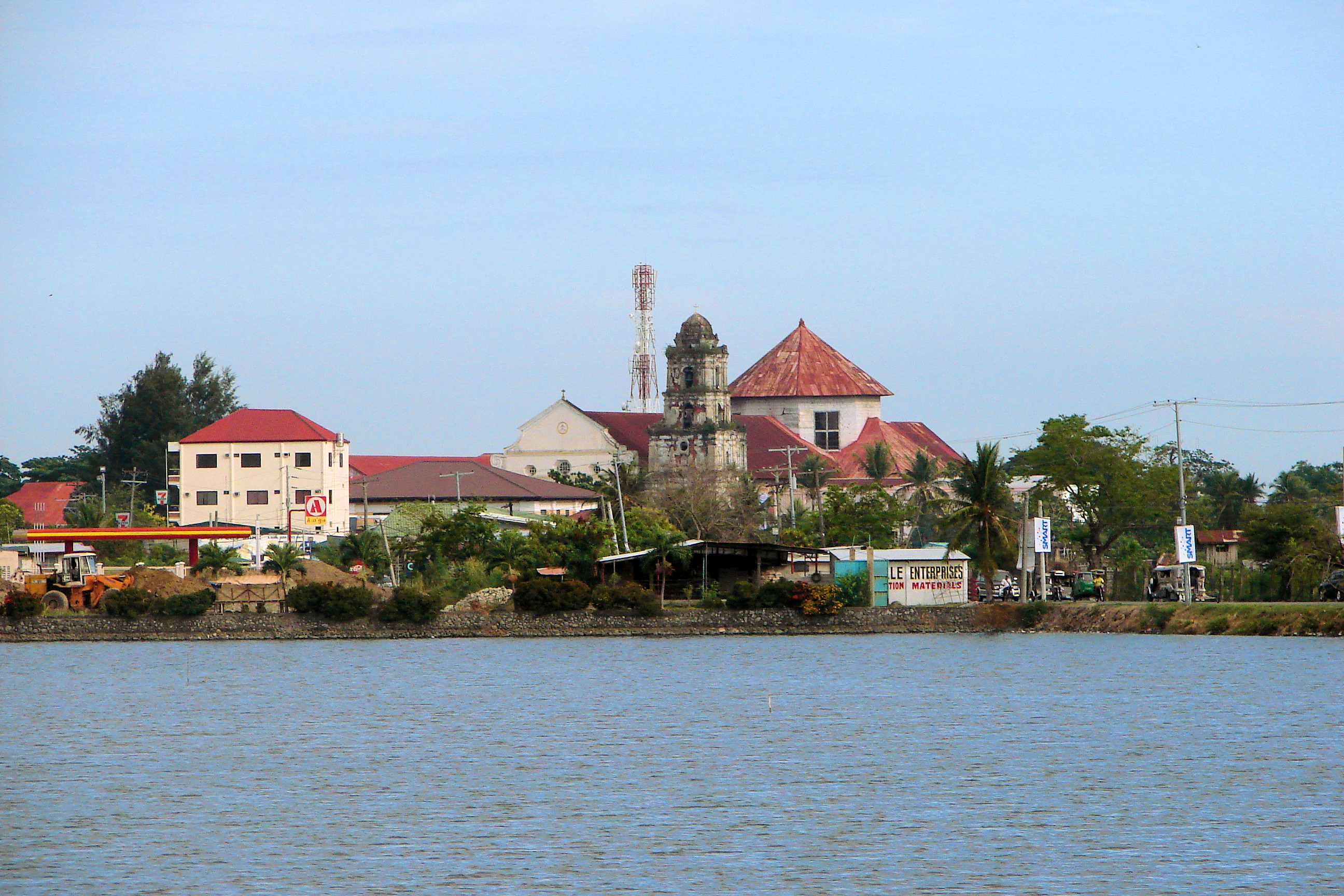
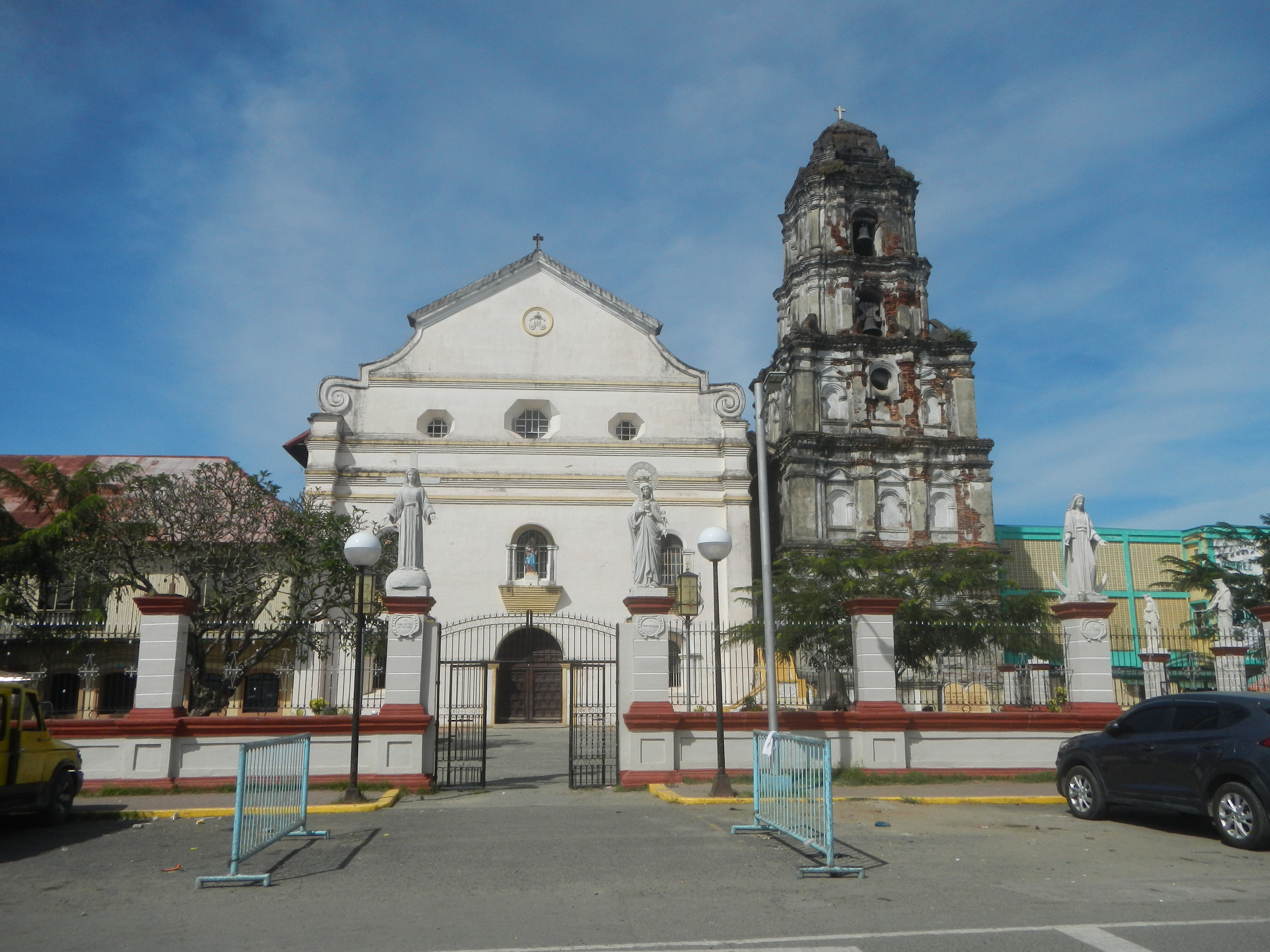
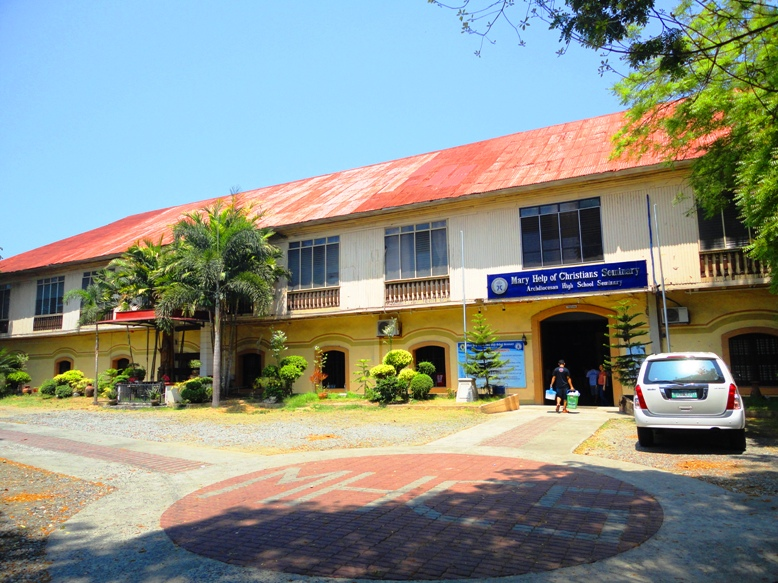
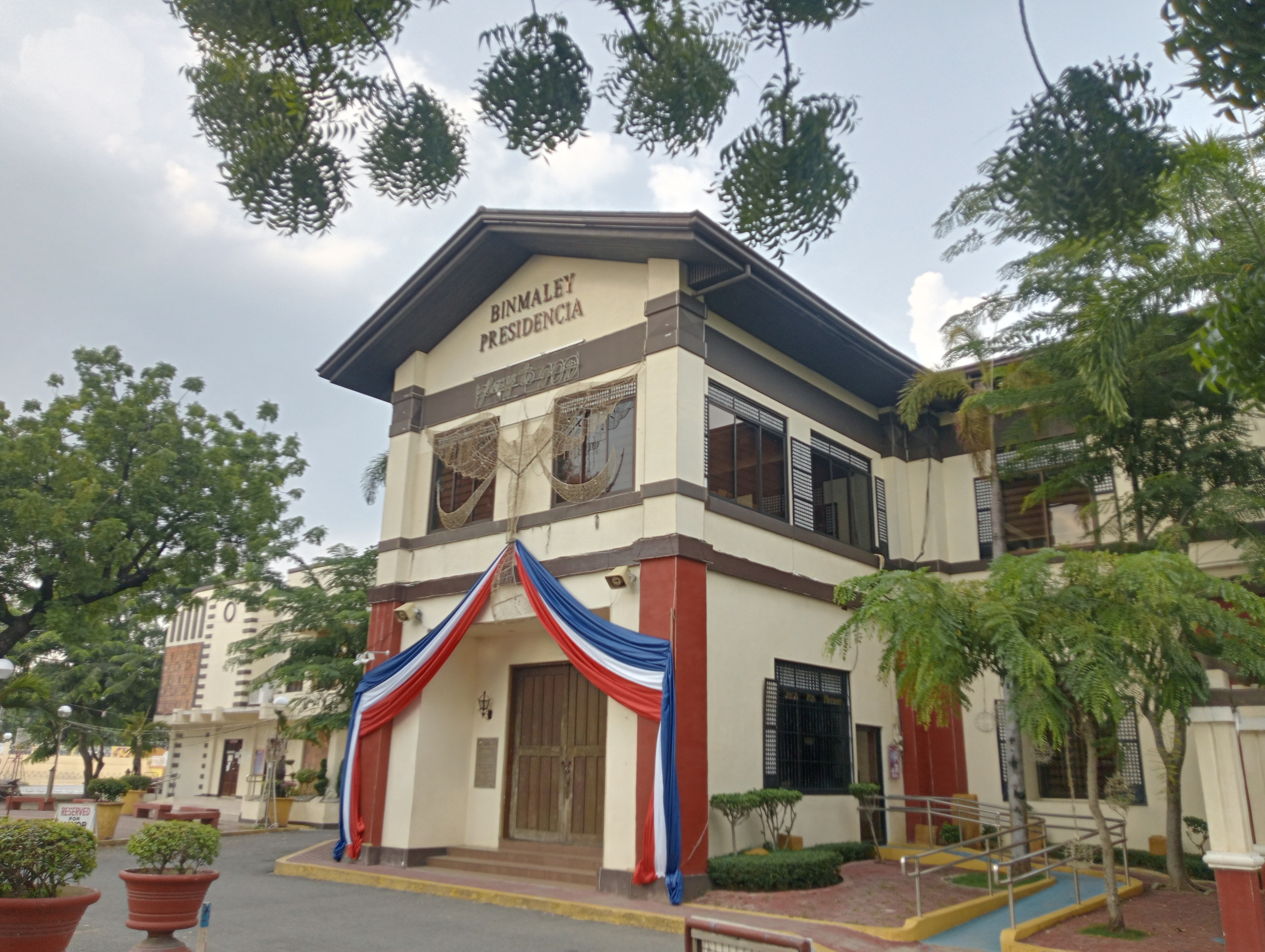
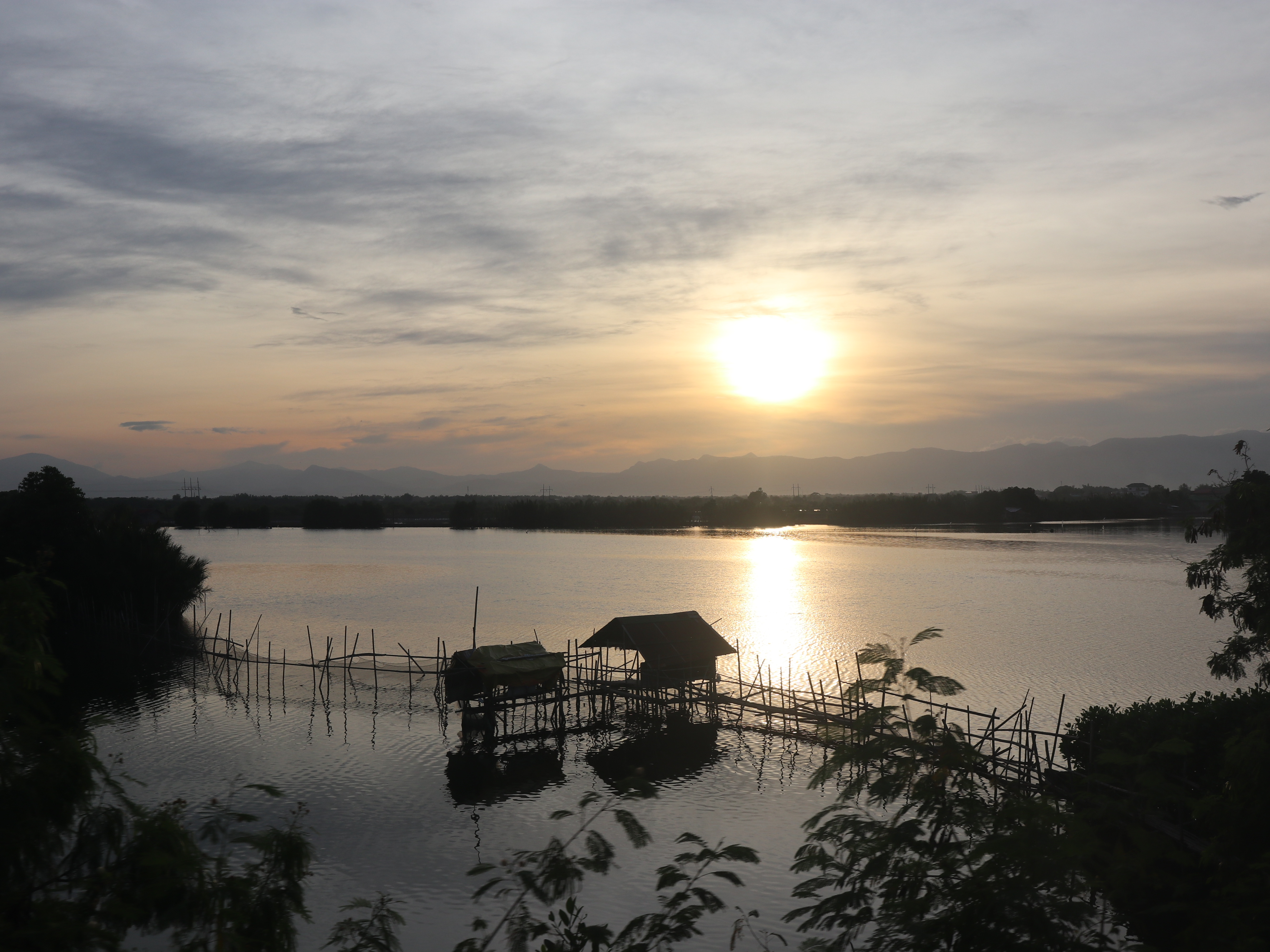
- Clockwise from top: Skyline of Binmaley; Mary Help of Christians High School Seminary; Basing River; Binmaley Presidencia; and Our Lady of Purification Parish.

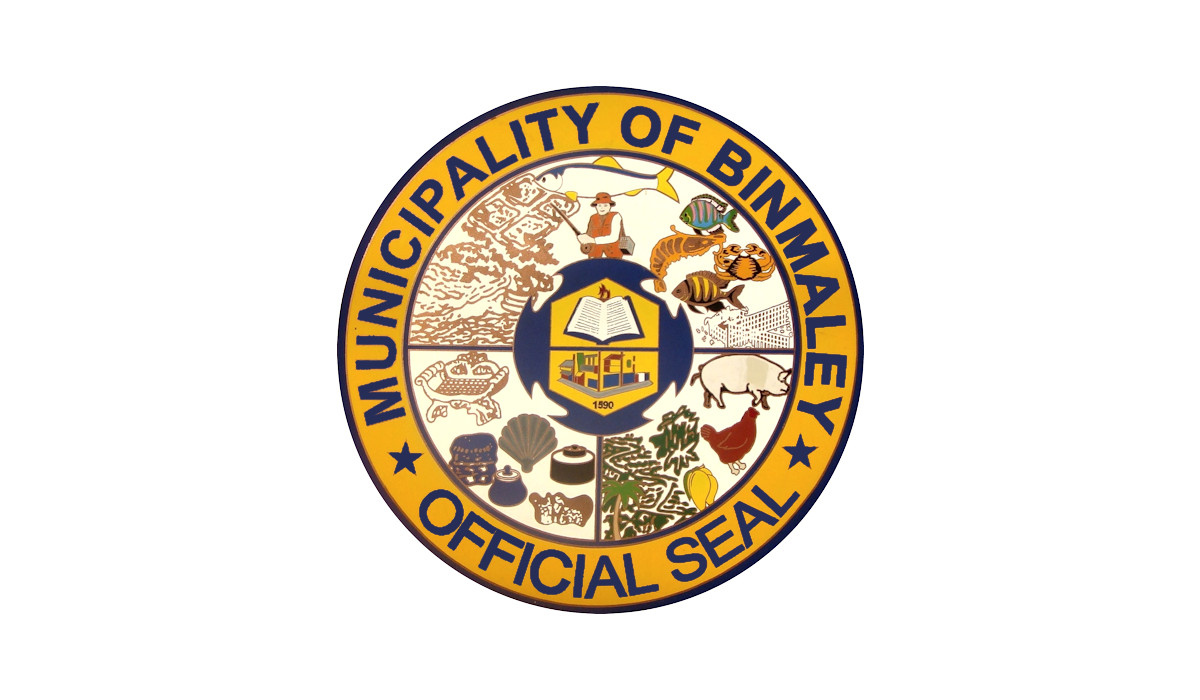
- Flag Seal

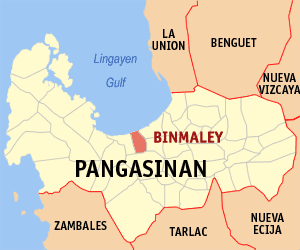
- Map of Pangasinan with Binmaley highlighted
- Interactive map of Binmaley
- Location within the Philippines
- Coordinates: 16°01′56″N 120°16′09″E
- Country: Philippines
- Region: Ilocos Region
- Province: Pangasinan
- District: 2nd district
- Founded: February 1, 1590
- Barangays: 33 (see Barangays)

Government
  - Type: Sangguniang Bayan
  - Mayor: Pedro Merrera III
  - Vice Mayor: Amelito Sison
  - Representative: Mark Cojuangco
  - Municipal Council: Members: Ariel Dela Concha; Jallen Alipio; Joel Jose Carrera; Rolando Ferrer; Urbano Delos Angeles III; Gericho Francisco; Aurora Gene Cagaoan
  - Electorate: 62,485 voters (2025)

Area
  - Total: 118.50 km^{2} (45.75 sq mi)
- Highest elevation: 24 m (79 ft)
- Lowest elevation: −2 m (−6.6 ft)

Population (2024 census)
  - Total: 88,006
  - Density: 742.67/km^{2} (1,923.5/sq mi)
  - Households: 20,871
- Demonym: Binmalenian

Economy
  - Income class: 1st municipal income class
  - Poverty incidence: 13.07% (2023)
  - Revenue: ₱ 328.5 million (2024)
  - Assets: ₱ 1,176 million (2024)
  - Expenditure: ₱ 249.2 million (2024)
  - Liabilities: ₱ 177 million (2024)

Service provider
  - Electricity: Central Pangasinan Electric Cooperative (CENPELCO)
- Time zone: UTC+8 (PST)
- ZIP code: 2417
- PSGC: 0105513000
- IDD : area code: +63 (0)75
- Native languages: Pangasinan; Ilocano; Tagalog

Binmaley, officially the Municipality of Binmaley (Pangasinan: Baley na Binmaley; Ilocano: Ili ti Binmaley; Tagalog: Bayan ng Binmaley), is a municipality in the province of Pangasinan, Philippines. According to the 2024 census, it has a population of 88,006 people.

== Etymology ==
The town is thought to be named after the "Binmaley" tribe, the original inhabitants of the area. These tribespeople were known for their fishing skills and agricultural practices.

== History ==
During the Spanish colonial period, Binmaley became a significant trading center, particularly for salt and fish. The town thrived under Spanish rule. Its economy was fueled by its abundant natural resources.

After the Spanish-American War, Binmaley became part of the American-controlled Philippines and continued its growth as a fishing and agricultural hub.

Today, Binmaley is recognized for its cultural events, coastal environment, and aquaculture industry, particularly its production of bangús (milkfish, Chanos chanos). The municipality features seaside areas along the Lingayen Gulf, including Bonuan Beach, which serve as local tourism and recreation sites. Binmaley hosts annual events such as the Pista ng Parul (Festival of Lights) and the Binmaley Fish Festival, both highlighting community traditions and local industries. The town also contains historical structures, including the Binmaley Church and the Binmaley Municipal Hall, which reflect its historical development past.

From January 8–9, 1945, the forces of US General Douglas MacArthur used the town’s beach - designated as “Yellow Beach" - alongside beaches in Lingayen, Dagupan, and San Fabián for amphibious assault operations to liberate Luzon from Japanese occupation during World War II.

== Geography ==
The Municipality of Binmaley is located along the western coast of Pangasinan facing the Lingayen Gulf, in between Lingayen and Dagupan.

Binmaley is situated 5.27 kilometres (3.27 mi) from the provincial capital Lingayen, and 225.08 kilometres (139.86 mi) from the country's capital city of Manila.

=== Barangays ===
Binmaley is politically subdivided into 33 barangays. Each barangay consists of puroks and some have sitios.

- Amancoro
- Balagan
- Balogo
- Basing
- Baybay Lopez
- Baybay Polong
- Biec
- Buenlag
- Calit
- Caloocan Dupo
- Caloocan Norte
- Caloocan Sur
- Camaley
- Canaoalan
- Dulag
- Gayaman
- Linoc
- Lomboy
- Nagpalangan
- Malindong
- Manat
- Naguilayan
- Pallas
- Papagueyan
- Parayao
- Poblacion
- Pototan
- Sabangan
- Salapingao
- San Isidro Norte
- San Isidro Sur
- Santa Rosa
- Tombor

=== Climate ===
Climate data for Binmaley, Pangasinan
Month	Jan	Feb	Mar	Apr	May	Jun	Jul	Aug	Sep	Oct	Nov	Dec	Year
Mean daily maximum °C (°F)	31 (88)	31 (88)	33 (91)	34 (93)	34 (93)	33 (91)	32 (90)	31 (88)	31 (88)	32 (90)	31 (88)	31 (88)	32 (90)
Mean daily minimum °C (°F)	21 (70)	21 (70)	23 (73)	25 (77)	25 (77)	25 (77)	25 (77)	24 (75)	24 (75)	24 (75)	23 (73)	22 (72)	24 (74)
Average precipitation mm (inches)	4.3 (0.17)	19.1 (0.75)	27.3 (1.07)	45.2 (1.78)	153.3 (6.04)	271.3 (10.68)	411.1 (16.19)	532 (20.9)	364.4 (14.35)	182.5 (7.19)	56.3 (2.22)	24.4 (0.96)	2,091.2 (82.3)
Average rainy days	3	2	3	5	14	17	22	23	21	13	7	4	134
Source: World Weather Online

== Demographics ==
Population census of Binmaley
Year	Pop.	±% p.a.
1903	16,439	—
1918	18,243	+0.70%
1939	20,455	+0.55%
1948	26,501	+2.92%
1960	32,127	+1.62%
1970	40,645	+2.38%
1975	43,543	+1.39%
1980	47,332	+1.68%
1990	59,601	+2.33%
1995	62,375	+0.86%
2000	72,625	+3.32%
2007	76,214	+0.67%
2010	78,702	+1.18%
2015	83,052	+1.03%
2020	86,881	+0.95%
2024	88,006	+0.31%
Source: Philippine Statistics Authority

== Economy ==
Poverty incidence of Binmaley (%)

Source: Philippine Statistics Authority

The town is famous for its bangus (milkfish) aqua-culture, due to the existence of its numerous fishponds (pokok in the Pangasinan language). However, because of constant siltation over the past several years from mine tailings upstream from Agno River (due to mine operations in neighboring Benguet Province), and the overuse of artificial fish feeds, the bangus industry has suffered from fishkill, fewer viable fishponds and lower harvests. As a result, many formerly productive fishponds have been converted into large commercial and residential lots. This phenomenon is beginning to seriously threaten the unique Binmaley fishpond industry. Current Government action is inadequate due to strong pressures from other competing commercial interests, not to mention fishfeed producers.

== Government ==
=== Local government ===
Binmaley, belonging to the second congressional district of the province of Pangasinan, is governed by a mayor designated as its local chief executive and by a municipal council as its legislative body in accordance with the Local Government Code. The mayor, vice mayor, and the councilors are elected directly by the people through an election which is being held every three years.

=== Elected officials ===
List of Elected Officials of Binmaley (2022–2025)
Position	Name
Mayor	Pedro A. Merrera III
Vice-Mayor	Simplicio D. Rosario
Councilors	Amelito A. Sison
Councilors	Ariel Z. Dela Concha
Councilors	Jallen F. Alipio
Councilors	Joel Jose A. Carrera
Councilors	Rolando D. Ferrer
Councilors	Urbano D.C. Delos Angeles III
Councilors	Gericho C. Francisco
Councilors	Aurora Gene Z. Cagaoan

== Culture ==
Binmaley, is famously known for its "Sigay Festival". The Pangasinan word sigay broadly translates to harvest, or a time to gather the rich yields of the farm, the sea, the ponds and the rivers. It also relates to a contraction of the words silew, meaning light, and gayaga, meaning merriment. It was Mayor Lorenzo "Enzo" Cerezo who pioneered and founded "Sigay Festival".

=== Heritage ===
Binmaley's town center has a Neo classical church dating back to the 17th century. It also became famous throughout the Philippines for the outstanding academic achievements of students (and its distinctive corps of military cadets) from its Binmaley Catholic High School, especially when it was headed by a German priest, Fr. Leo Behneke, in the 1960s and 1970s. Its name roughly means "the place which became a town" or "went to town" in the Pangasinan language.

== Education ==
There are two schools district offices which govern all educational institutions within the municipality. They oversee the management and operations of all private and public elementary and high schools. These are Binmaley I Schools District Office, and Binmaley II Schools District Office.

=== Primary and elementary schools ===
- Balagan Elementary School
- Balogo Elementary School
- Basing Elementary School
- Baybay Elementary School
- Biec Elementary School
- Binmaley I Central School
- Binmaley Catholic School
- Binmaley North Elementary School
- Binmaley School of Fisheries
- Buenlag Elementary School
- Calit Elementary School
- Caloocan Norte Elementary School
- Caloocan Sur Elementary School
- Camaley Central School
- Canaoalan Elementary School
- Dulag Elementary School
- Dupo Elementary School
- Gayaman Elementary School
- Gleamers Academy
- Jesus the Nazarene Academy
- Linoc Elementary School
- Lomboy Elementary School
- Malindong Elementary School
- Manat Elementary School
- Mary Help of Christians Seminary
- Nagpalangan Elementary School
- Naguilayan Elementary School
- Pallas-Papagueyan Elementary School
- Parayao Centro Elementary School
- Pototan Elementary School
- Sabangan Elementary School
- San Isidro Sur Elementary School
- Sta. Rosa Elementary School
- Tombor Elementary School
- UCCP Binmaley Ecumenical Learning Center

=== Secondary schools ===
- Camaley National High School
- Dulag National High School
- Parayao National High School

== Images ==
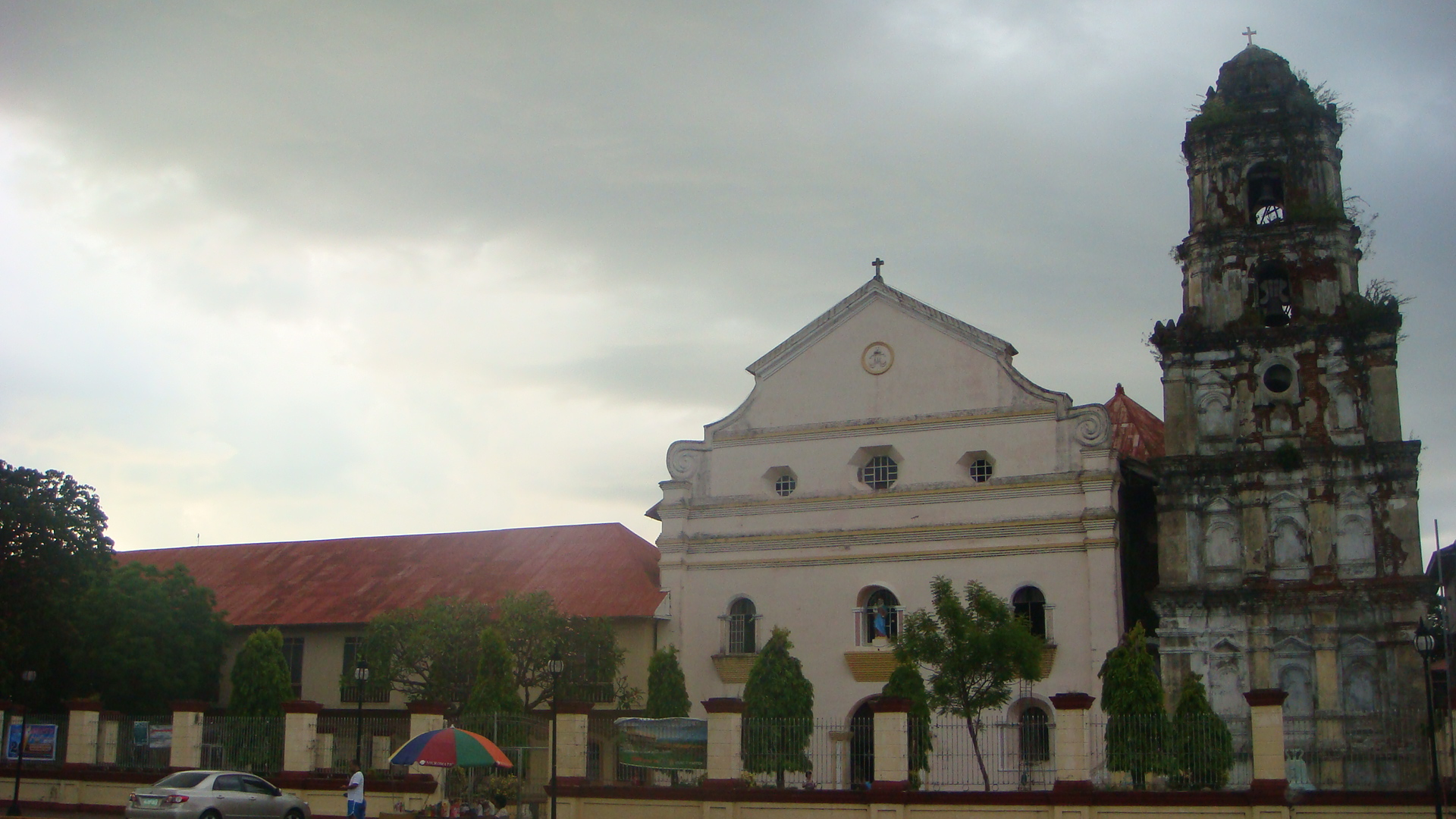
The Our Lady of the Purification Parish Church

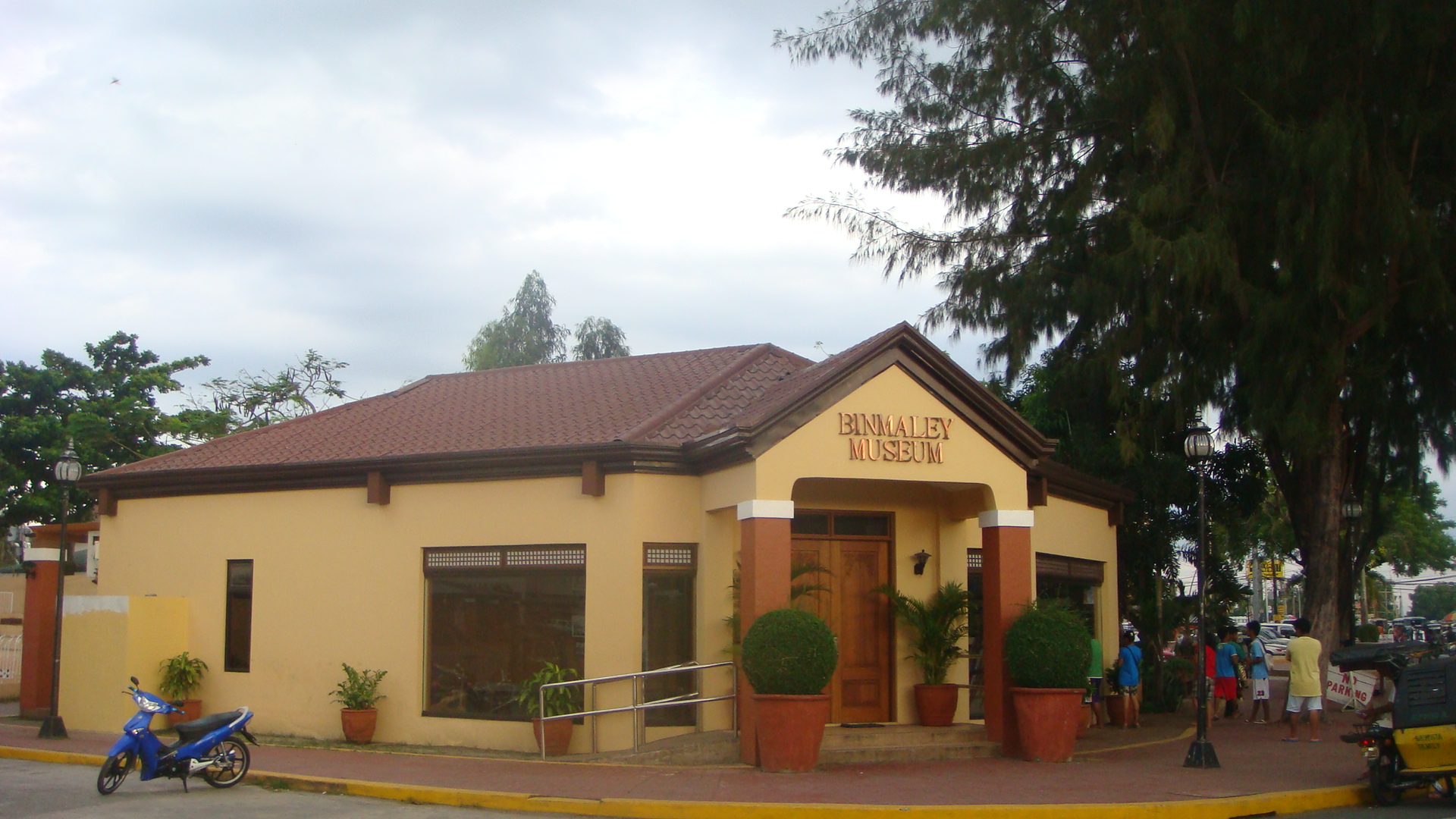
Binmaley Museum

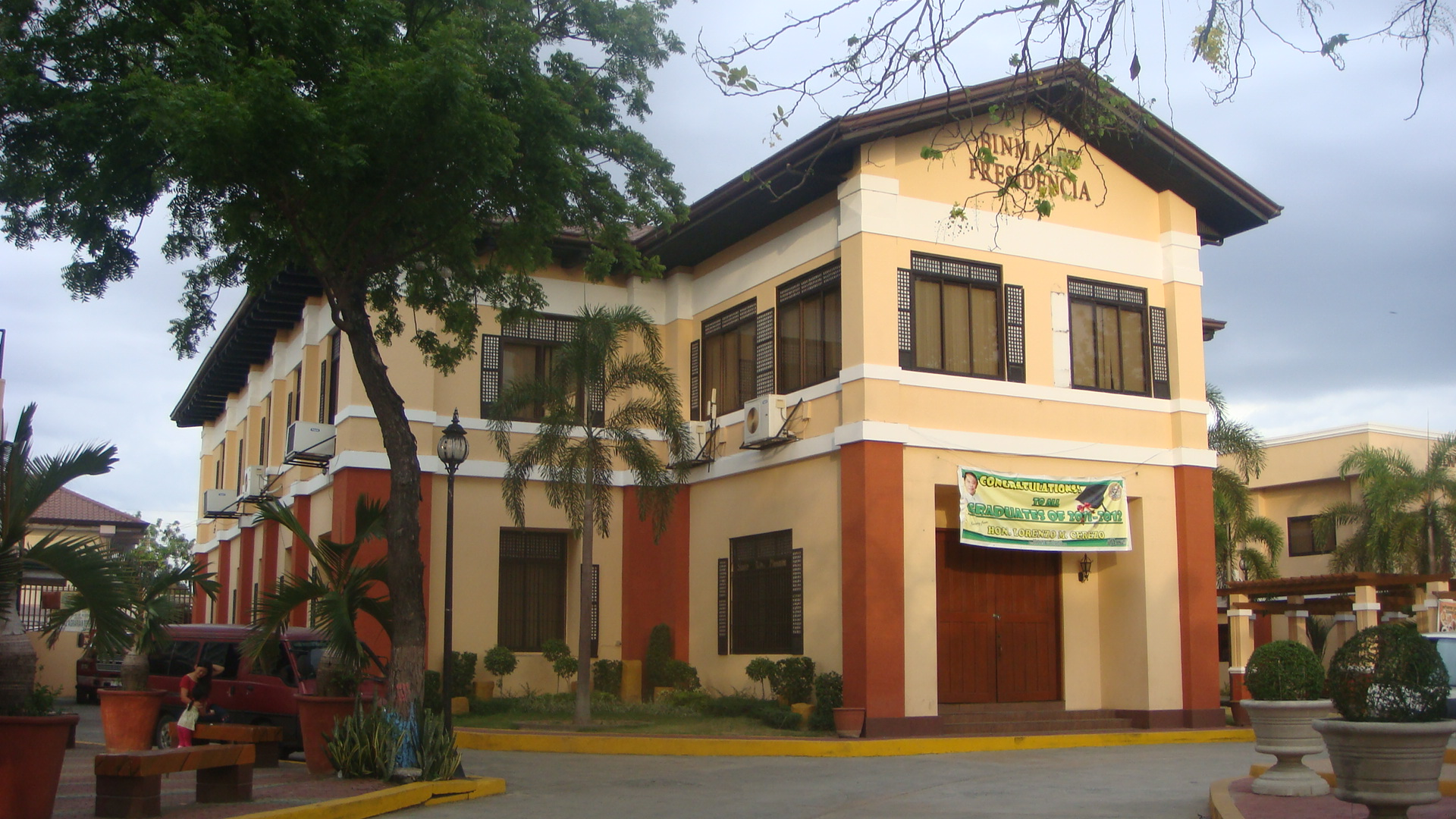
Binmaley Presidencia

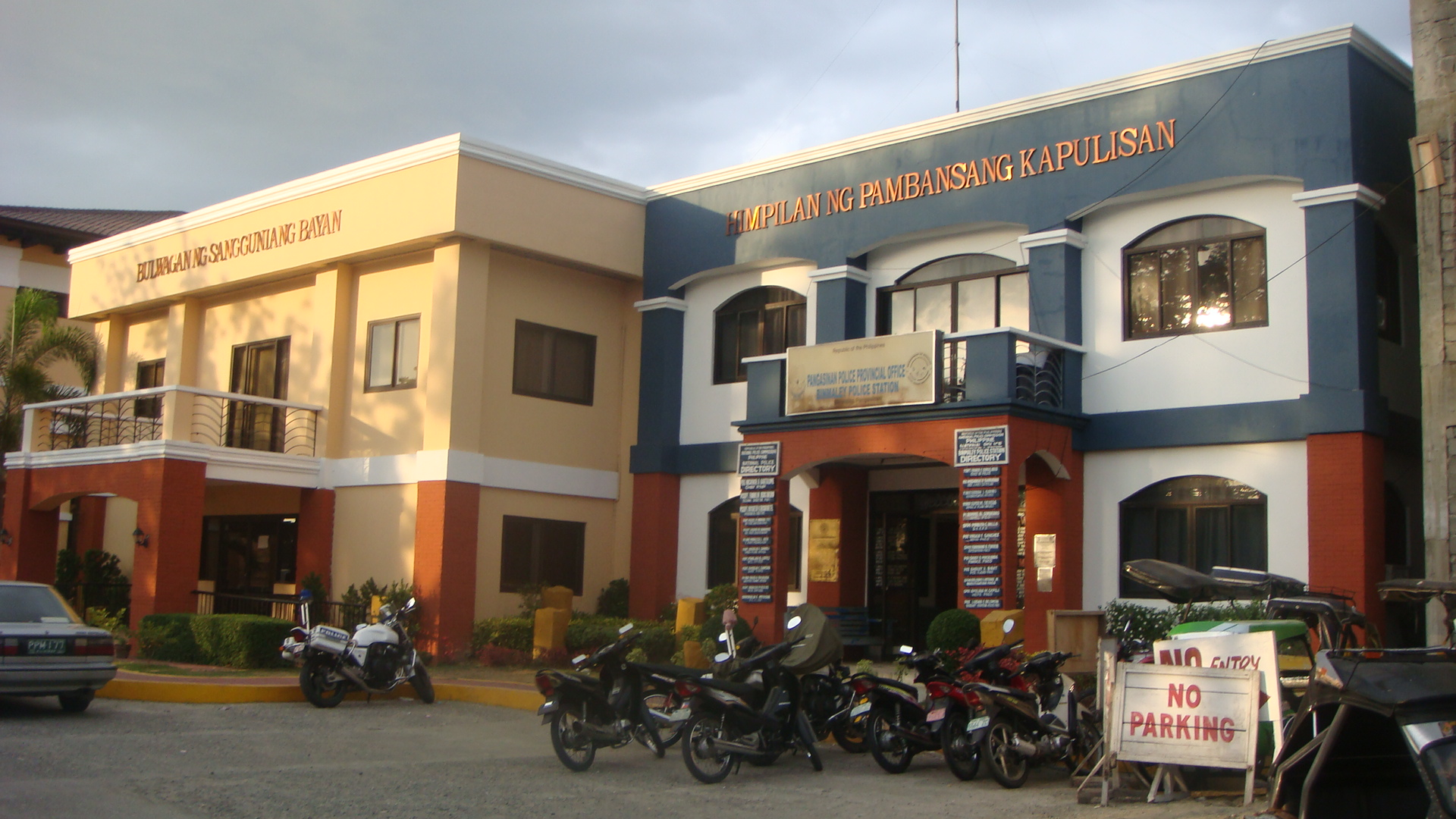
Bulwagan ng Sangguniang Bayan at Himpilan ng Pambansang Kapulisan

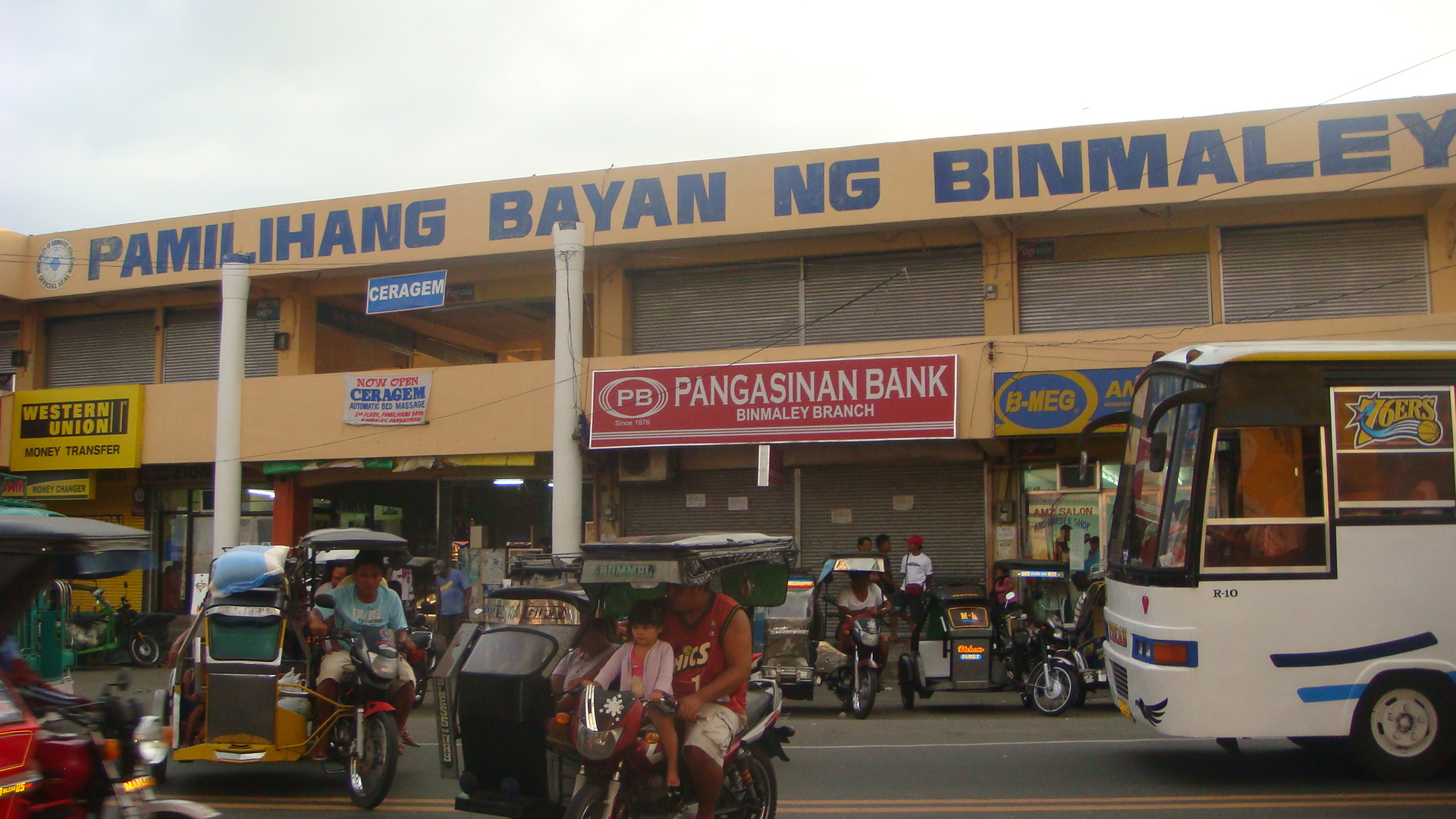
Pamilihang Bayan ng Binmaley

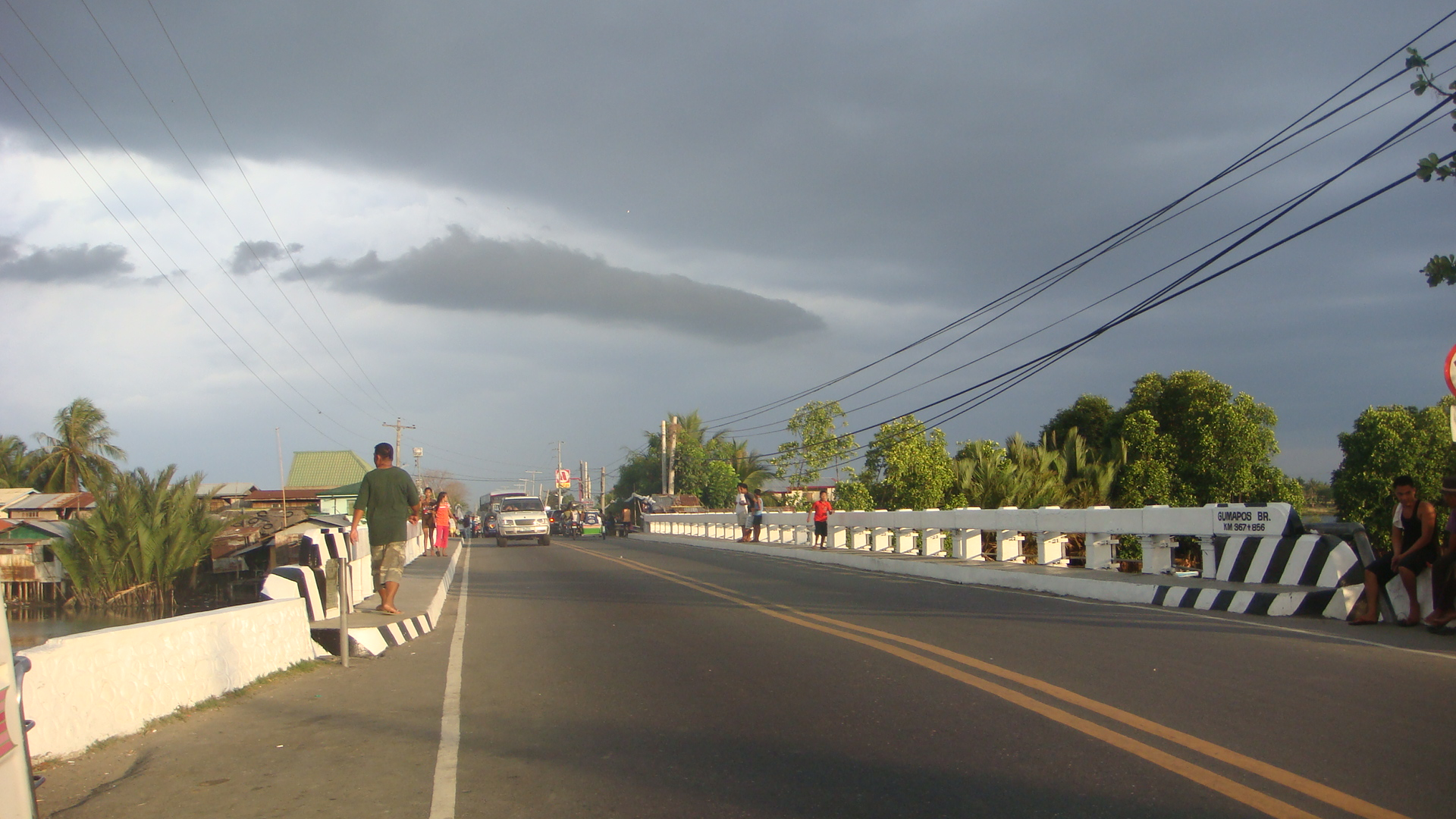
Manat river & Gumapos Bridge

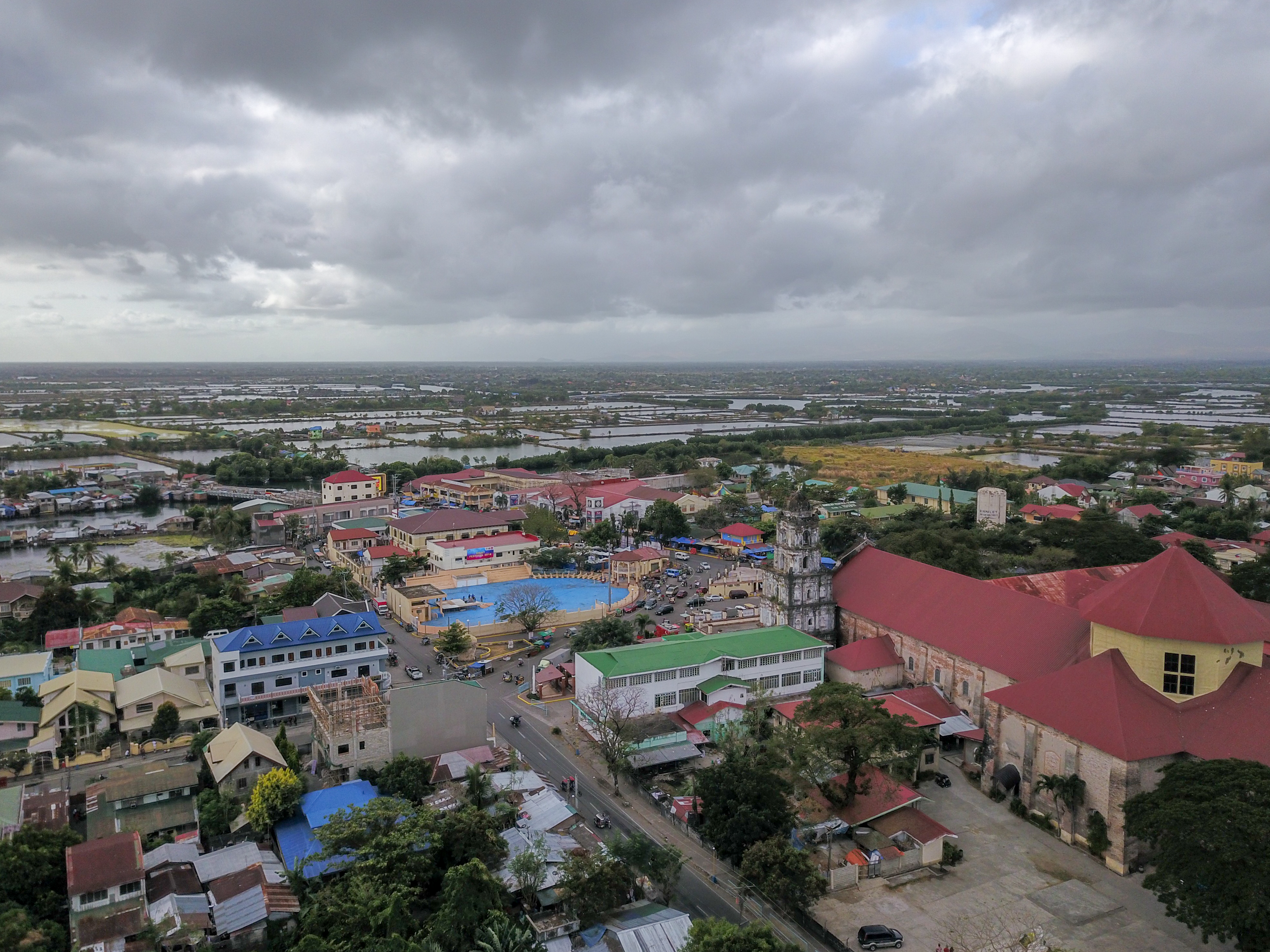
Aerial View of Binmaley, Pangasinan

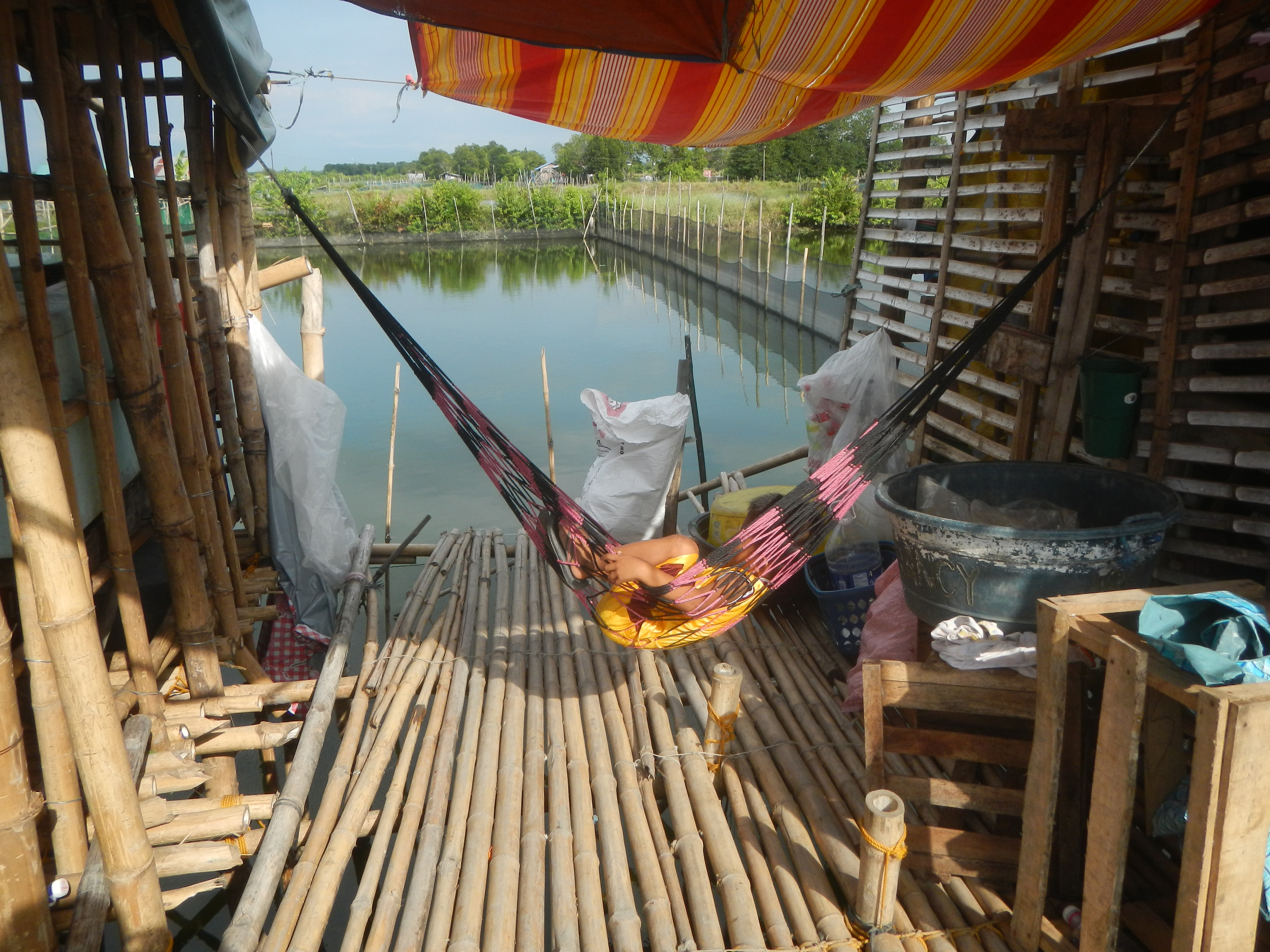
Near Dagupan Road
