= Mark Cojuangco =

Filipino politician and businessman

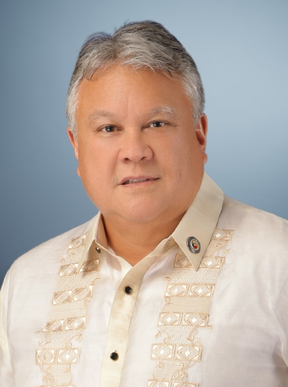
- Official portrait, 2025

Member of the Philippine House of Representatives from Pangasinan
- Incumbent
- Assumed office June 30, 2022
- Preceded by: Jumel Anthony Espino
- Constituency: 2nd district
- In office June 30, 2001 – June 30, 2010
- Preceded by: Amadeo Perez, Jr.
- Succeeded by: Ma. Carmen "Kimi" S. Cojuangco
- Constituency: 5th district

Personal details
- Born: Marcos Juan Bruno Oppen Cojuangco; October 6, 1957 (age 69) Ermita, Manila, Philippines
- Party: NPC (2001–present)
- Spouse: Ma. Carmen "Kimi" Schulze
- Relations: Carlos "Charlie" O. Cojuangco (brother); Jaime D. Cojuangco (nephew)
- Children: 3
- Parent: Danding Cojuangco (father)
- Profession: Politician

Marcos Juan Bruno Oppen Cojuangco (born October 6, 1957), also known as Mark Cojuangco, is a Filipino politician and businessman. He currently serving as representative of the 2nd District of Pangasinan since 2022. He previously served as representative of the 5th District of Pangasinan from 2001 to 2010, he also served as the vice-chairman of Committee on Appropriations.

== House Bill 04631 and English Wikipedia citations ==
Cojuangco is the author of the controversial House Bill 04631 that mandates the immediate re-commissioning and commercial operation of the Bataan Nuclear Power Plant, appropriating funds therefor, and for other purposes. His presentation of the bill at the Congressional hearing on February 2, 2009 came under scrutiny from the opposition for citing English Wikipedia articles about nuclear plants in other countries and quotes from non-experts to argue for the re-commissioning of the Bataan Nuclear Power Plant.

== Personal life ==
Cojuangco is the eldest son of Eduardo Cojuangco, Jr. and Soledad "Gretchen" Oppen.

He is married to Ma. Carmen "Kimi" Shulze. The couple have three children: Danielle, Paola and Eduardo III.

== Political career ==
From 2001 to 2010, Cojuangco served as the Representative of the 5th District of Pangasinan.

He ran as Governor of Pangasinan in 2016, as he supported the candidacy of Vice President Jejomar Binay and Sen. Bongbong Marcos as President and Vice President respectively.

He changed his residency from Sison to Lingayen and, in 2022, he returned to Congress by defeating incumbent representative Jumel Anthony Espino in the 2nd District of Pangasinan.

House of Representatives of the Philippines
Preceded by Jumel Anthony Espino	Member of the House of Representatives from Pangasinan's 2nd district 2022–present	Incumbent
Preceded by Amadeo Perez Jr.	Member of the House of Representatives from Pangasinan's 5th district 2001–2010	Succeeded by Carmen Schulze Cojuangco
