= N114 highway =

Secondary national road in the Philippines

Route 114

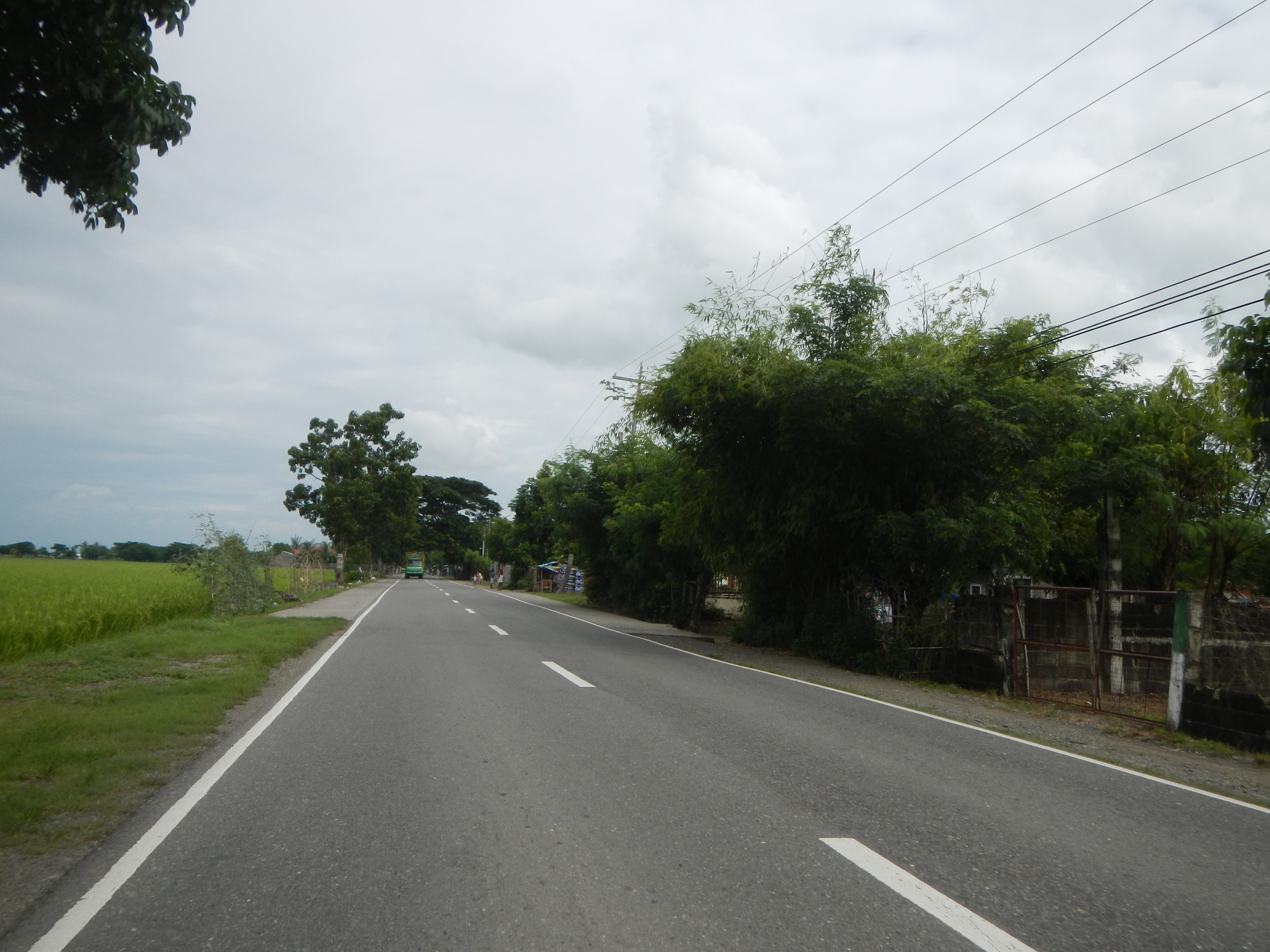
- The highway at San Rosario, Santo Domingo, Nueva Ecija

Route information
- Maintained by Department of Public Works and Highways
- Length: 162.54 km (101.00 mi)

Major junctions
- From: AH26 (Pan-Philippine Highway) in Santa Fe
- N56 (Umingan–Carmen Road) in Rosales; AH26 (Pan-Philippine Highway) in Santo Domingo; N111 (Nueva Ecija–Aurora Road) in Palayan City
- To: Unnamed Street in Dingalan

Location
- Country: Philippines
- Provinces: Aurora, Pangasinan, Nueva Ecija and Nueva Vizcaya
- Major cities: Palayan City
- Towns: Santa Fe, San Nicolas, Tayug, Santa Maria, Rosales, Cuyapo, Guimba, Santo Domingo, Laur, Gabaldon, Dingalan

Highway system
- Roads in the Philippines; Highways; Expressways; List
← N113	→ N115

National Route 114 (N114) of the Philippine highway network, is a 162.54-kilometer (101.00 mi) national secondary road in the provinces of Aurora, Nueva Ecija, Pangasinan, and Nueva Vizcaya. It traverses and connects the municipality of Dingalan in the province of Aurora, the city of Palayan, the municipalities of Laur, Gabaldon, Santo Domingo, Guimba, and Cuyapo in the province of Nueva Ecija, Rosales, Santa Maria, Tayug, and San Nicolas in the province of Pangasinan, and Santa Fe in the province of Nueva Vizcaya. It consist of three parts namely, Palayan–Gabaldon–Dingalan Road, Nueva Ecija–Pangasinan Road (Note: In the Pangasinan part of the highway, it is locally known as the "Pangasinan–Nueva Ecija Road") and Pangasinan–Nueva Vizcaya Road. (Note: In the Nueva Vizcaya part of the highway, it is locally known as the "Nueva Vizcaya–Pangasinan Road")

Villa Verde Trail is part of this highway, famous for being a major battleground during the Second World War.

== History ==
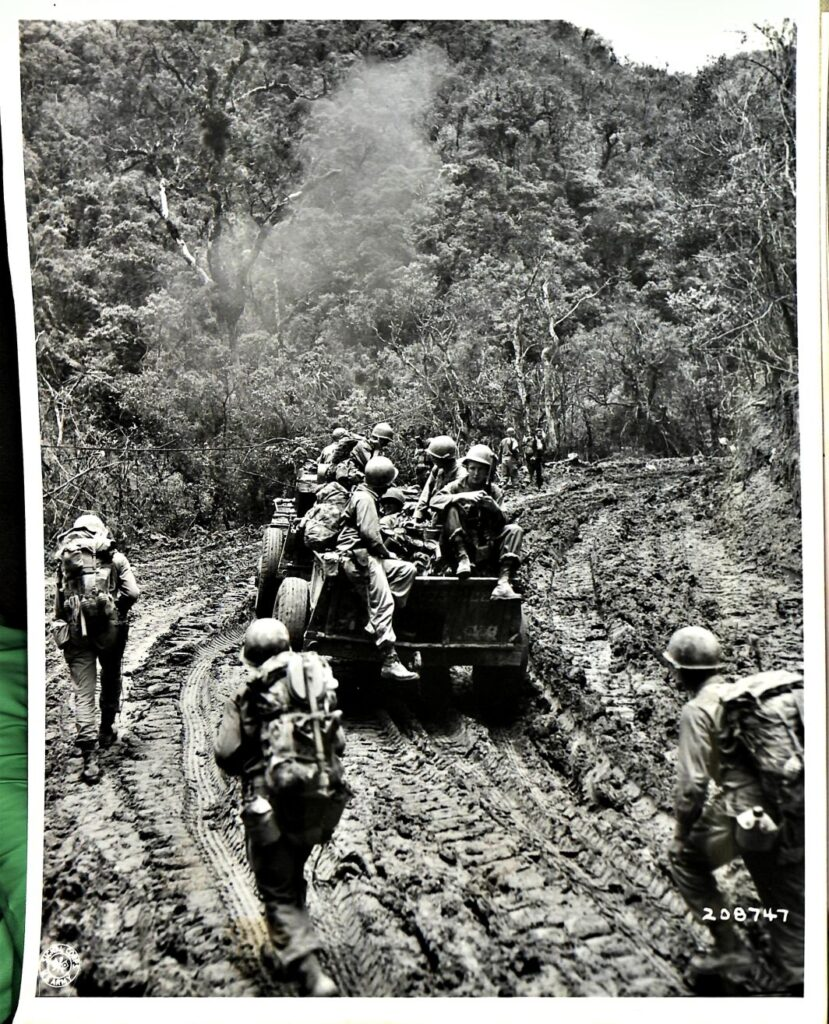
Image of the Battle in Villa Verde Trail

Villa Verde Trail, a part of this highway located at Barangay Malico, San Nicolas, Pangasinan (Note: There is a current boundary dispute between Santa Fe, Nueva Vizcaya and San Nicolas, Pangasinan over Barangay Malico.) become a battleground during the Second World War. An intense battle between the Japanese Imperial Forces under the command of Lt. General Tomoyuki Yamashita and the US Army 32nd Infantry Division's 127th Infantry Regiment under the command of Maj. Gen William H. Gill from January 30, 1945, to May 28, 1945.

Villa Verde Trail, a section of the Pangasinan–Nueva Vizcaya Road was finally completed and open to the public on 2016 finally linking Pangasinan and Nueva Vizcaya section of the highway.

== Route description ==
The road serves as major road connecting the city of Palayan and the towns of Laur, Gabaldon, Dingalan in the province of Aurora as well as the towns of Santo Domingo, Guimba, Cuyapo and Rosales and vice versa. It also connects the town of Rosales, Santa Maria, Tayug, San Nicolas and Santa Fe and vice versa. It also acts as a shortcut to access Tarlac–Pangasinan–La Union Expressway (TPLEX) at Carmen, Rosales from both the provinces of Nueva Ecija and Nueva Vizcaya.

=== Palayan–Gabaldon–Dingalan Road ===
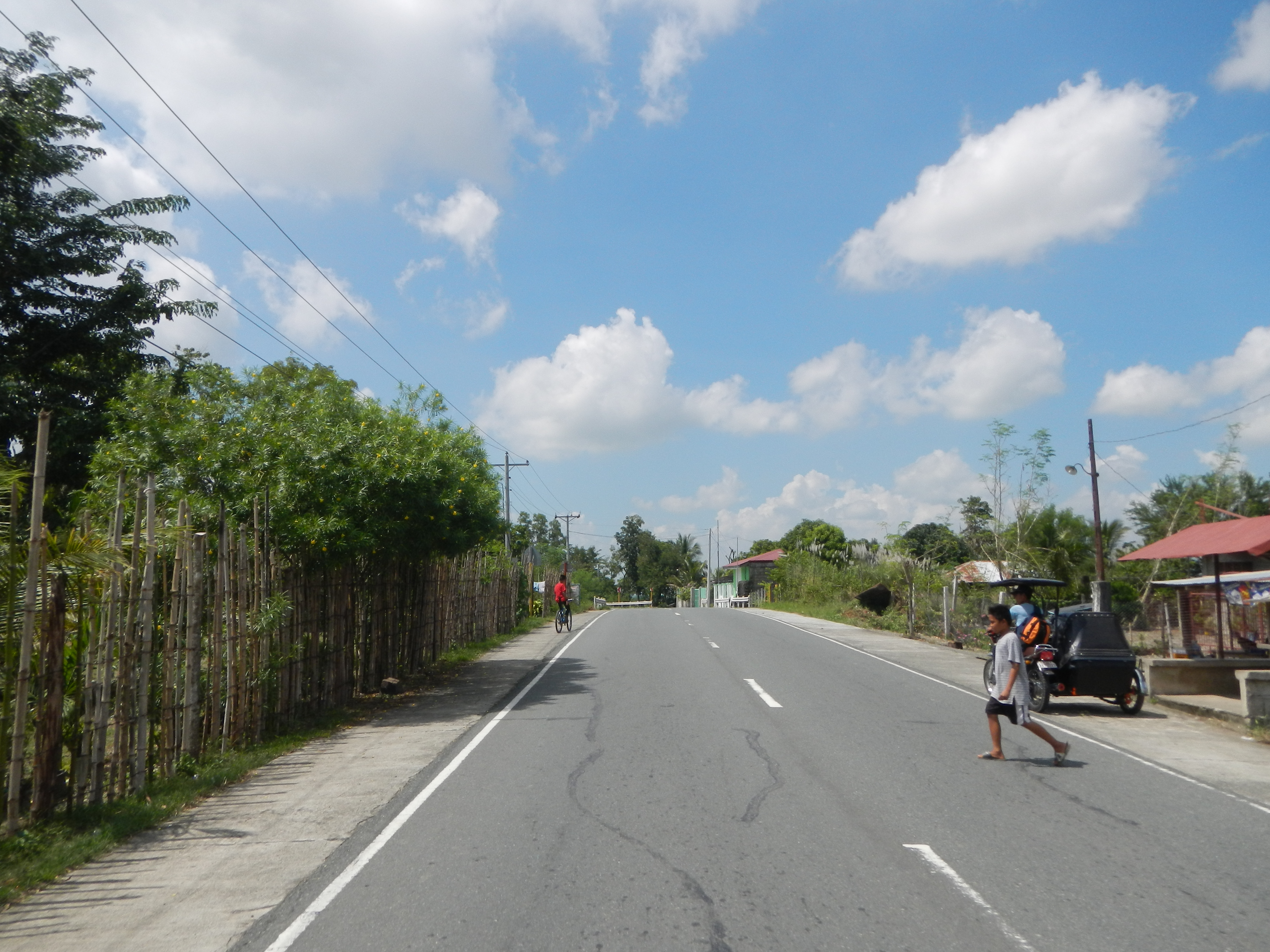
The highway at Laur, Nueva Ecija

The highway starts at the town proper of Dingalan, Aurora, continue, northwest to the province of Nueva Ecija near the Aurora Memorial National Park into town of Gabaldon and continue eastward into the town of Laur and finally reaching the junction with Nueva Ecija–Aurora Road (N111) at Palayan City. It is then cut off by the N111 and N1 for approximately 41-kilometer (25 mi).

=== Nueva Ecija–Pangasinan Road ===
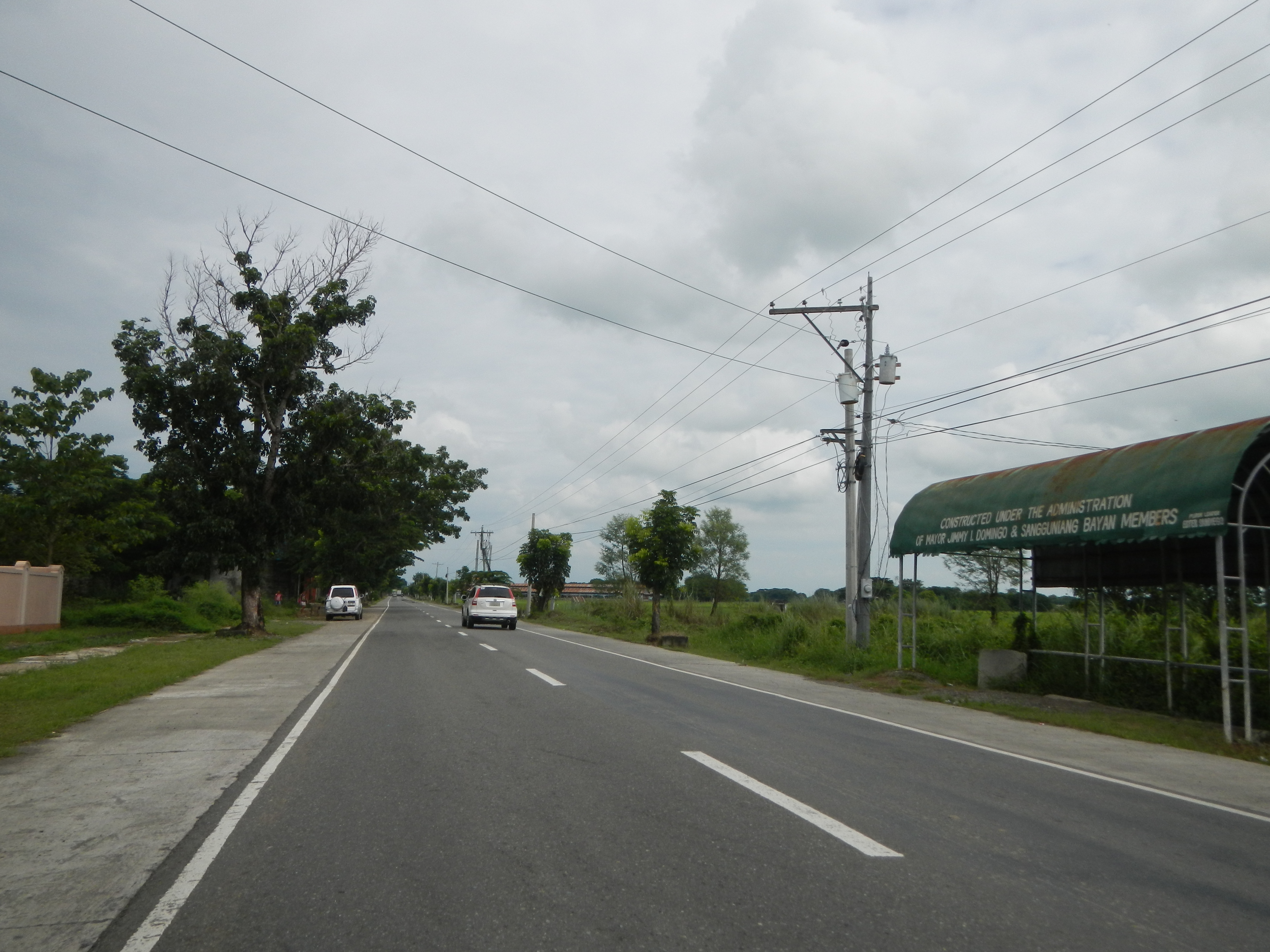
The highway at Santo Domingo, Nueva Ecija

The highway continues at Barangay Baloc, Santo Domingo at the junction with Pan-Philippine Highway. and traverses through the town of Guimba and Cuyapo and continue to the province of Pangasinan. In Rosales, Pangasinan in reaches the junction with Umingan–Carmen Road (N56) and get cut off again for 6.76-kilometer (4.20 mi).

=== Pangasinan–Nueva Vizcaya Road ===
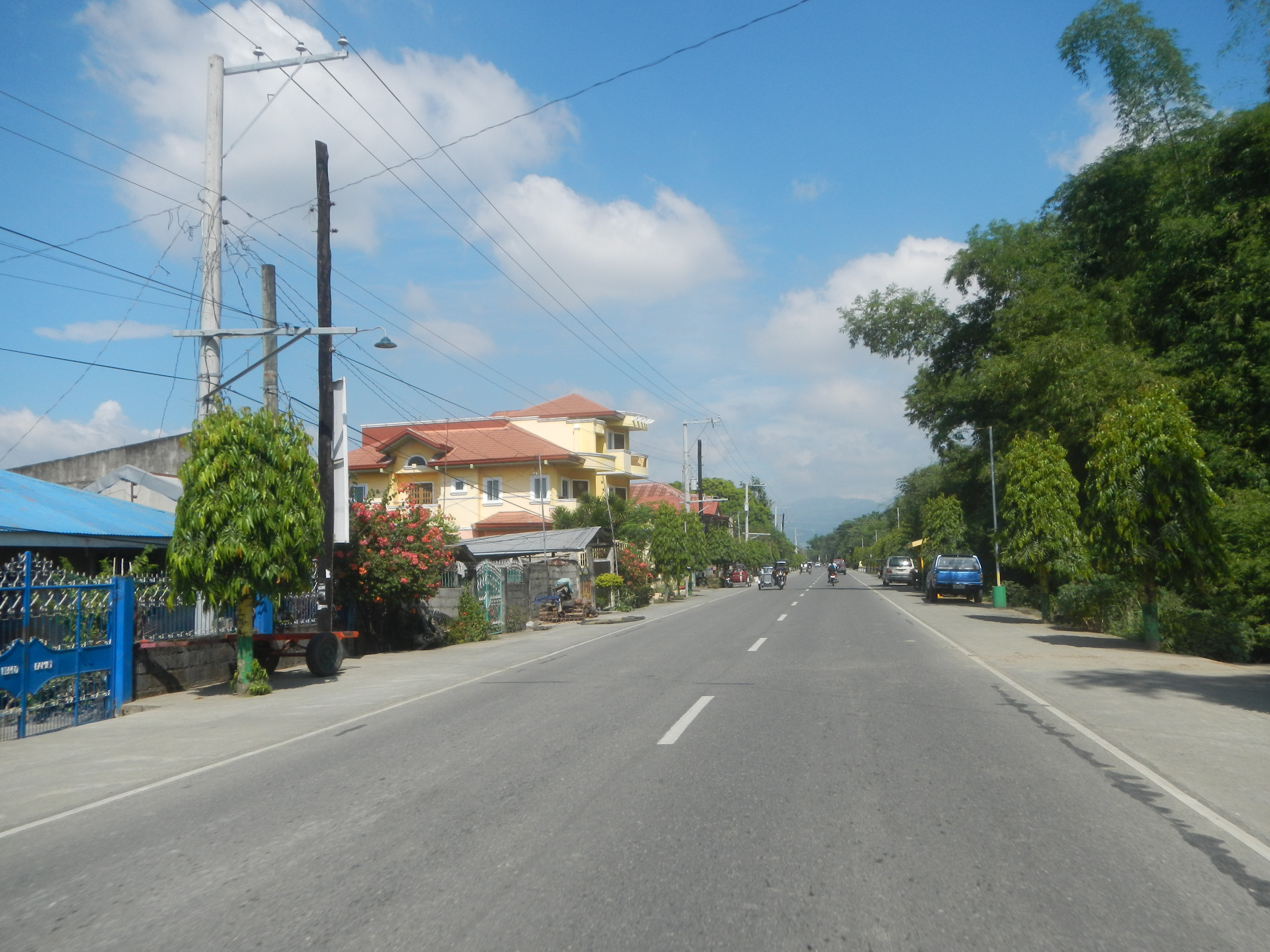
The highway at San Nicolas, Pangasinan

The highway continues at the junction with Umingan–Carmen Road (N56) at the town proper of Rosales, Pangasinan. It continue northward to the towns of Santa Maria, Tayug and continue at San Nicolas, Pangasinan. After the reaching the town proper of San Nicolas, it continues upland with into Caraballo Mountains where it locally known as Villa Verde Trail or Malico Road. The road in this part of the highway consists of steep and curvy roads. It reaches Salacsac Pass located at the top of Barangay Malico. It then descends into the boundary with Nueva Vizcaya and finally reach the junction with Pan-Philippine Highway in Santa Fe, Nueva Vizcaya.

== Intersections ==
Intersections are numbered by kilometer posts, with Rizal Park in Manila designated as kilometer zero.

=== Palayan–Gabaldon–Dingalan Road ===
Province	City/Municipality	km	mi	Destinations	Notes
Nueva Ecija	Palayan			N111 (Nueva Ecija–Aurora Road) / Gen. Mamerto Natividad–Palayan City Road – Bongabon, General Mamerto Natividad, Cabanatuan	Northern terminus of section. Northbound to Bongabon; southbound to Cabanatuan; Westbound to Gen. Mamerto Natividad.
Nueva Ecija	Palayan			Imelda Valley–Sapang Buho Road	
Nueva Ecija	Laur			Laur–Fort Magsaysay Road – Santa Rosa, Cabanatuan	
Nueva Ecija	Laur			Bongabon–Dingalan Road	
Nueva Ecija	Gabaldon			Guiho Street / Narra Street	Southbound to Brgy. Camachile & Bantug.
Aurora	Dingalan			General Nakar–Dingalan Road/Dingalan Port Road – General Nakar	Southern terminus of section. Access to Dingalan Port.
1.000 mi = 1.609 km; 1.000 km = 0.621 mi

=== Nueva Ecija–Pangasinan Road ===
Province	City/Municipality	km	mi	Destinations	Notes
Nueva Ecija	Santo Domingo			AH26 (Maharlika Highway) / Baloc–Sagaba Road – Santo Domingo, San Jose, Cabanatuan	Southern terminus of segment. Northbound to San Jose City; southbound to Santo Domingo town proper; Southeast-ward to Cabanatuan.
Nueva Ecija	Guimba			Victoria–Guimba Road – Victoria, Quezon, Licab	Guimba town proper.
Nueva Ecija	Guimba			Guimba–Talugtug Road / Afan Salvador Street – Talugtug, Umingan	Northbound to Talugtug and Umingan.
Nueva Ecija	Guimba			Guimba Bypass Road	Bypasses Guimba town proper.
Nueva Ecija	Guimba			Pura–Guimba Road – Pura, Gerona	
Nueva Ecija	Cuyapo			Quezon Avenue – Anao, Nampicuan, Moncada	Access to Cuyapo town proper.
Nueva Ecija	Cuyapo			Cuyapo–Talugtug Road – Talugtug	
Pangasinan	Rosales			Mount Balungao Road – Balungao	Also provides access to Balungao town proper.
Pangasinan	Rosales			Carmen East-West Diversion Road – Urdaneta, Villasis, Pozorrubio	Connects to N2 (Manila North Road) and E1 (TPLEX Rosales Exit).
Pangasinan	Rosales			N56 (Rosales–Umingan Road) – Umingan, Santo Tomas, Villasis	Northern terminus of segment at Brgy. Balincanaway. Eastbound to Umingan. Westbound connects to N2 (Manila North Road).
1.000 mi = 1.609 km; 1.000 km = 0.621 mi

=== Pangasinan–Nueva Vizcaya Road ===
Province	City/Municipality	km	mi	Destinations	Notes
Pangasinan	Rosales			N56 (Rosales–Umingan Road) / Zamora Street – Umingan, Santo Tomas, Villasis	Southern terminus of segment at Rosales town proper. Eastbound to Umingan. Westbound connects to N1 (Manila North Road).
Pangasinan	Santa Maria			Santa Maria Bypass Road	Bypasses Santa Maria town proper. South end of bypass road.
Pangasinan	Santa Maria			Bantog–Dalayap–San Pablo Road	
Pangasinan	Santa Maria			Santa Maria–San Quintin Road – Asingan, San Quintin, Binalonan	Santa Maria town proper. Northwest to Asingan and Binalonan; southeast to San Quintin.
Pangasinan	Santa Maria			Santa Maria Bypass Road	North end of bypass road.
Pangasinan	Tayug			Evangelista–Santo Domingo–Lawak Road	
Pangasinan	Tayug			Old Libertad Dike Road	
Pangasinan	Tayug			Old Magallanes–Trenchera–Libertad Dike Road	
Pangasinan	Tayug			San Quintin–Tayug Road – San Quintin	
Pangasinan	Tayug			Tayug–Natividad Road – Natividad	
Pangasinan	San Nicolas			San Nicolas–Natividad Road – Natividad, San Quintin	
Nueva Vizcaya	Santa Fe			AH26 (Maharlika Highway) – Aritao, Bayombong, Bambang	Northern terminus of segment. Northbound to Cagayan and Isabela; southbound to Manila via Dalton Pass.
1.000 mi = 1.609 km; 1.000 km = 0.621 mi
