= N56 highway (Philippines) =

Major road in Luzon, Philippines

National Route 56
- San Jose–Lupao Road; Umingan–Carmen Road
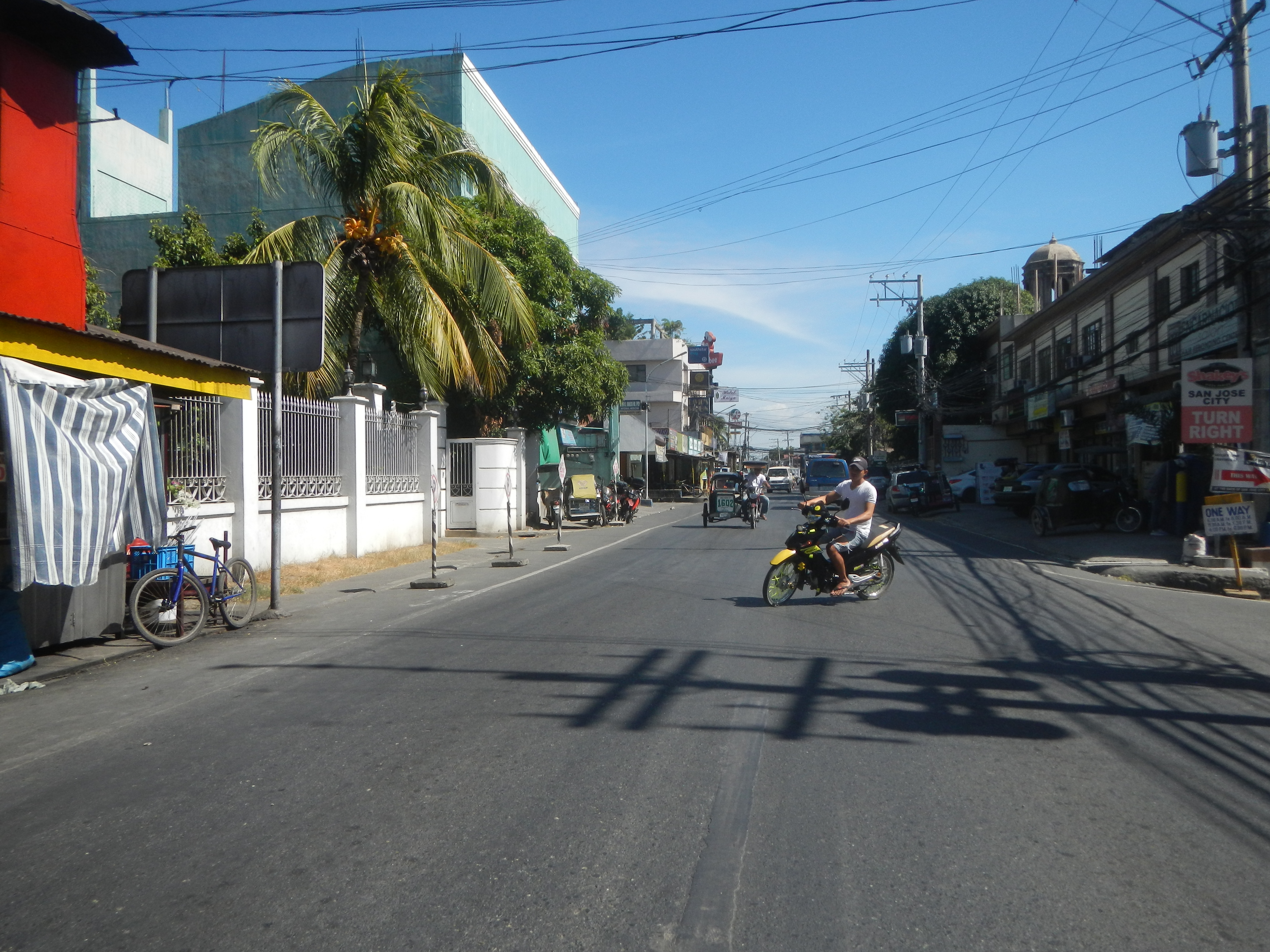
- San Jose-Lupao Road

Route information
- Maintained by Department of Public Works and Highways
- Length: 52.21 km (32.44 mi)

Major junctions
- East end: AH 26 (N1) (Pan-Philippine Highway) in San Jose City
- N114 (Pangasinan–Nueva Ecija Road) in Rosales; N114 (Pangasinan–Nueva Vizcaya Road) in Rosales
- West end: N2 (MacArthur Highway) in Carmen, Rosales

Location
- Country: Philippines
- Provinces: Pangasinan, Nueva Ecija
- Major cities: San Jose
- Towns: Lupao, Umingan, Balungao, Rosales

Highway system
- Roads in the Philippines; Highways; Expressways; List
← N55	→ N57

National Route 56 (N56) of the Philippine highway network, is a 52.21-kilometer (32.44 mi) major primary road in the provinces of Pangasinan and Nueva Ecija. It traverses and connects through the municipalities of Lupao, Umingan, Balungao, Rosales and the city of San Jose. It consists of two parts, namely, "San Jose–Lupao Road" and "Umingan–Carmen Road".

== Route description ==
The road serves as a major highway when going to the city of San Jose and the town of Lupao in Nueva Ecija and the towns of Umingan, Balungao and Rosales in province of Pangasinan and vice versa.

=== San Jose–Lupao Road ===
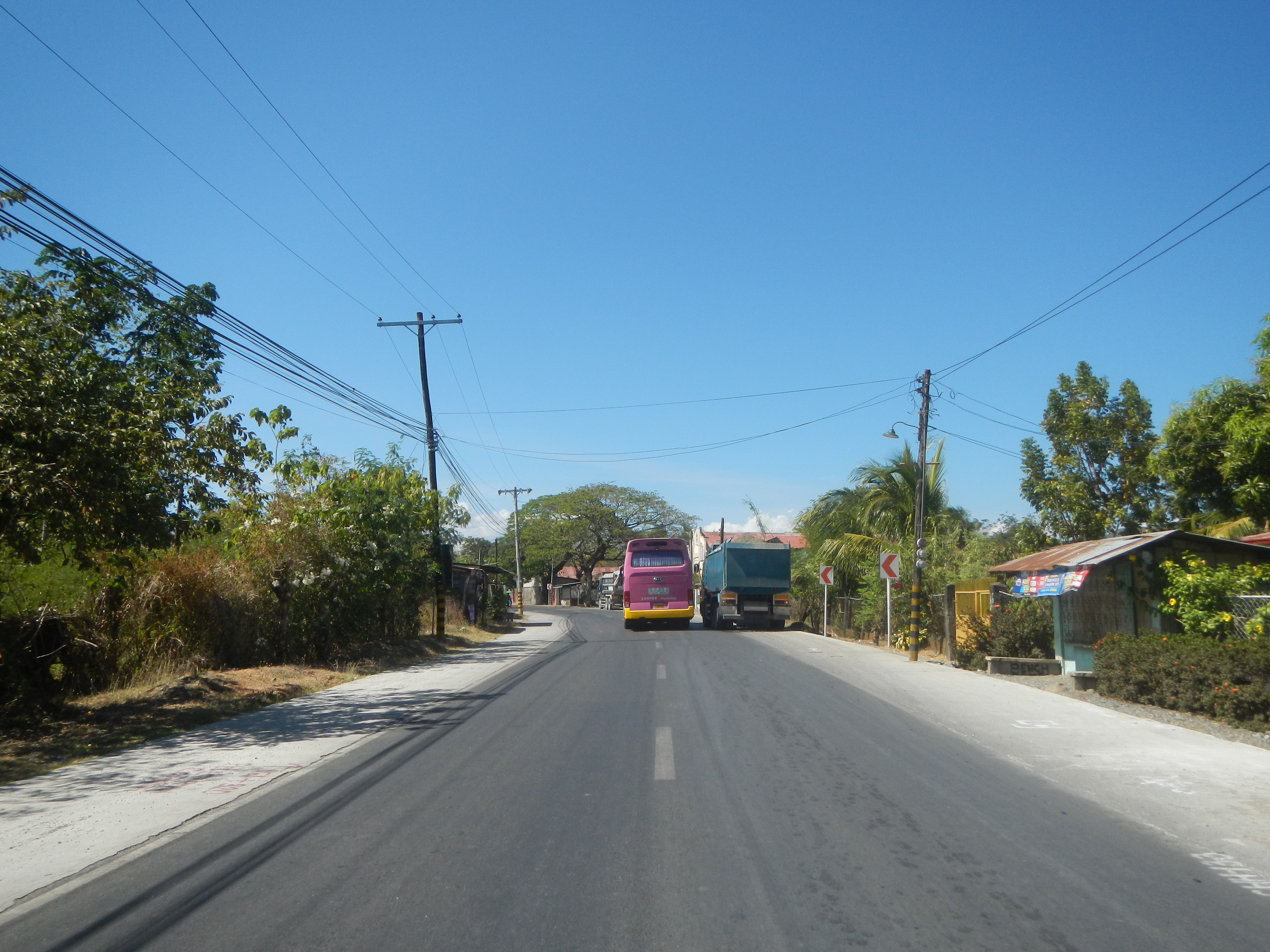
The highway at San Jose City, Nueva Ecija

The road starts at the intersection with Pan-Philippine Highway and Rizal–San Jose City Road at San Jose City. Then, it passes through the town of Lupao and crosses the boundary with the province of Pangasinan until it reaches the town proper of Umingan at the intersection with Umingan–San Quintin Road.

=== Umingan–Carmen Road ===
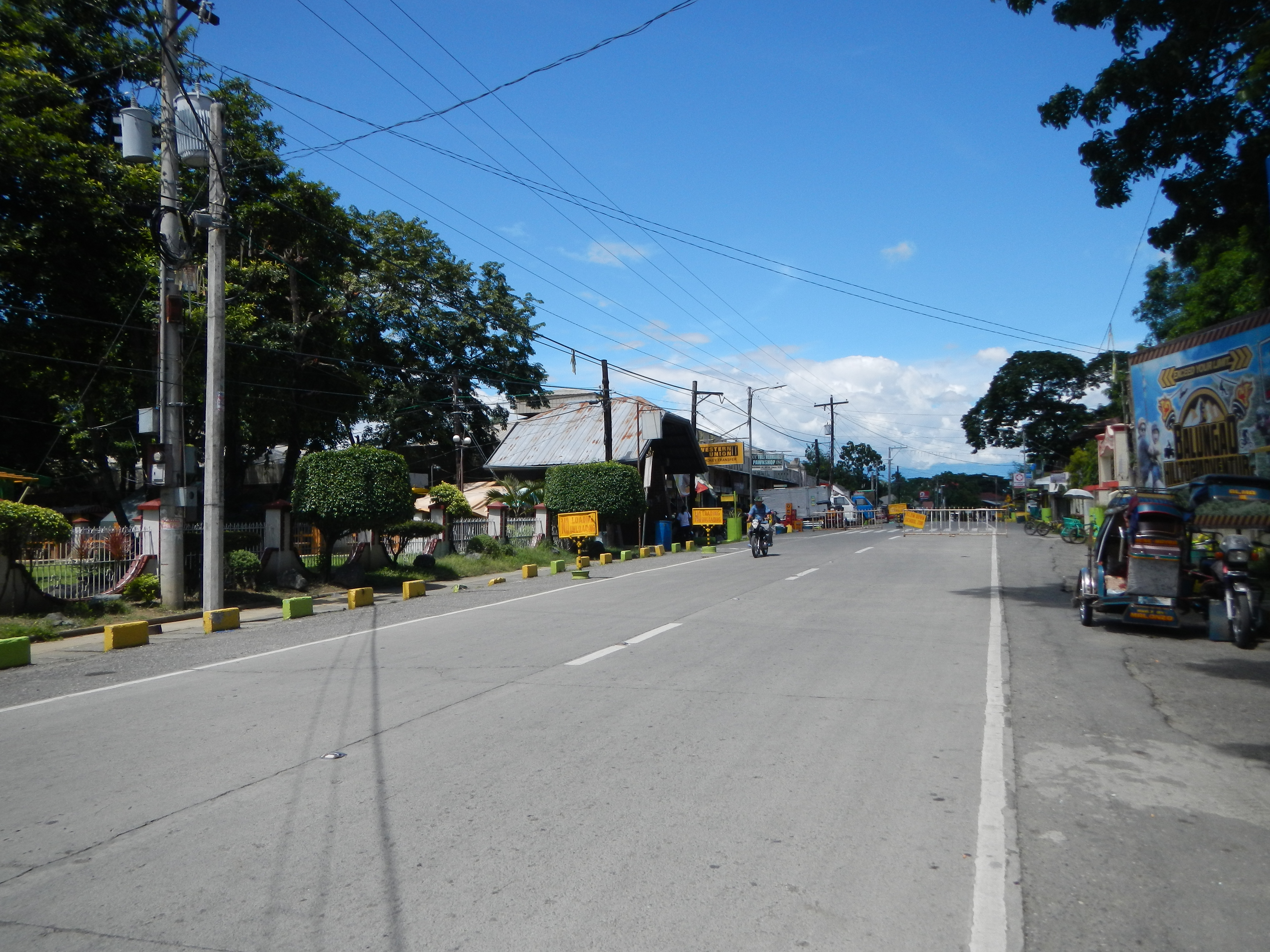
The highway at Balungao, Pangasinan

The road turn left and then turns westward again, it passes through the town of Balungao and into a junction with the Pangasinan–Nueva Ecija Road, through the town proper of Rosales into a junction with Pangasinan–Nueva Vizcaya Road and ends with the intersection with MacArthur Highway and Carmen–Alcala Road at Barangay Carmen, Rosales.
