= Conrado F. Estrella Regional Medical and Trauma Center =

Government hospital in Pangasinan, Philippines

Geography
- Location: Rosales, Pangasinan, Ilocos, Philippines
- Coordinates: 15.90707°N 120.62295°E

Organization
- Funding: Government hospital

The Conrado F. Estrella Regional Medical and Trauma Center is a government hospital in the Philippines. It is located in Rosales, Pangasinan.
