= Cuyapo =

Municipality in Nueva Ecija, Philippines

- Municipality
- Municipality of Cuyapo
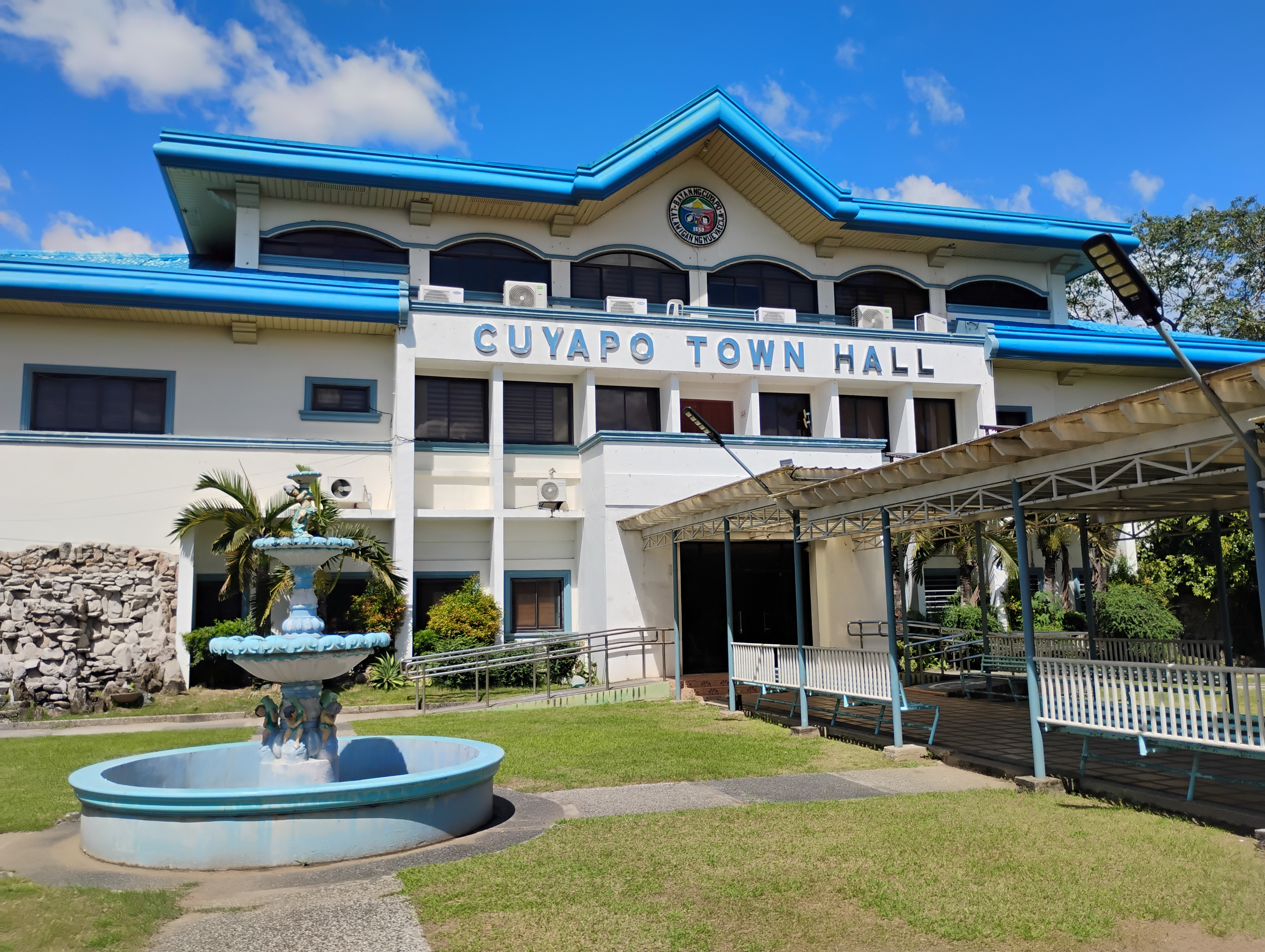
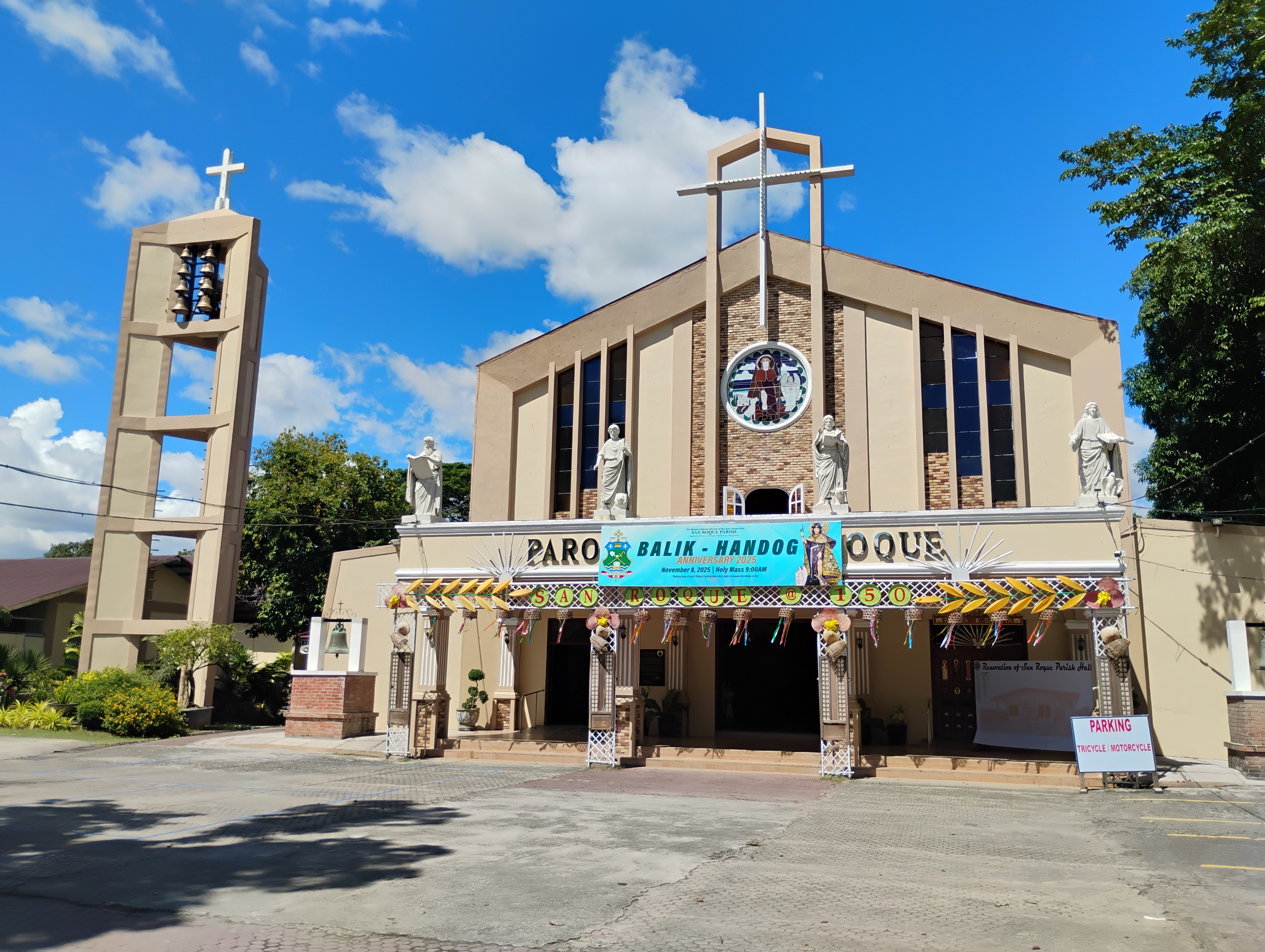
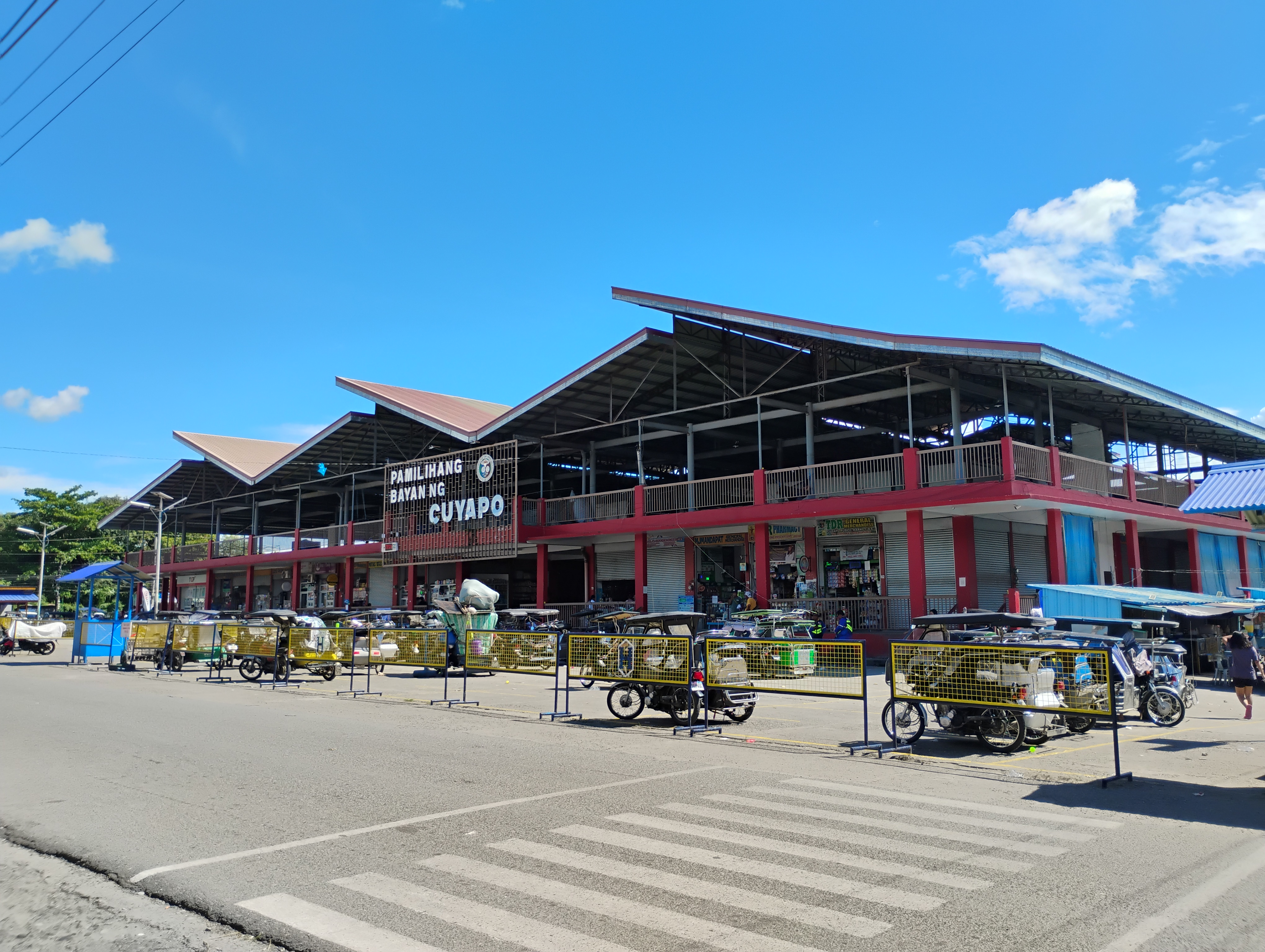
- Cuyapo Town Hall San Roque Parish Church Cuyapo Public Market

- Seal

- Map of Nueva Ecija with Cuyapo highlighted
- Interactive map of Cuyapo
- Location within the Philippines
- Coordinates: 15°46′40″N 120°39′39″E
- Country: Philippines
- Region: Central Luzon
- Province: Nueva Ecija
- District: 1st district
- Founded: 1859
- Barangays: 51 (see Barangays)

Government
  - Type: Sangguniang Bayan
  - Mayor: Jose S. Hidalgo Jr.
  - Vice Mayor: Florida Paguio-Esteban
  - Representative: Mikaela Angela B. Suansing
  - Municipal Council: Members: Amado U. Corpus III; Candy Mae C. Andres; Edwin G. Magaoay; Jennilyn M. Agustin; Jerry M. Marcos; John Paul A. Carbonel; Julius R. Gines; Kheyo R. Gines
  - Electorate: 44,533 voters (2025)

Area
  - Total: 215.73 km^{2} (83.29 sq mi)
- Elevation: 36 m (118 ft)
- Highest elevation: 243 m (797 ft)
- Lowest elevation: 18 m (59 ft)

Population (2024 census)
  - Total: 70,919
  - Density: 328.74/km^{2} (851.43/sq mi)
  - Households: 17,907
- Demonym: Cuyapeño (Cuyapenyo)

Economy
  - Income class: 1st municipal income class
  - Poverty incidence: 11.88% (2023)
  - Revenue: ₱ 314.4 million (2024)
  - Assets: ₱ 1,075 million (2024)
  - Expenditure: ₱ 292.1 million (2024)
  - Liabilities: ₱ 265.5 million (2024)

Service provider
  - Electricity: Tarlac 1 Electric Cooperative (TARELCO 1)
- Time zone: UTC+8 (PST)
- ZIP code: 3117
- PSGC: 0304906000
- IDD : area code: +63 (0)44
- Native languages: Ilocano; Tagalog
- Website: www.cuyapo.gov.ph

Cuyapo [ˌkujaˈpɔ(ʔ)], officially the Municipality of Cuyapo (Ilocano: Ili ti Cuyapo; Pangasinan: Baley na Cuyapo; Tagalog: Bayan ng Cuyapo), is a municipality in the province of Nueva Ecija, Philippines. According to the 2024 census, it has a population of 70,919 people.

Cuyapo is 53 kilometres (33 mi) from Cabanatuan, 67 kilometres (42 mi) from Palayan, and 169 kilometres (105 mi) from Manila.

== Etymology ==
Cuyapo is named after the water cabbage (Pistia stratiotes) which is known in Pangasinense as kuyapo. The district of Quiapo, Manila is also named after the same plant, this is the Tagalog counterpart, modern spelling kiyapo.

== History ==
=== Early beginnings ===
Pangasinenses from Paniqui, Tarlac who used to pasture their cattle, other Pangasinenses from Calasiao and San Carlos, Pangasinan, Ilocano foresters from Santa Maria and Narvacan, Ilocos Sur; Paoay and Batac in Ilocos Norte; and some Tagalogs from Bulacan and southern Nueva Ecija settled in great number in the town. It is said that the exodus, particularly from Ilocos Sur, was due to the forced labor enforced by the Spaniards in the construction of the church in Santa Maria. Cuyapo was declared a Barrio of Rosales (now a municipality of Pangasinan) on September 25, 1849, with Senor Santiago Vergara as its first Teniente del Barrio. It was in 1901 under the American civil administration that Rosales, together with Balungao, Umingan, San Quintin, were segregated from Nueva Ecija and became parts of Pangasinan.

=== Founding ===
On October 29, 1859, Cuyapo was separated from Rosales and made a full-fledged town with Don Juan Pangalilingan as the first Gobernadorcillo. It was during his term that the first Catholic Church and convent was constructed. The old road to Guimba, passing through what is now Barangay Maycaban was constructed.

=== Revolutionary period ===
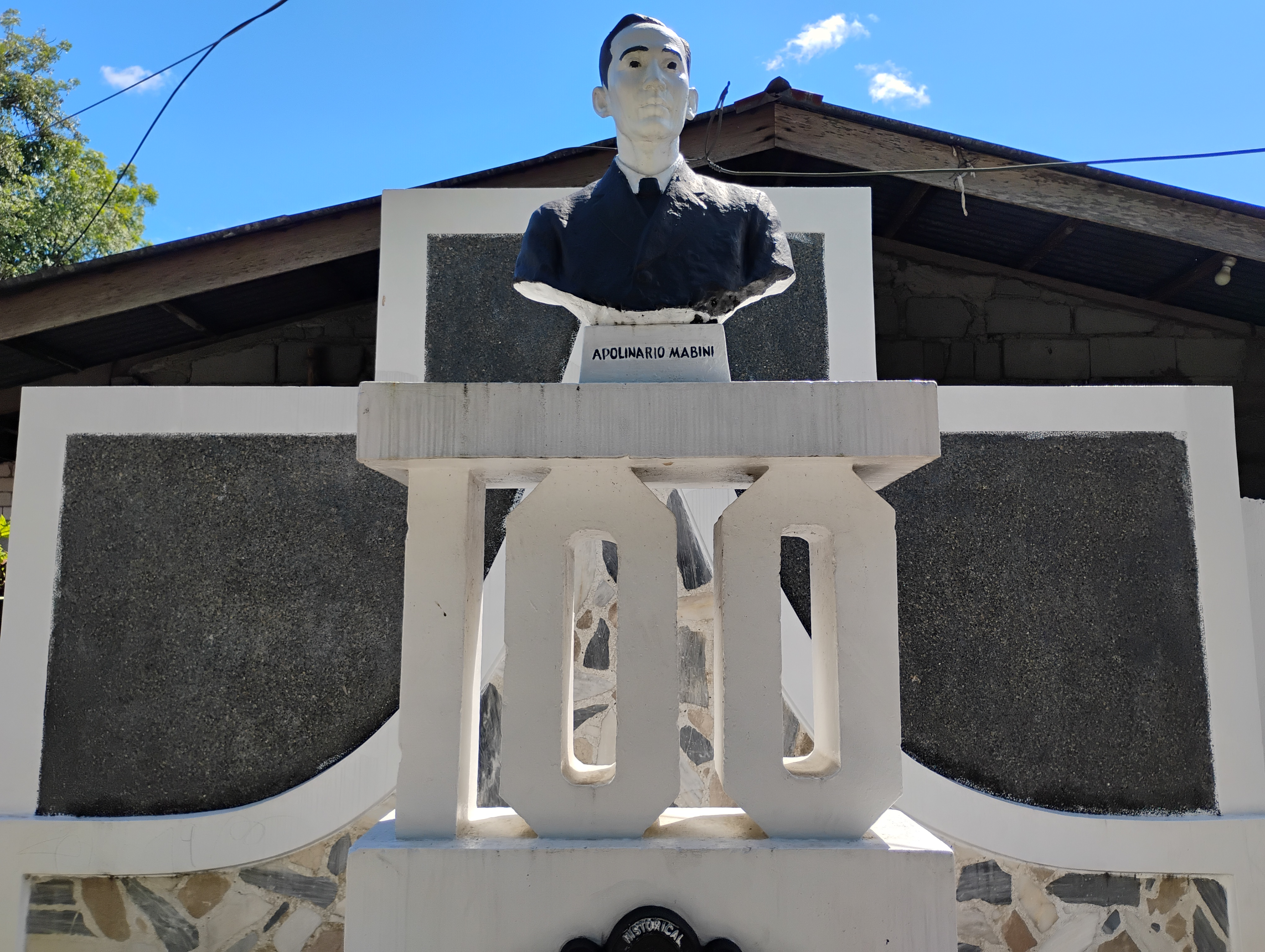
Apolinario Mabini Monument

On June 19, 1898, two to three hundred Cuyapenos, under Lieutenant Isabelo del Valle of Paniqui, Tarlac, answered the call of duty and ambushed a heavily armed contingent of Spanish Cazadores who came from Rosales en route to Tarlac in Bessang (now part of Barangay Maycaban. The Cuyapenos then had only 15 Remington rifles and the rest armed with bolos. On July 1, Gen. Mariano Llanera, then Military Governor of Nueva Ecija, appointed Don Marcelo Garcia, last Capitan Municipal during the Spanish Regime, as Presidente Municipal with Don Mariano Flores, last Teniente Mayor, as Vise Presidente Municipal. Later, under the interim government, election of municipal officials was held. This revolutionary period of government existed until the American forces came in November of the same year.

== Geography ==
=== Barangays ===
Cuyapo is politically subdivided into 51 barangays. Each barangay consists of puroks and some have sitios.

- Baloy
- Bambanaba
- Bantug
- Bentigan
- Bibiclat
- Bonifacio
- Bued
- Bulala
- Burgos
- Cabileo
- Cabatuan
- Cacapasan
- Calancuasan Norte
- Calancuasan Sur
- Colosboa
- Columbitin
- Curva
- District I (Pob. I)
- District II (Pob. II)
- District IV (Pob. IV)
- District V (Pob. V)
- District VI (Pob. VI)
- District VII (Pob. VII)
- District VIII (Pob. VIII)
- Landig
- Latap
- Loob
- Luna
- Malbeg-Patalan
- Malineng
- Matindeg
- Maycaban
- Nagcuralan
- Nagmisahan
- Paitan Norte
- Paitan Sur
- Piglisan
- Pugo
- Rizal
- Sabit
- Salagusog
- San Antonio (Butao)
- San Jose
- San Juan
- Santa Clara
- Santa Cruz
- Simimbaan
- Tagtagumbao
- Tutuloy
- Ungab
- Villaflores

=== Climate ===
Climate data for Cuyapo, Nueva Ecija
Month	Jan	Feb	Mar	Apr	May	Jun	Jul	Aug	Sep	Oct	Nov	Dec	Year
Mean daily maximum °C (°F)	30 (86)	31 (88)	33 (91)	35 (95)	33 (91)	31 (88)	30 (86)	29 (84)	29 (84)	30 (86)	31 (88)	30 (86)	31 (88)
Mean daily minimum °C (°F)	19 (66)	19 (66)	20 (68)	22 (72)	24 (75)	24 (75)	24 (75)	24 (75)	23 (73)	22 (72)	21 (70)	20 (68)	22 (71)
Average precipitation mm (inches)	3 (0.1)	2 (0.1)	5 (0.2)	10 (0.4)	80 (3.1)	107 (4.2)	138 (5.4)	147 (5.8)	119 (4.7)	70 (2.8)	26 (1.0)	8 (0.3)	715 (28.1)
Average rainy days	2.0	1.7	2.7	4.6	16.1	20.8	24.0	23.0	21.4	15.5	8.0	3.2	143
Source: Meteoblue (modeled/calculated data, not measured locally)

== Demographics ==
Population census of Cuyapo

Year	Pop.	±% p.a.
1903	16,292	—
1918	19,344	+1.15%
1939	24,570	+1.15%
1948	28,923	+1.83%
1960	30,634	+0.48%
1970	34,793	+1.28%
1975	39,109	+2.37%
1980	39,654	+0.28%

Year	Pop.	±% p.a.
1990	43,103	+0.84%
1995	49,791	+2.74%
2000	51,366	+0.67%
2007	55,456	+1.06%
2010	59,396	+2.53%
2015	65,039	+1.74%
2020	68,066	+0.96%
2024	70,919	+0.99%

Source: Philippine Statistics Authority

== Economy ==
Poverty incidence of Cuyapo (%)

Source: Philippine Statistics Authority

== Tourism ==
- Apolinario Mabini Marker (Cuyapo) - Site of the arrest of Philippine hero Apolinario Mabini, known as “the sublime paralytic,” by the Americans on December 10, 1899.
- Armando's Garden Resort and Villas
- Colosboa Hills - Tagged as the “New Zealand of Cuyapo” the “Colosboa Hills” is a vast green mountain range perfect for camping, photoshoots, and a biking destination. located at Barangay Colosboa in the Municipality of Cuyapo. Colosboa Hills, Cuyapo, Nueva Ecija.
- Mount Bulaylay Zipline - located at Brgy. Landig, Cuyapo, Nueva Ecija. Mt. Bulaylay and Mt. Bangkay. These towering mounds of rock and soil hold another new adventure destination in Nueva Ecija. Mt. Bulaylay, towering at 286 meters above sea level, is a multi-peak mountain with zipline equipment that can whisk a tandem ride
- Paitan Lake - located at Paitan Sur, Cuyapo, Nueva Ecija. A serene lake that holds a mystical past poise as a next tourist destination too – that is Paitang Lake discovered by Don Cornelio Sumangil in 1885. Roughly about 15-18 kilometers from Cuyapo's town proper.

== Education ==
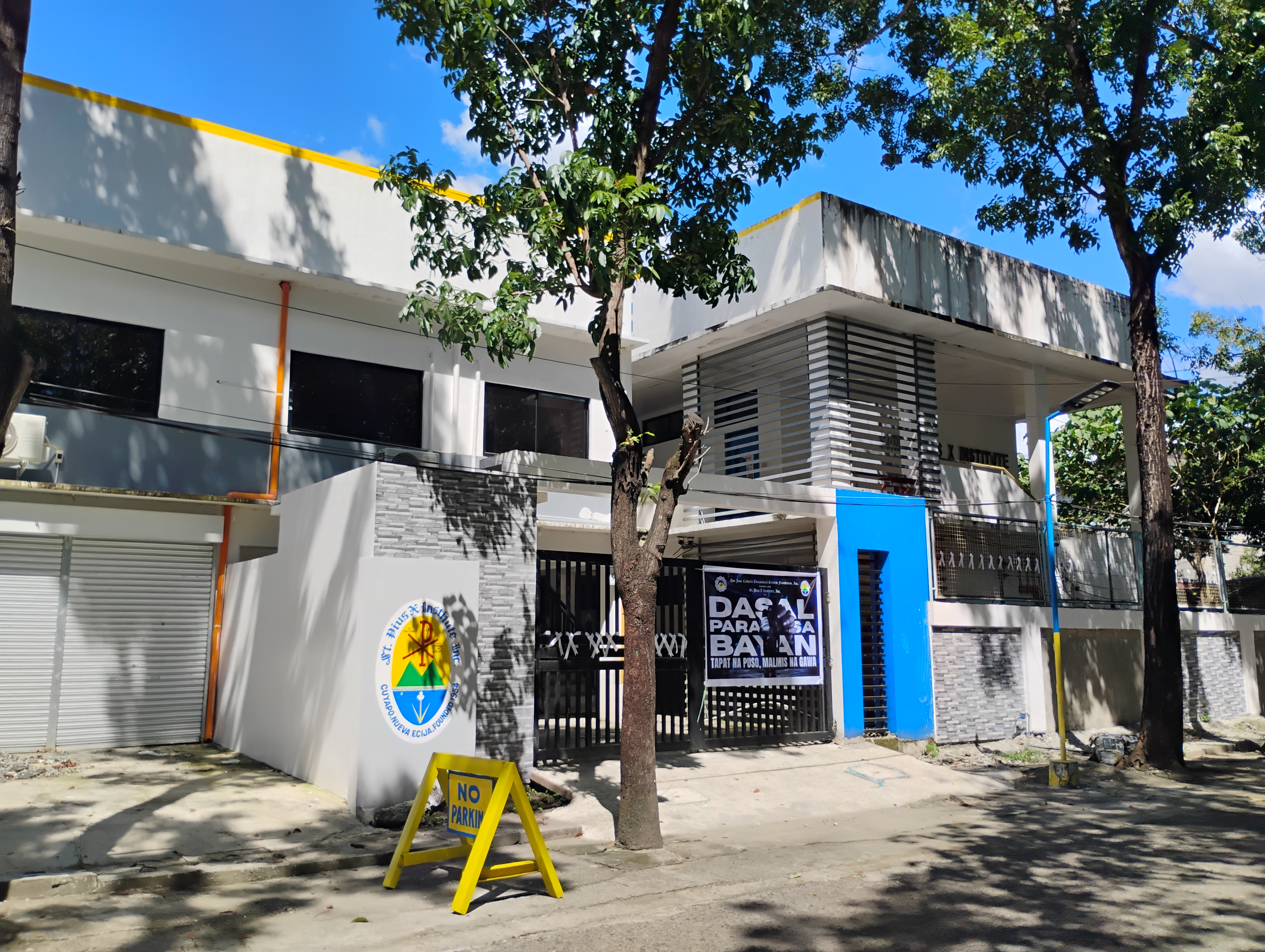
St. Pius X Institute Inc.

The Cuyapo Schools District Office governs all educational institutions within the municipality. It oversees the management and operations of all private and public, from primary to secondary schools.

=== Primary and elementary schools ===
- Baloy Elementary School
- Bambanaba Elementary School
- Bentigan Elementary School
- Bibiclat Elementary School
- Bonifacio Elementary School
- Brilliant Achievers School of Excellence
- Bued Primary School
- Burgos Elementary School
- Cabileo Elementary School
- Cabatuan Elementary School
- Calancuasan Norte Elementary School
- Calancuasan Sur Elementary School
- C.B. Tejero Elementary School
- Columbitin Elementary School
- Curva Elementary School
- Cuyapo Central School
- Cuyapo United Methodist Church Learning Center
- Doña Consuelo Elementary School
- D.M. Jose Elementary School
- D.R. Jose Elementary School
- E. Abalos Primary School
- Loob Elementary School
- Luna Elementary School
- Malbeg-Patalan Primary School
- Malineng Elementary School
- Matindeg Elementary School
- Nagcuralan Elementary School
- Nagmisahan Elementary School
- Ongsiako Elementary School
- Open Door Christian Academy
- Paitan Norte Elementary School
- Paitan Sur Elementary School
- Piglisan Elementary School
- Rizal Elementary School
- Sabit Elementary School
- Salagusog Elementary School
- San Antonio Elementary School
- San Jose Elementary School
- Simimbaan elementary school
- Santa Clara Elementary School
- Santa Cruz Primary School
- St. Lawrence Montessori
- St. Pius X Institute
- Tagtagumbao Elementary School
- Villaflores Elementary School

=== Secondary schools ===
- Baloy High School
- Bayag High School
- Bued-Luna High School
- Calancuasan National High School
- Cuyapo National High School
- Dr. Ramon De Santos National High School
- Paitan Sur National High School
- Salagusog National High School
- Simimbaan High School
- St. Pius X Institute
- Villaflores Integrated School
