= Umingan =

Municipality in Pangasinan, Philippines

- Municipality
- Municipality of Umingan
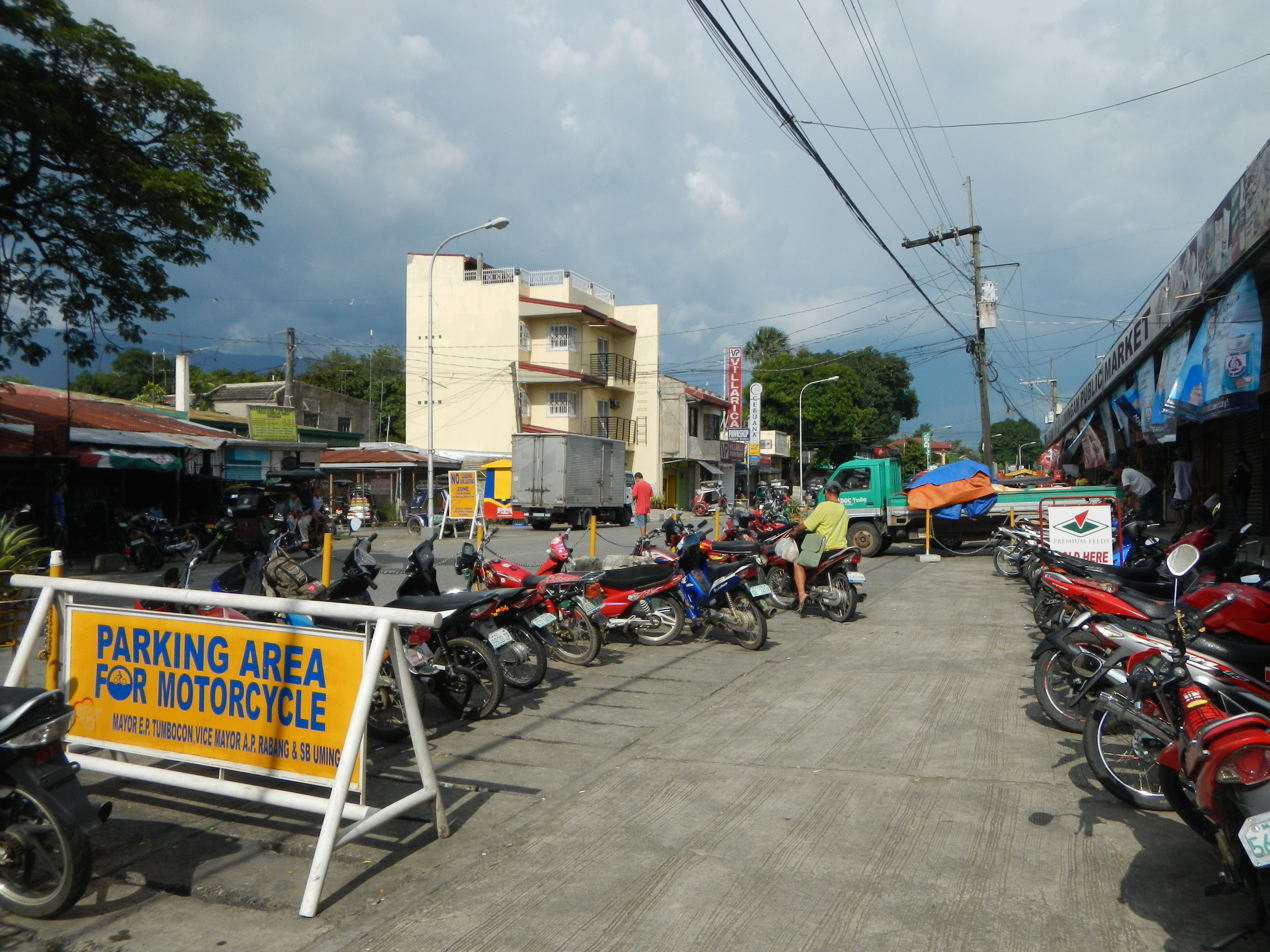
- Downtown area

- Seal

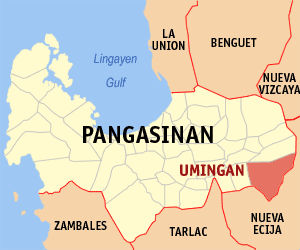
- Map of Pangasinan with Umingan highlighted
- Interactive map of Umingan
- Location within the Philippines
- Coordinates: 15°55′44″N 120°50′31″E
- Country: Philippines
- Region: Ilocos Region
- Province: Pangasinan
- District: 6th district
- Founded: May 5, 1843
- Barangays: 58 (see Barangays)

Government
  - Type: Sangguniang Bayan
  - Mayor: Michael M. Cruz (NP)
  - Vice Mayor: Chris Evert B.Tadeo-Leynes (API)
  - Representative: Marlyn L. Primicias-Agabas
  - Municipal Council: Members: Chris Evert T. Leynes; Pillar O. Onia; Cesario B. Galleguez; Siann Liandro M. Fernandez; Jonathan H. Navalta; Jay-ar O. Paz; Rosalina A. de Leon; Rosemarie C. Lucnagan
  - Electorate: 56,451 voters (2025)

Area
  - Total: 258.43 km^{2} (99.78 sq mi)
- Elevation: 115 m (377 ft)
- Highest elevation: 561 m (1,841 ft)
- Lowest elevation: 70 m (230 ft)

Population (2024 census)
  - Total: 78,940
  - Density: 305.5/km^{2} (791.1/sq mi)
  - Households: 20,380

Economy
  - Income class: 1st municipal income class
  - Poverty incidence: 12.53% (2015)
  - Revenue: ₱ 326.1 million (2024)
  - Assets: ₱ 558.1 million (2024)
  - Expenditure: ₱ 322.7 million (2024)
  - Liabilities: ₱ 153.4 million (2024)

Service provider
  - Electricity: Pangasinan 3 Electric Cooperative (PANELCO 3)
- Time zone: UTC+8 (PST)
- ZIP code: 2443
- PSGC: 0105544000
- IDD : area code: +63 (0)75
- Native languages: Pangasinan; Ilocano; Tagalog
- Website: www.umingan.gov.ph

Umingan, officially the Municipality of Umingan (Pangasinan: Baley na Umingan; Ilocano: Ili ti Umingan; Tagalog: Bayan ng Umingan), is a municipality in the province of Pangasinan, Philippines. According to the 2024 census, it has a population of 78,940 people.

== Geography ==
Umingan is situated 88.55 kilometres (55.02 mi) from the provincial capital Lingayen, and 197.21 kilometres (122.54 mi) from the country's capital city of Manila.

=== Barangays ===
Umingan is politically subdivided into 58 barangays. Each barangay consists of puroks and some have sitios.

- Abot Molina
- Alo-o
- Amaronan
- Annam (San Felipe)
- Bantug
- Baracbac
- Barat
- Buenavista
- Cabalitian
- Cabangaran
- Cabaruan
- Cabatuan
- Cádiz
- Calitlitan
- Capas
- Carayungan Sur
- Carosalesan
- Casilan
- Caurdanetaan
- Concepción
- Decreto
- Diaz
- Del Rosario (Treinta y Siete)
- Diket
- Don Justo Ábalos (Caroan)
- Don Montano (Cadamortisan)
- Esperanza
- Evangelista
- Flores
- Fulgosino
- Gonzales (Carayungan)
- La Paz
- Labuan
- Lauren
- Lubong
- Luna Weste
- Luna Este
- Mantacdang
- Maseil-seil
- Nampalcan
- Nancalabasaan
- Pangangaan
- Papallasen
- Pemienta
- Población East
- Población West
- Prado
- Resurrección
- Ricos
- San Andrés (Parang)
- San Juan
- San Leon
- San Pablo
- San Vicente
- Santa María
- Santa Rosa
- Sinabaan (Mondragon)
- Tanggal Sawang

=== Climate ===
Climate data for Umingan, Pangasinan
Month	Jan	Feb	Mar	Apr	May	Jun	Jul	Aug	Sep	Oct	Nov	Dec	Year
Mean daily maximum °C (°F)	31 (88)	31 (88)	32 (90)	34 (93)	35 (95)	34 (93)	32 (90)	32 (90)	32 (90)	32 (90)	32 (90)	31 (88)	32 (90)
Mean daily minimum °C (°F)	22 (72)	22 (72)	22 (72)	24 (75)	24 (75)	24 (75)	24 (75)	24 (75)	24 (75)	23 (73)	23 (73)	22 (72)	23 (74)
Average precipitation mm (inches)	13.6 (0.54)	10.4 (0.41)	18.2 (0.72)	15.7 (0.62)	178.4 (7.02)	227.9 (8.97)	368 (14.5)	306.6 (12.07)	310.6 (12.23)	215.7 (8.49)	70.3 (2.77)	31.1 (1.22)	1,766.5 (69.56)
Average rainy days	3	2	2	4	14	16	23	21	24	15	10	6	140
Source: World Weather Online

== Demographics ==
Population census of Umingan
Year	Pop.	±% p.a.
1903	5,761	—
1918	16,356	+7.20%
1939	24,960	+2.03%
1948	29,729	+1.96%
1960	30,664	+0.26%
1970	36,135	+1.65%
1975	40,880	+2.51%
1980	41,364	+0.24%
1990	48,003	+1.50%
1995	51,693	+1.40%
2000	58,603	+2.73%
2007	62,497	+0.89%
2010	67,534	+2.86%
2015	73,252	+1.56%
2020	77,074	+1.08%
2024	78,940	+0.58%
Source: Philippine Statistics Authority

97% of the residents of Umingan are descendants of Ilocano settlers from different areas of Ilocos Region, the remaining 3% are descendants of residents from central and coastal areas of Pangasinan, Tagalog settlers from Tagalog areas, most likely south Nueva Ecija and Bulacan, and Kapampangan settlers.

== Economy ==
Poverty incidence of Umingan (%)

Source: Philippine Statistics Authority

The town is a major producer of squash (kalabasa).

== Government ==
=== Local government ===
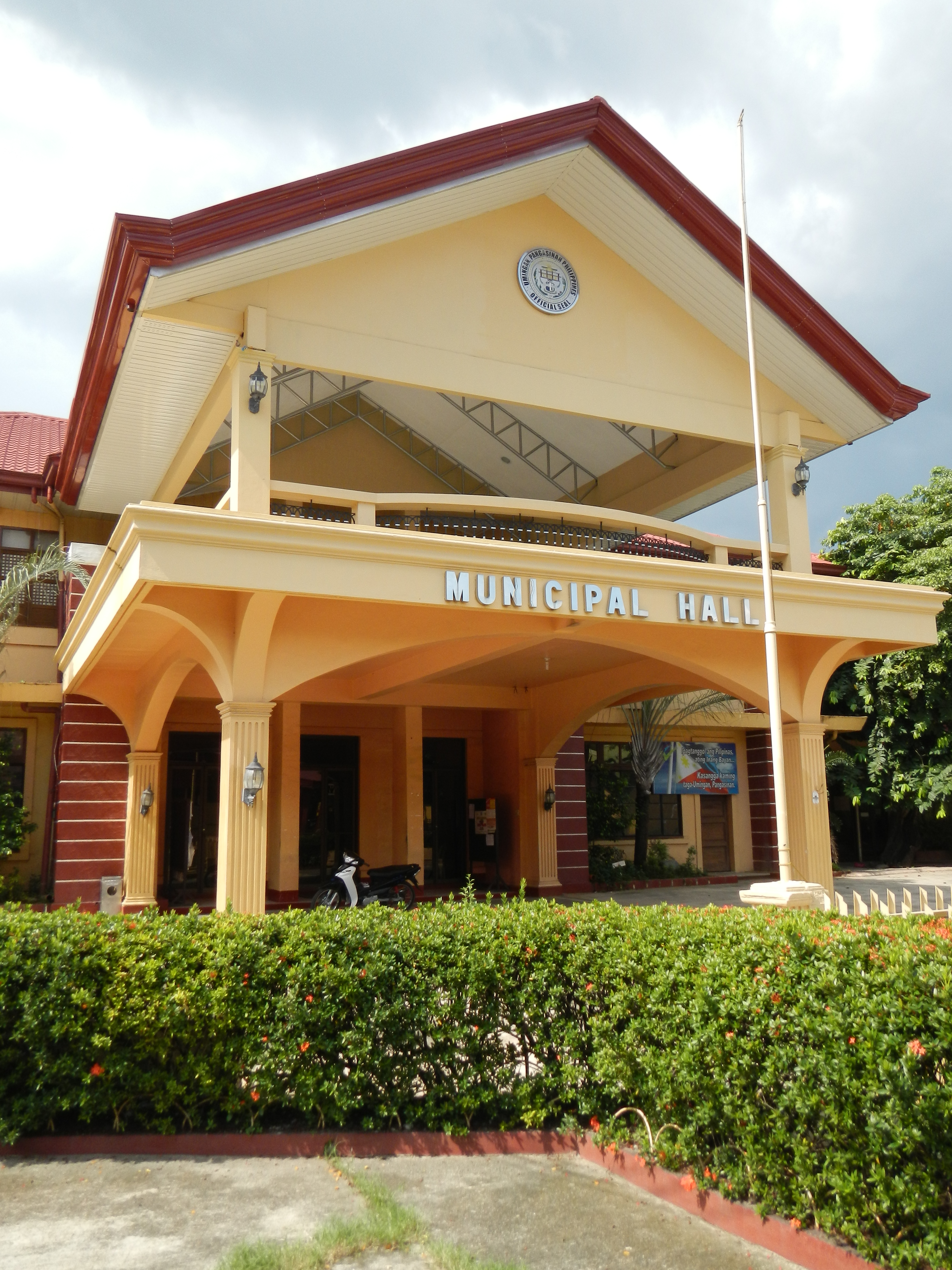
Umingan Town Hall

Umigan is part of the sixth congressional district of the province of Pangasinan. It is governed by a mayor, designated as its local chief executive, and by a municipal council as its legislative body in accordance with the Local Government Code. The mayor, vice mayor, and the councilors are elected directly by the people through an election which is being held every three years.

=== Elected officials ===
Members of the Municipal Council (2022–2025)
Position	Name
Congressman	Marlyn L. Primicias-Agabas
Mayor	Michael Carleone M. Cruz
Vice-Mayor	Chris Evert T. Leynes
Councilors	Jonathan H. Navalta
Councilors	Cesario B. Galleguez
Councilors	Alain Jermen Rabang
Councilors	Fred Fernandez
Councilors	Mar Lee Non Sonaco
Councilors	Jay-ar O. Paz
Councilors	Onyok Onia
Councilors	Maya Membrere

== Education ==
There are two schools district offices which govern all educational institutions within the municipality. These offices oversee the management and operations of all private and public, from primary to secondary schools. These rare the Umingan I Schools District Office, and Umingan I Schools District Office.

=== Primary and elementary schools ===
- Annam Elementary School
- Bantug Elementary School
- Baracbac Elementary School
- Barat Elementary School
- Celestino L. Clariza Elementary School
- Calitlitan Elementary School
- Casilan Elementary School
- Cadiz Elementary School
- Decreto Community School
- Diket Elementary School
- Diaz Elementary School
- Don Montano Elementary School
- Doña Nena Elementary School
- Esperanza Elementary School
- Evangelista Elementary School
- Flores Elementary School
- Gonzales Elementary School
- La Paz Elementary School
- Lubong Elementary School
- Luna Weste Elementary School
- Luna Este Elementary School
- Pemienta Elementary School
- Mantacdang Elementary School
- Maseil-seil-Alo-o Elementary School
- Nampalcan-Molina Elementary School
- Ricos Elementary School
- Rosita Y. Sabado Elementary School
- San Juan Elementary School
- San Leon Elementary School
- San Pablo Elementary School
- San Vicente Elementary School
- Santa Maria Elementary School
- Umingan Central Elementary School
- Christian Life Learning Center
- Divine Shepherd Montessori and High School
- Immaculate Conception Catholic School
- Kingsville Academy Umingan
- Quezon Memorial Academy
- Resurreccion Elementary School

=== Secondary schools ===
- Baracbac National High School
- Cabalitian National High School
- Flores National High School
- La Paz National High School
- Maseil-seil - Alo-o National High School
- Prado National High School
- Umingan Central National High School
- Christian Life Learning Center
- Divine Shepherd Montessori and High School
- Immaculate Conception Catholic School
- Kingsville Academy
- Quezon Memorial Academy

=== Higher educational institutions ===
- Hope of Melbourne Colleges Foundation
- Sta. Catalina's College of Science and Technology | College of Criminology
