= Rosales, Pangasinan =

Municipality in Pangasinan, Philippines

Rosales
- Municipality
- Municipality of Rosales
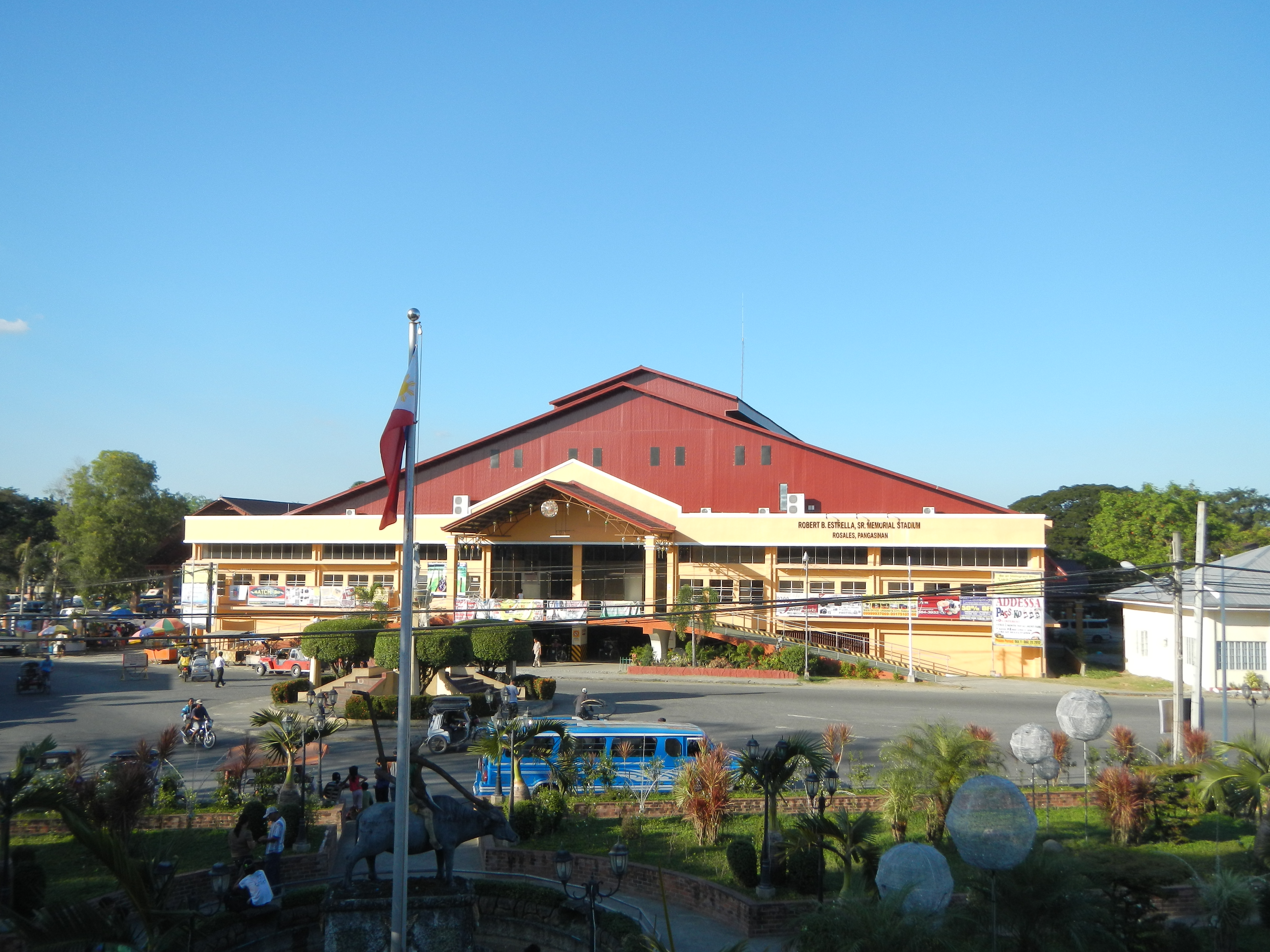
- Robert Estrella Stadium

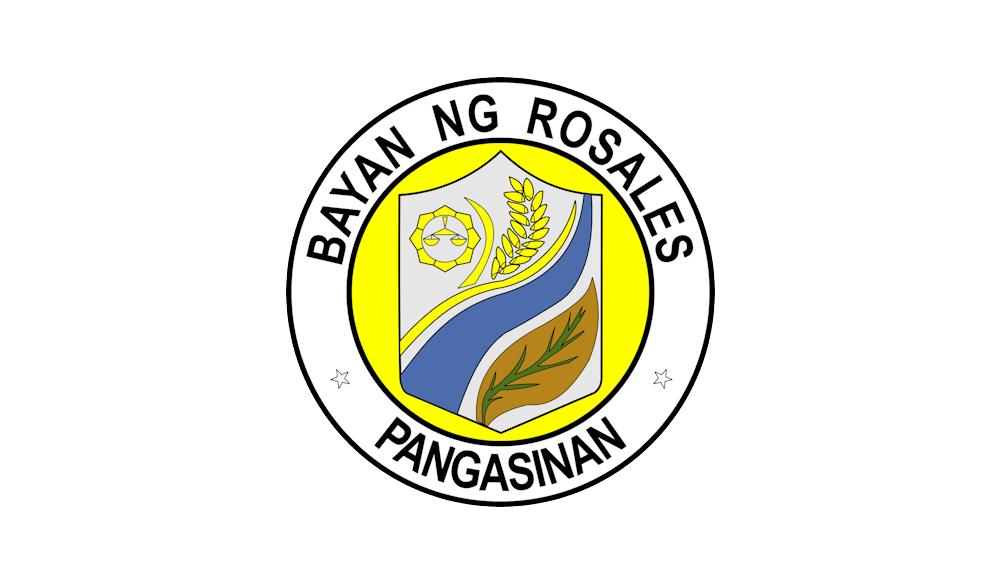
- Flag Seal

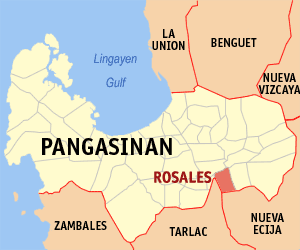
- Map of Pangasinan with Rosales highlighted
- Interactive map of Rosales
- Location within the Philippines
- Coordinates: 15°53′40″N 120°37′58″E
- Country: Philippines
- Region: Ilocos Region
- Province: Pangasinan
- District: 6th district
- Founded: March 16, 1852
- Barangays: 37 (see Barangays)

Government
  - Type: Sangguniang Bayan
  - Mayor: William S. Cezar
  - Vice Mayor: John Isaac Kho
  - Representative: Tyrone D. Agabas
  - Municipal Council: Members: William S. Cezar; Romulo E. Tagalicud; Manolo D. Quiambao; Patrick V. Revita; Antonio P. Muya; Dominador F. Leal Jr.; Leon C. Licudo Jr.; Reymond Niño R. Yu
  - Electorate: 47,656 voters (2025)

Area
  - Total: 66.39 km^{2} (25.63 sq mi)
- Elevation: 39 m (128 ft)
- Highest elevation: 251 m (823 ft)
- Lowest elevation: 23 m (75 ft)

Population (2024 census)
  - Total: 67,510
  - Density: 1,017/km^{2} (2,634/sq mi)
  - Households: 16,862

Economy
  - Income class: 1st municipal income class
  - Poverty incidence: 13.9% (2023)
  - Revenue: ₱ 347.5 million (2024)
  - Assets: ₱ 1,679 million (2024)
  - Expenditure: ₱ 314.2 million (2024)
  - Liabilities: ₱ 290 million (2024)

Service provider
  - Electricity: Pangasinan 3 Electric Cooperative (PANELCO 3)
- Time zone: UTC+8 (PST)
- ZIP code: 2441
- PSGC: 0105531000
- IDD : area code: +63 (0)75
- Native languages: Pangasinan; Ilocano; Tagalog
- Website: www.rosales.gov.ph

Rosales ([ɾɔˈsalɛs]), officially the Municipality of Rosales (Pangasinan: Baley na Rosales; Ilocano: Ili ti Rosales; Tagalog: Bayan ng Rosales), is a municipality in the province of Pangasinan, Philippines. According to the 2024 census, it has a population of 67,510 people.

It is sometimes called Carmen, based on its prominent barangay of the same name (now split into two barangays).

== Etymology ==
It is widely believed that the name Rosales came from the word rosal which is a name of a flower that was known to be abundant in the area. However, Spanish records revealed that Rosales was originally a ranchera founded by a pioneering Filipino named Nicolas Bañez. It was declared a pueblo in 1852. The place was named in honor of Don Antonio Rosales Liberal, a man noted for his rectitude, industry, and learning. He is also an Order of the Royal Audiencia in Manila and a Consejero de Filipinas en el Ministro de Ultramar (Secretary of Foreign Affairs) during that time.

== History ==
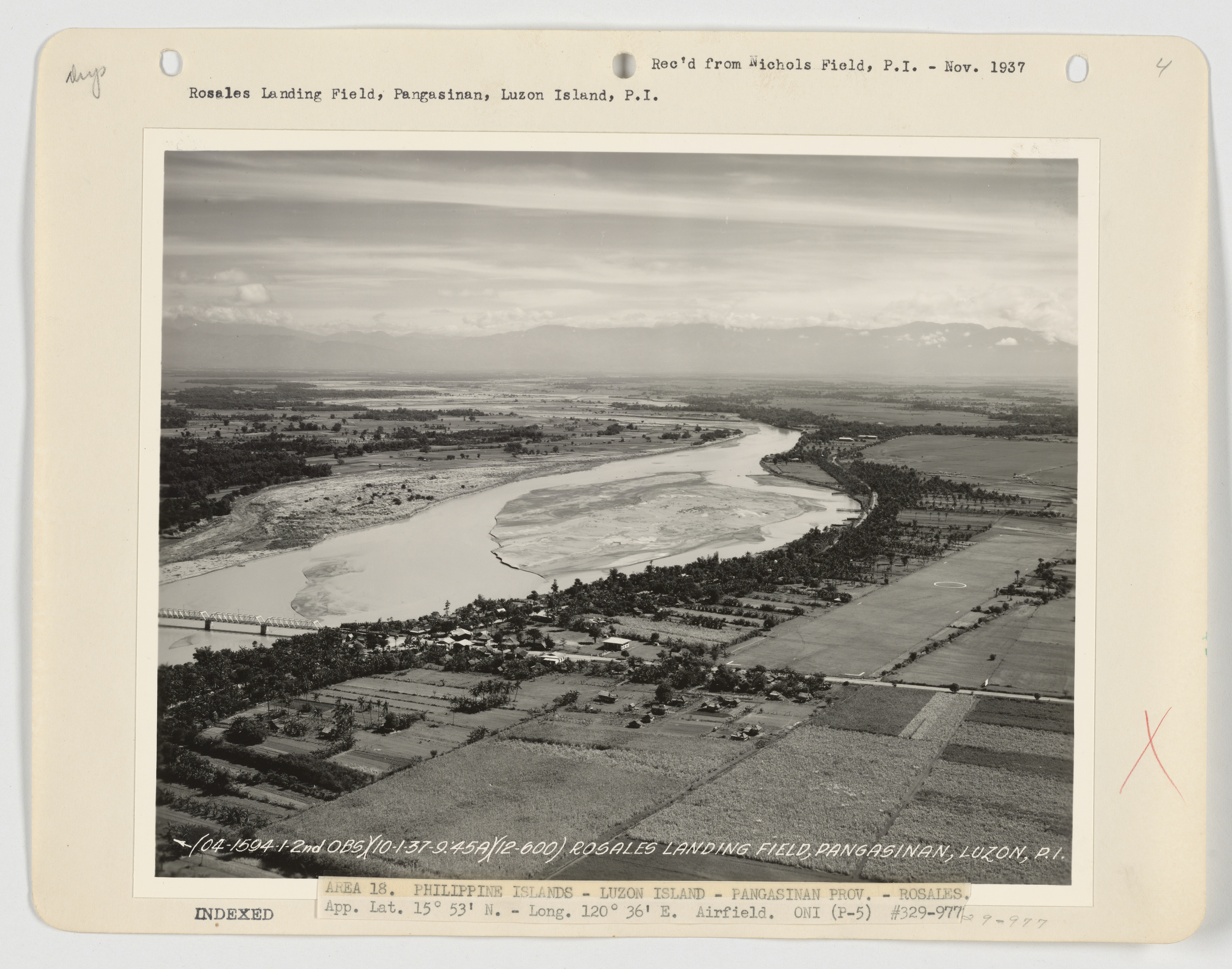
Aerial view of Barrio Carmen, Rosales, circa 1930s

Rosales was created as a separate municipality through a Royal Decree in 1852. It had been part of the province of Nueva Ecija before being finally transferred to the province of Pangasinan. From 1903 to 1906, the town of Balungao was made part of Rosales.

== Geography ==
Rosales is a junction town for those travelling between the provinces of Tarlac and Nueva Ecija to the other towns of Pangasinan. It is accessible via Tarlac–Pangasinan–La Union Expressway (TPLEX), or via the MacArthur Highway. The town itself is dotted with ancestral houses and heritage structures deemed important cultural sites via the National Cultural Heritage Act.

Rosales is situated 56.53 kilometers (35.13 mi) from the provincial capital Lingayen, and 173.17 kilometers (107.60 mi) from the country's capital city of Manila.

=== Barangays ===
Rosales is politically subdivided into 37 barangays. Each barangay consists of puroks and some have sitios.

- Acop
- Bakit-Bakit
- Balincanaway
- Cabalaoangan Norte
- Cabalaoangan Sur
- Camangaan
- Capitan Tomas
- Carmay East
- Carmay West
- Carmen East
- Carmen West
- Casanicolasan
- Coliling
- Calanutan (Don Felix Coloma)
- Don Antonio Village
- Guiling
- Palakipak
- Pangaoan
- Rabago
- Rizal
- Salvacion
- San Antonio
- San Bartolome
- San Isidro
- San Luis
- San Pedro East
- San Pedro West
- San Vicente
- San Angel
- Station District
- Tumana East
- Tumana West
- Zone I (Poblacion)
- Zone IV (Poblacion)
- Zone II (Poblacion)
- Zone III (Poblacion)
- Zone V (Poblacion)

=== Climate ===
Climate data for Rosales, Pangasinan
Month	Jan	Feb	Mar	Apr	May	Jun	Jul	Aug	Sep	Oct	Nov	Dec	Year
Mean daily maximum °C (°F)	29 (84)	29 (84)	30 (86)	32 (90)	33 (91)	33 (91)	33 (91)	33 (91)	33 (91)	32 (90)	31 (88)	29 (84)	31 (88)
Mean daily minimum °C (°F)	21 (70)	21 (70)	22 (72)	23 (73)	24 (75)	24 (75)	24 (75)	24 (75)	23 (73)	23 (73)	22 (72)	21 (70)	23 (73)
Average precipitation mm (inches)	127.5 (5.02)	115.8 (4.56)	129.7 (5.11)	141.1 (5.56)	248.2 (9.77)	165 (6.5)	185.3 (7.30)	161.9 (6.37)	221.4 (8.72)	299.5 (11.79)	199 (7.8)	188.7 (7.43)	2,183.1 (85.93)
Average rainy days	17	17	17	15	20	19	19	20	21	20	17	19	221
Source: World Weather Online

== Demographics ==
Population census of Rosales

Year	Pop.	±% p.a.
1903	8,562	—
1918	12,806	+2.72%
1939	15,837	+1.02%
1948	19,851	+2.54%
1960	24,347	+1.72%
1970	29,530	+1.95%
1975	34,355	+3.08%
1980	36,582	+1.26%

Year	Pop.	±% p.a.
1990	45,275	+2.16%
1995	47,616	+0.95%
2000	52,086	+1.94%
2007	57,702	+1.42%
2010	59,687	+1.24%
2015	63,081	+1.06%
2020	66,711	+1.18%
2024	67,510	+0.29%

Source: Philippine Statistics Authority

== Economy ==
Poverty incidence of Rosales (%)

Source: Philippine Statistics Authority

Livelihood and products

- Chopping Board Industry (Acop)
- Charcoal (Acop)
- Tupig & Tinapa (Smoked Fish) (Carmen)
- Patupat (Balincanaway)
- Rice/Palay Producer

== Government ==
=== Local government ===
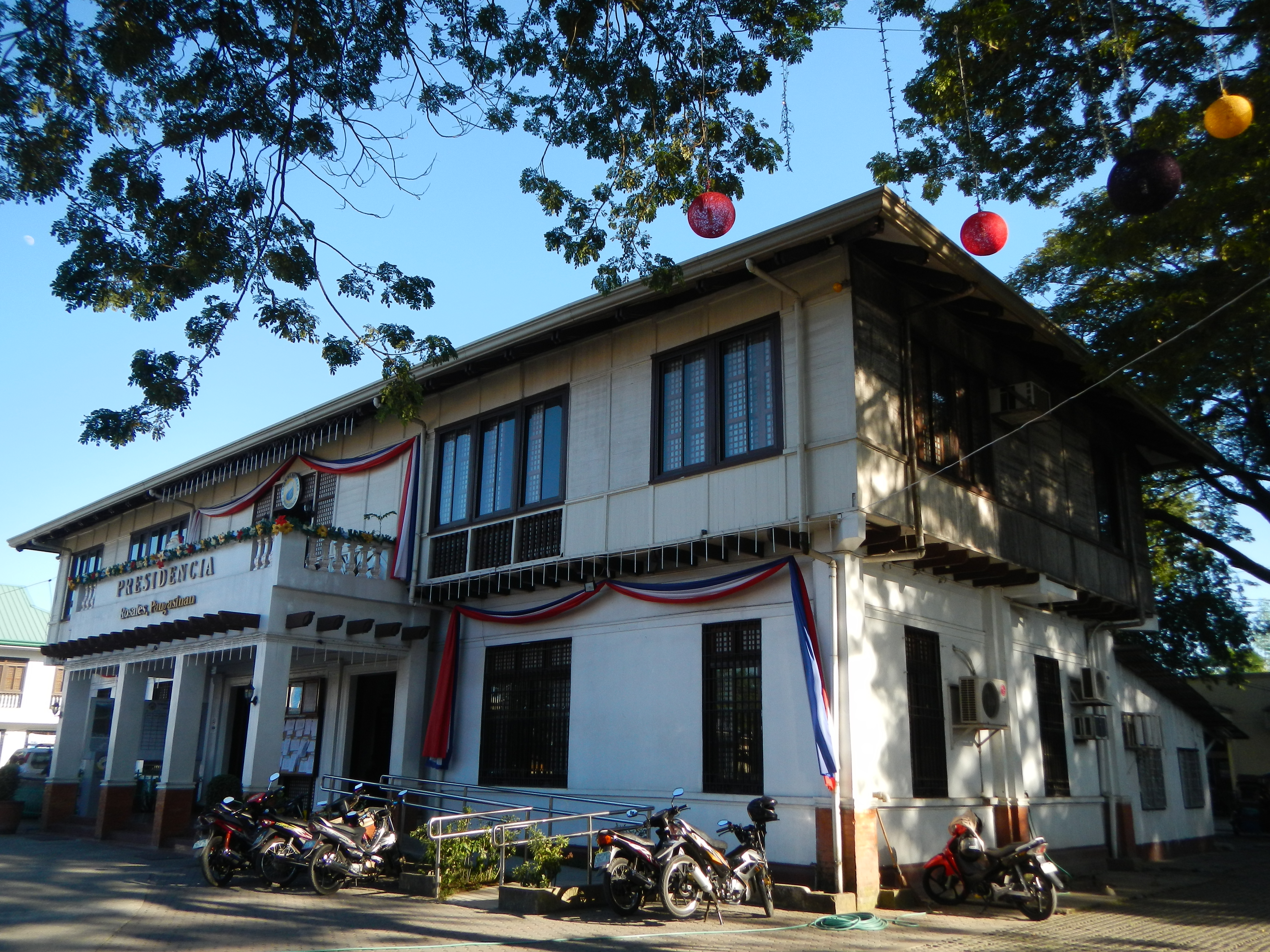
Presidencia (town hall)

Rosales is part of the sixth congressional district of the province of Pangasinan. It is governed by a mayor, designated as its local chief executive, and by a municipal council as its legislative body in accordance with the Local Government Code. The mayor, vice mayor, and the councilors are elected directly by the people through an election which is being held every three years.

=== Presidencia ===
The Presidencia (Town hall) is located in front of the Robert B. Estrella Stadium in Poblacion. In 1924, the construction of the Presidencia building (Municipal Town Hall) was completed and became the seat of the municipal government. The heritage building was renovated in 2004-2007 under the administration of Mayor Ricardo V. Revita with his Revitalize Rosales banner.

== Tourism ==
=== Landmarks ===
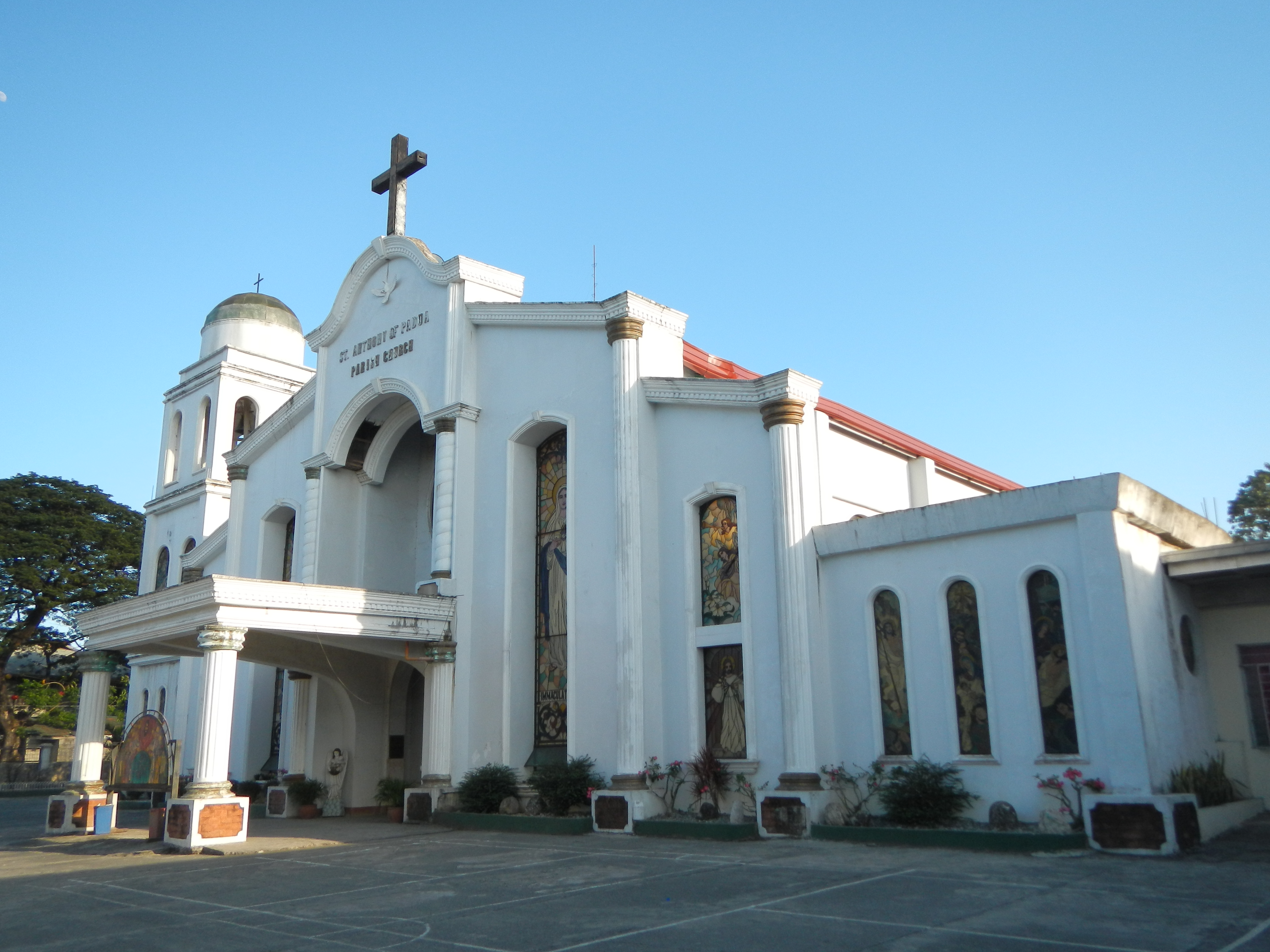
St. Anthony of Padua Parish Church

- Robert B. Estrella Stadium
- Ramon Magsaysay Monument
- Tomb of The Unknown Soldiers
- Presidencia

=== Nature and Adventure ===
- Acop Dam
- Don Feliciano Salim Forest and Dam
- Salvacion Dam
- Acop Cold Springs and Waterfall
- Rosales Aviary/Mini Zoo
- Eco-Tourism Site of Rosales
- Ibtor Challenge (Sports) Festival of Rosales

=== St. Anthony of Padua Parish Church ===
St. Anthony of Padua Parish Church is part of the Roman Catholic Diocese of Urdaneta (Roman Catholic Archdiocese of Lingayen-Dagupan), at Rosales. Through a decree of the Vicar-General of the Archbishopric Authority of Manila, the Catholic Church was restored on February 15, 1915. A modest shed-like barong-barung was built at the present site of the church. Fr. Nicasio Mabanta was the first Parish Priest.

Within 3 years, a much sturdier building with GI sheets as roofing and sawali walls was constructed. Father Antonio Salindong was assigned, with longest tenure ever, continued the improvement with construction of concrete wall and facade with the image of St. Anthony. In 1946, a strong tornado tore off the GI sheet roof of the Church. Conrado Estrella, Sr. restored the roof with donations of the residents.

During the term of Fr. Primo Garcia (1979-1986), the church was expanded in its east and west wings, the beginning of the construction of the parish center, and fencing of the whole premises. Msgr. Geronimo Marcelino begun the renovations of the Parish Rectory and completed by Fr. Diomedes Laguerta.

=== Our Lady of Rosales Grotto ===
The Grotto, which is located at Station District, is regularly visited by President Gloria Macapagal Arroyo (for spiritual atonement and guidance) and local and foreign tourists.

=== Ancient dugout ===
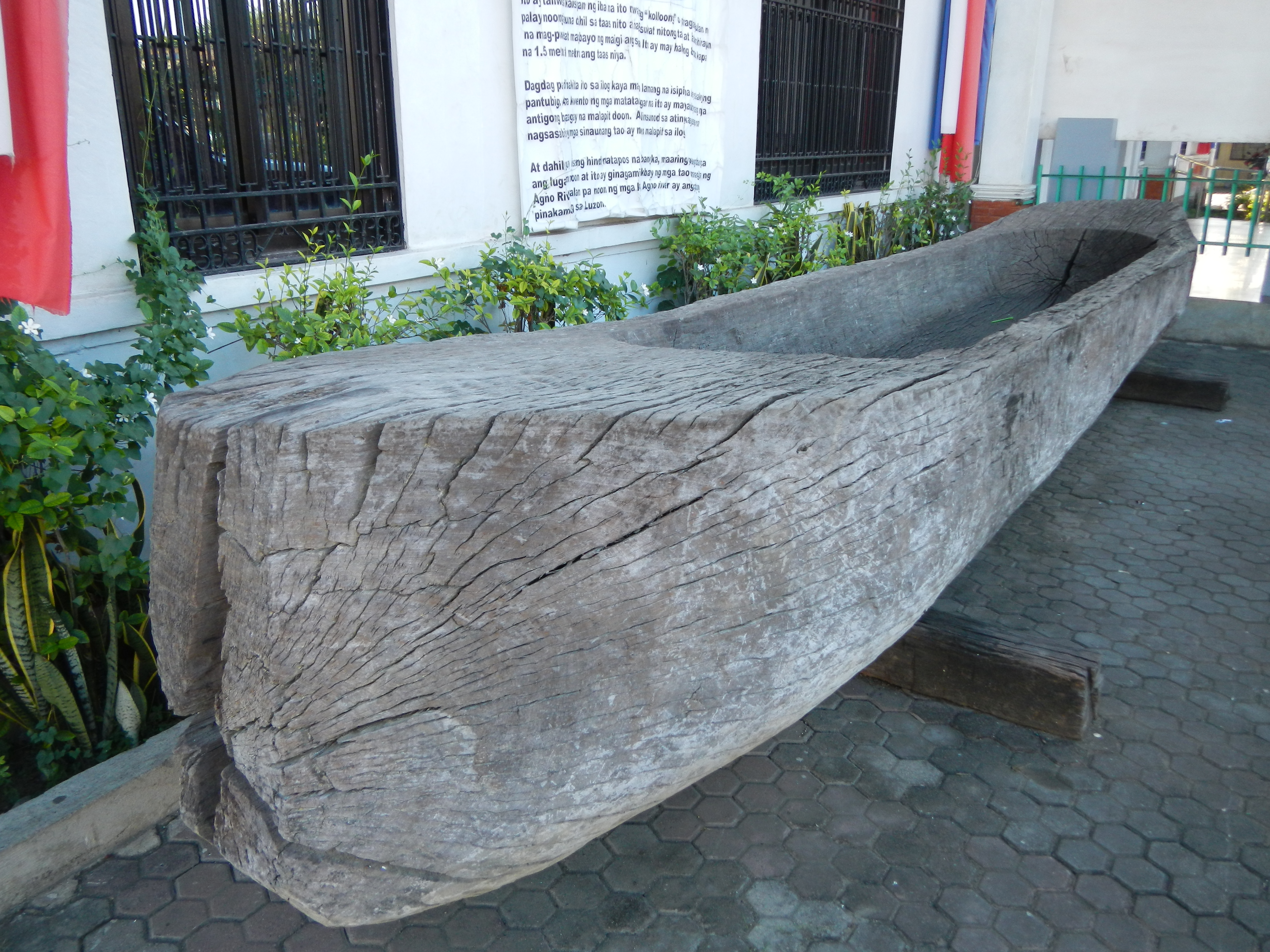
Centuries-old unfinished dugout boat

A centuries-old unfinished dugout, a big banca (five tons, measuring 8 by 2 by 1.5 meters), was accidentally retrieved in November 2010 by Mayor Ricardo Revita at Barangay Casanicolasan in the Lagasit River, near the Agno River. It was display in front of the Presidencia or Municipal Town Hall but later remove during renovation of Presidencia (town hall).

== Education ==
There are two schools district offices which govern all educational institutions within the municipality. They oversee the management and operations of all private and public, from primary to secondary schools. These are Rosales I Schools District Office, and Rosales II Schools District Office.

=== Primary and elementary schools ===
- Acop Elementary School
- Bakit-Bakit Elementary School
- Balincanaway Elementary School
- Cabalaoangan Elementary School
- Calanutan Elementary School
- Camangaan Elementary School
- Capitan Tomas Pine Elementary School
- Carmay Elementary School
- Carmen Elementary School
- Casanicolasan Elementary School
- Escuela de San Antonio
- Guiling-Coliling Elementary School
- IFI Christian Home & Institute of Learning & Development
- Li Seng Giap Elementary School
- Palakipak Elementary School
- Pangaoan Elementary School
- Rabago Elementary School
- Rizal Elementary School
- Rosales North Central School
- Rosales South Central School
- Salvacion Elementary School
- San Angel Elementary School
- San Antonio Elementary School
- San Bartolome Elementary School
- San Isidro Elementary School
- San Luis Elementary School
- San Pedro East Elementary School
- San Pedro West Elementary School
- San Vicente Elementary School
- Sitio Baong Elementary School
- Tomana Elementary School SPED Center

=== Secondary schools ===
- Divine Grace Montessori and High School of Rosales
- Guiling-Coliling National High School
- Robert B. Estrella Memorial National High School
- Rosales National High School
- San Luis National High School

== Notable personalities ==
- Carmen Rosales - Filipino actress and World War II guerilla fighter. 2 barangays were named after her.
- Francisco Sionil José - National Artist of the Philippines for Literature and internationally renowned novelist, he has set a monument to the town he grew up in with his five-novels-series The Rosales Saga.

== Sister towns ==
Rosales currently has no legally-declared townhood/cityhood relationships, however, it has good economic and tourist ties with Guimba, Nueva Ecija and Cuyapo, Nueva Ecija.

== Gallery ==
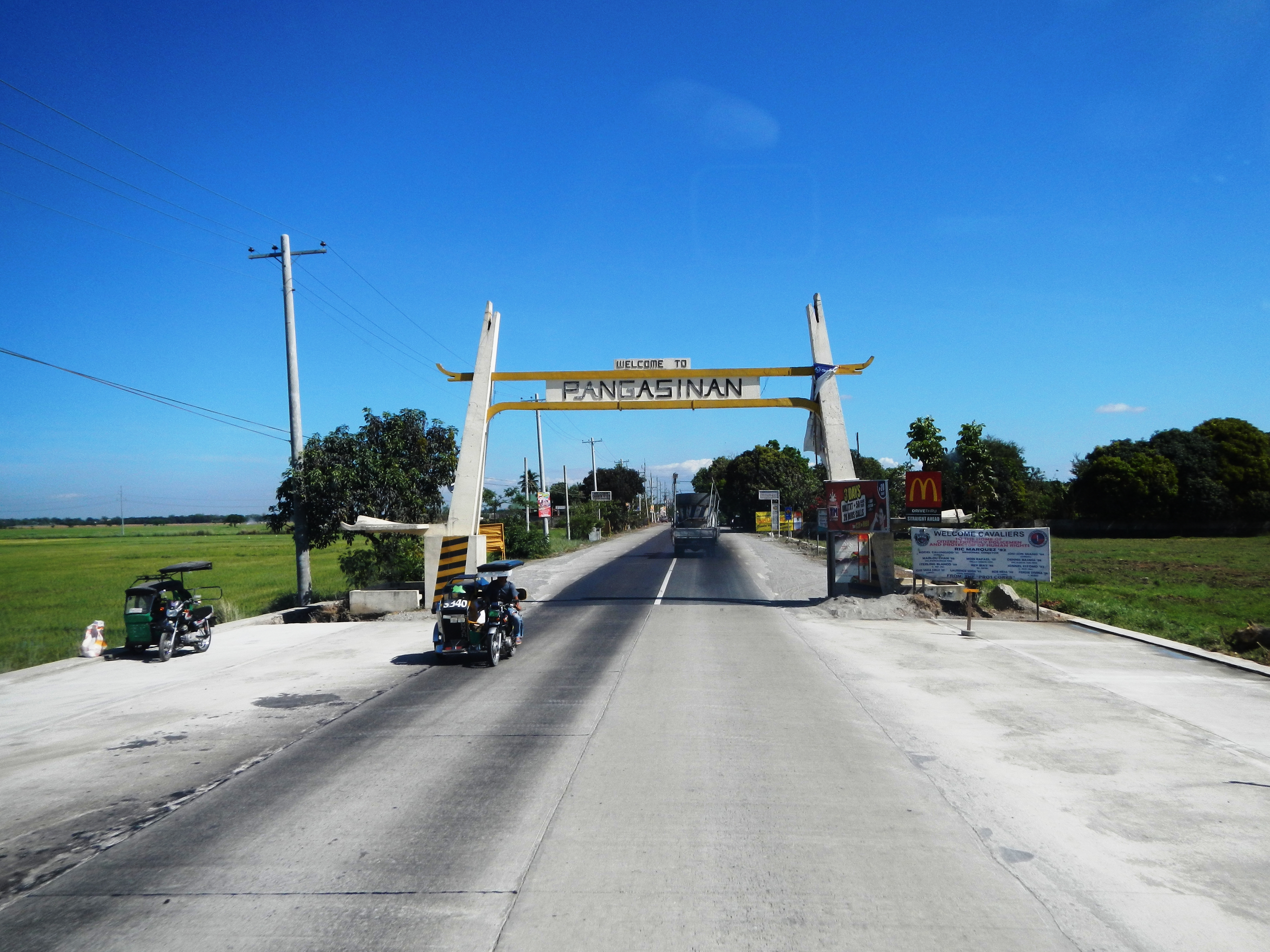
Rosales: The Gateway of Pangasinan and Ilocos Region

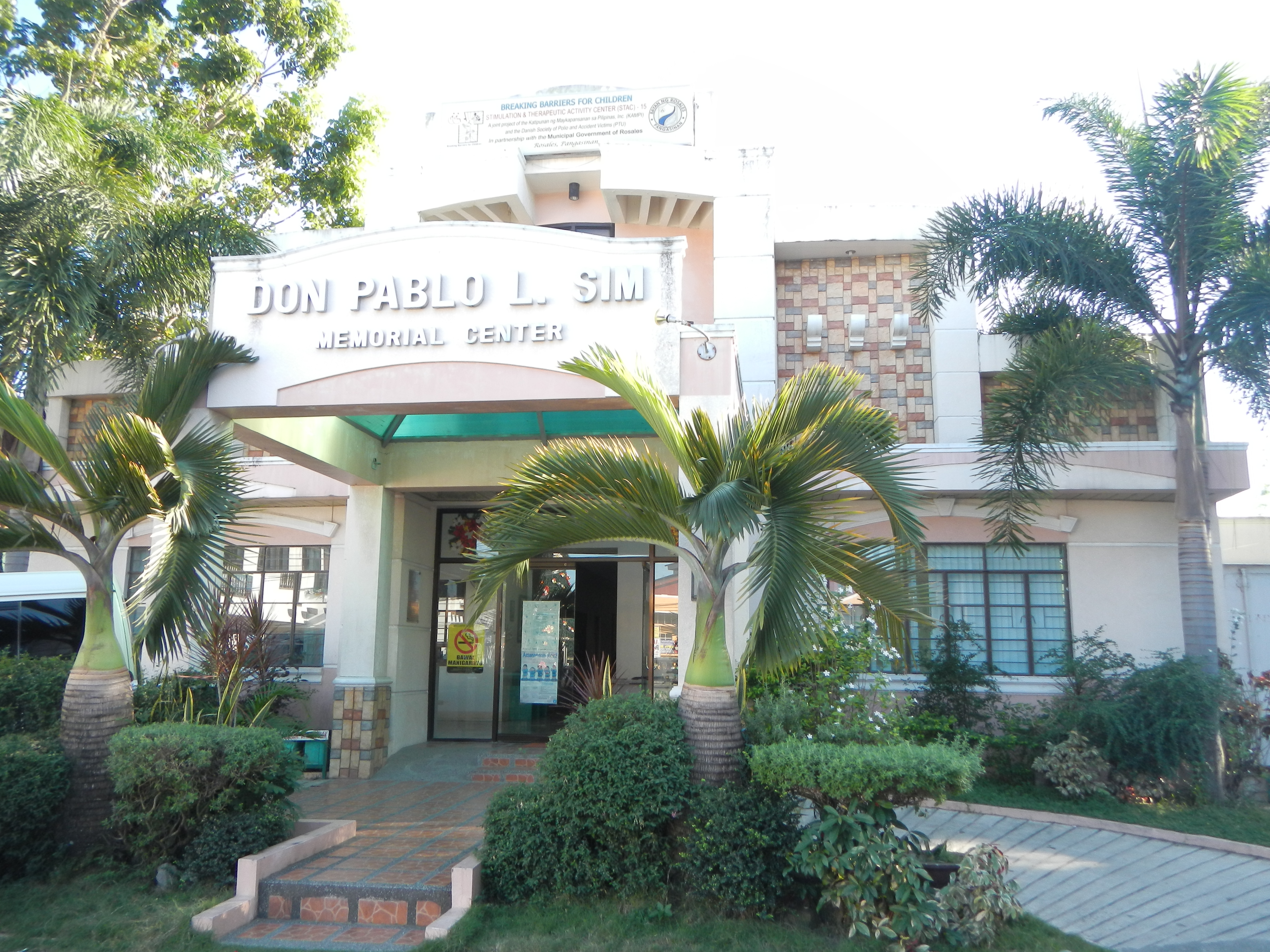
Pablo Lim Sim Memorial Building

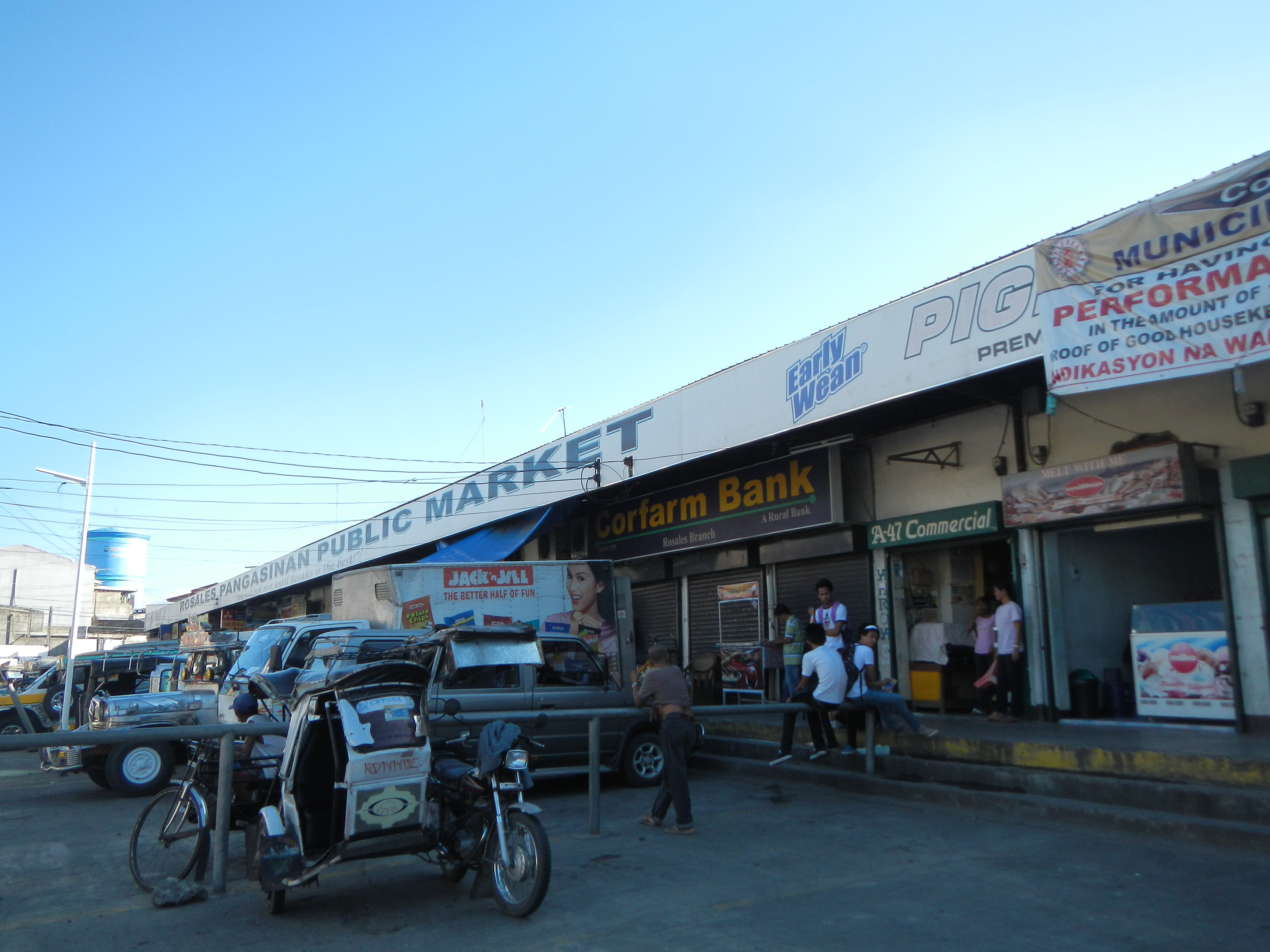
Rosales Public Market

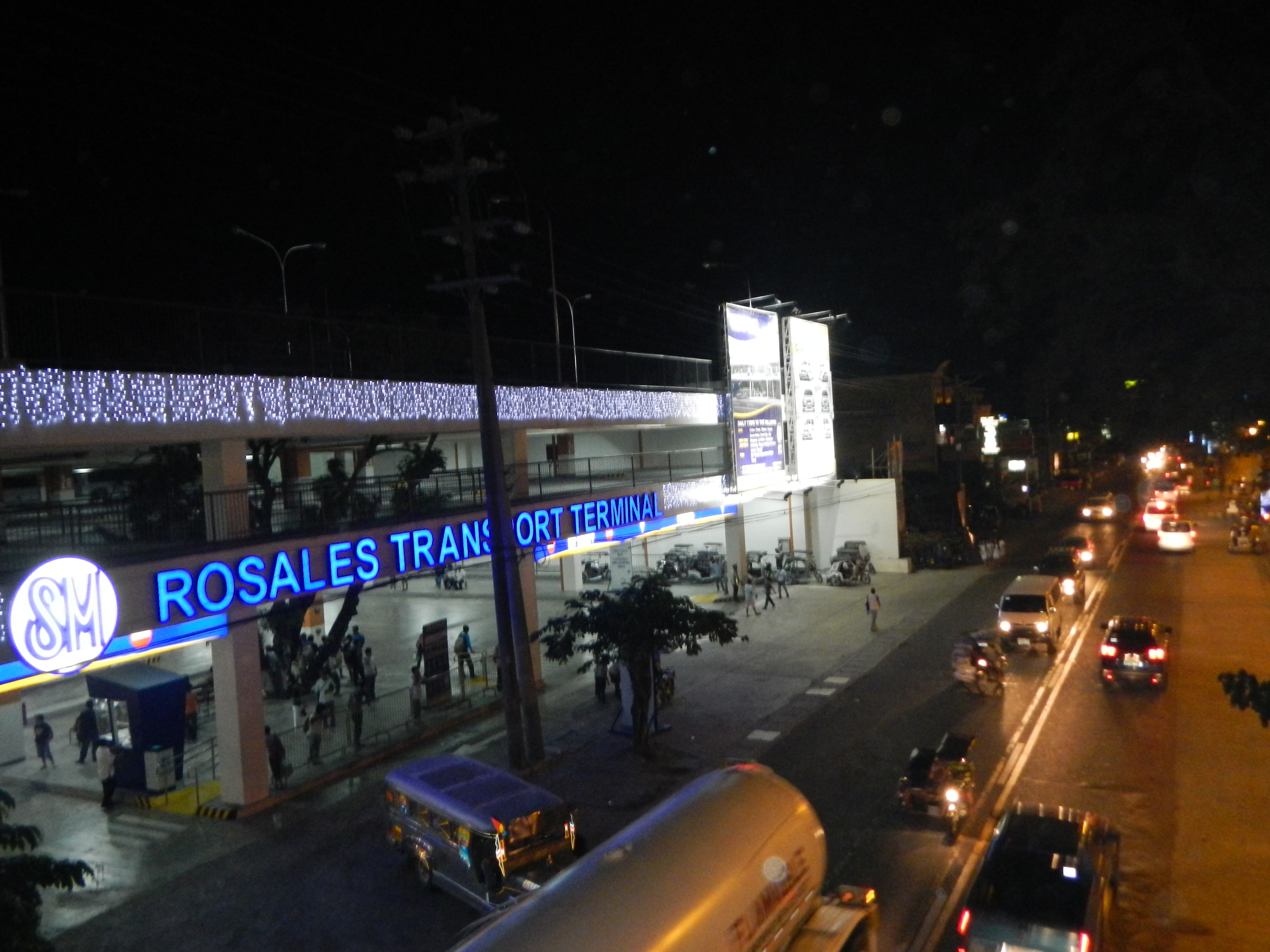
The center of business at night (SM City Rosales)

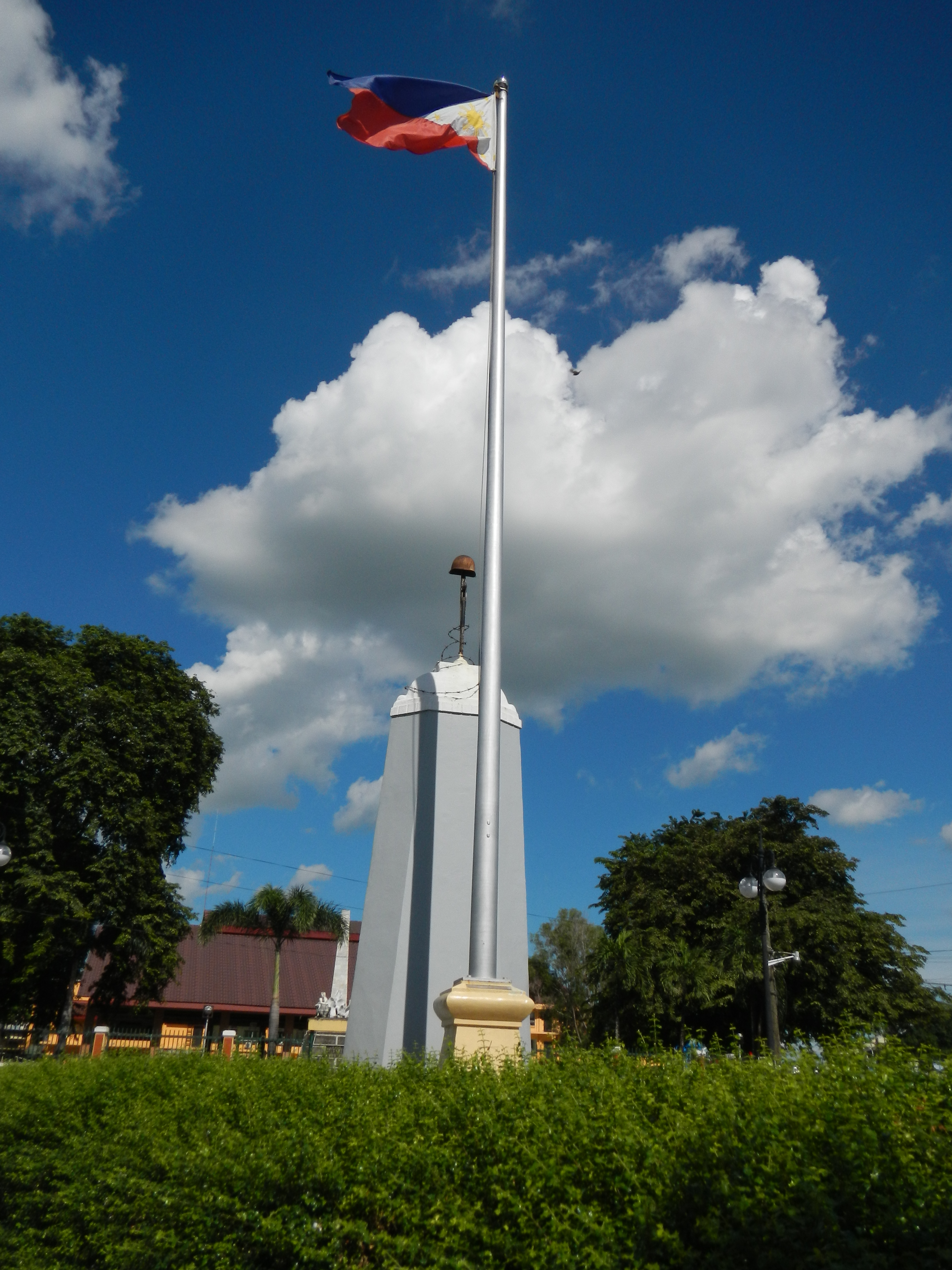
Unknown Soldier Monument

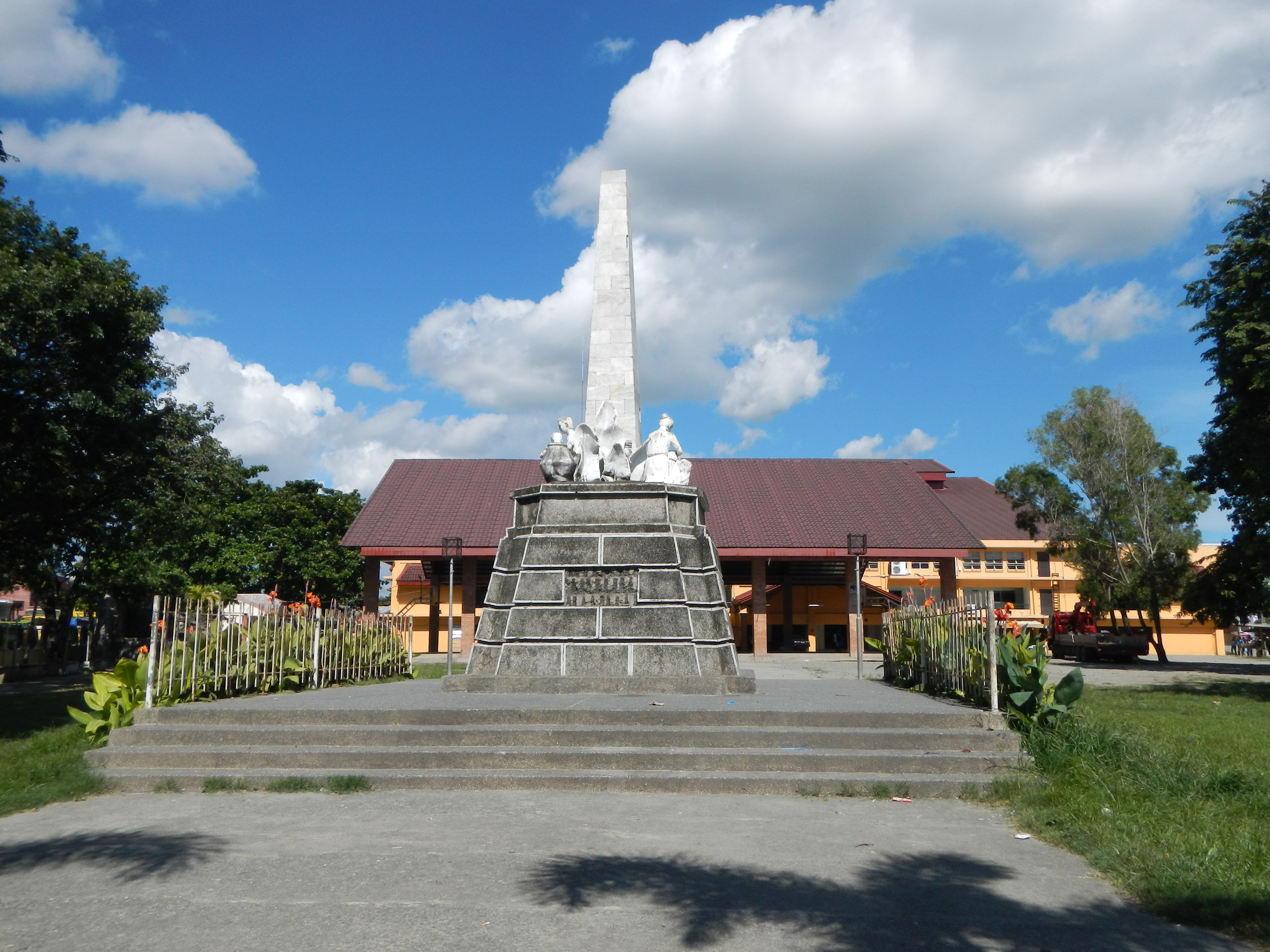
Rizal Park
