= Administrative divisions of Pangasinan =

The province of Pangasinan is divided into 44 municipalities, 3 component cities, and 1 independent component city, all of which are organized into six legislative districts. There are a total of 1,364 barangays in the province.

== List of cities and municipalities ==
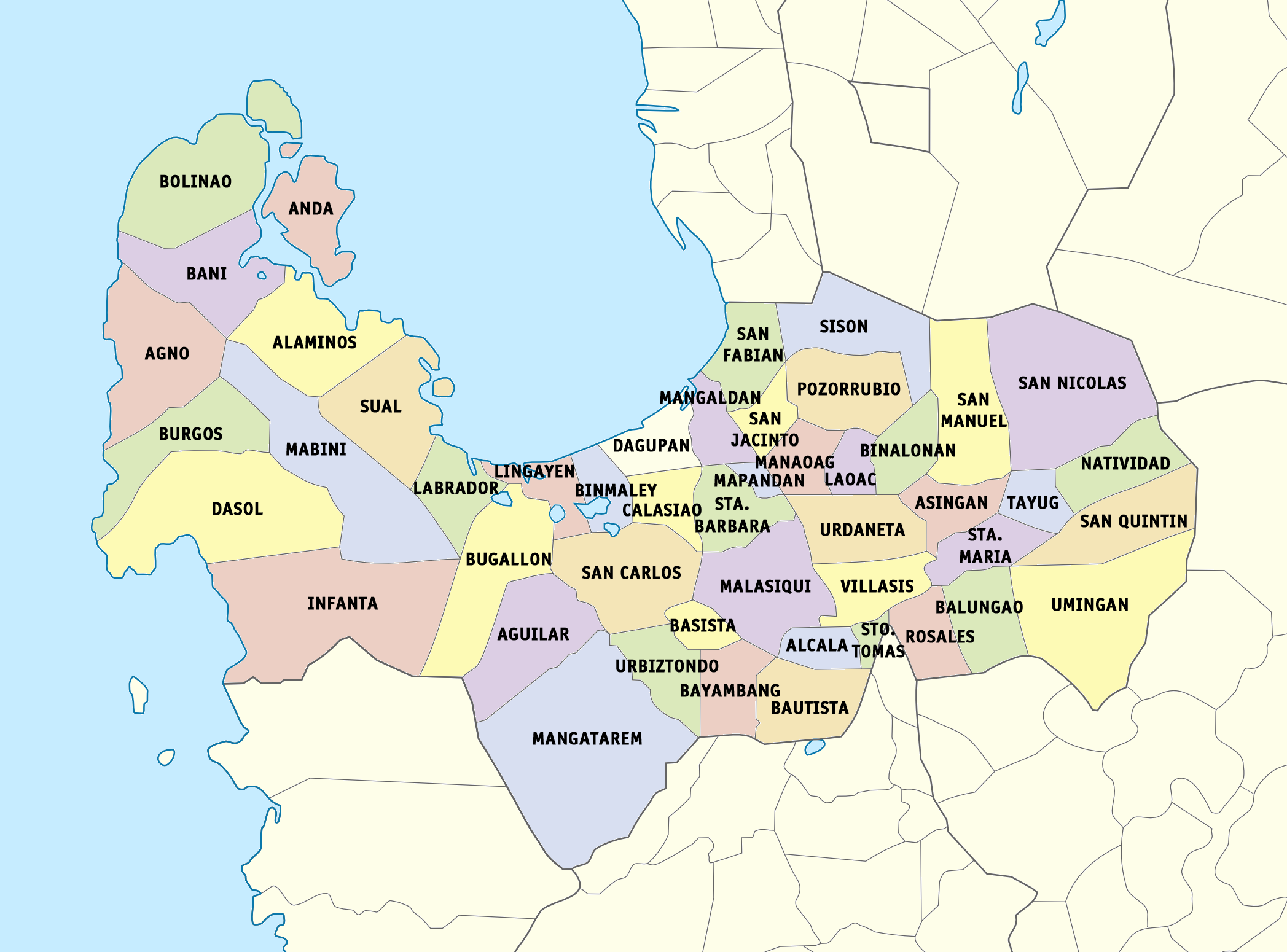
Political map of Pangasinan

- † Capital municipality
- ^ Independent component city
- ∗ Component city
- Municipality

Municipality or city		District	Area		Population (2020)		Density		No. of barangays	Coordinates^{[A]} (sorted N—S)	Map^{[B]} (sorted W—E)
Municipality or city		District	km^{2}	mi^{2}		%	/km^{2}	/mi^{2}	No. of barangays	Coordinates^{[A]} (sorted N—S)	Map^{[B]} (sorted W—E)
Agno		1st	169.75 km^{2}	65.54 sq mi	29,947	0.9%	180/km^{2}	470/sq mi	17	16°06′51″N 119°48′10″E	
Aguilar		2nd	195.07 km^{2}	75.32 sq mi	45,100	1.4%	230/km^{2}	600/sq mi	16	15°53′19″N 120°14′22″E	
Alaminos	∗	1st	164.26 km^{2}	63.42 sq mi	99,397	3.1%	610/km^{2}	1,600/sq mi	39	16°09′23″N 119°58′49″E	
Alcala		8th	45.71 km^{2}	17.65 sq mi	48,908	1.5%	1,100/km^{2}	2,800/sq mi	21	15°50′39″N 120°31′17″E	
Anda		1st	74.55 km^{2}	28.78 sq mi	41,548	1.3%	560/km^{2}	1,500/sq mi	18	16°17′24″N 119°57′05″E	
Asingan		6th	66.64 km^{2}	25.73 sq mi	57,811	1.8%	870/km^{2}	2,300/sq mi	21	16°00′13″N 120°40′13″E	
Balungao		6th	73.25 km^{2}	28.28 sq mi	30,004	0.9%	410/km^{2}	1,100/sq mi	20	15°53′54″N 120°40′21″E	
Bani		1st	179.65 km^{2}	69.36 sq mi	52,603	1.7%	290/km^{2}	750/sq mi	27	16°11′00″N 119°51′45″E	
Basista		8th	24 km^{2}	9.3 sq mi	37,679	1.2%	1,600/km^{2}	4,100/sq mi	13	15°51′08″N 120°24′09″E	
Bautista		8th	46.33 km^{2}	17.89 sq mi	35,398	1.1%	760/km^{2}	2,000/sq mi	18	15°48′40″N 120°28′36″E	
Bayambang		8th	143.94 km^{2}	55.58 sq mi	129,011	4.1%	900/km^{2}	2,300/sq mi	77	15°48′32″N 120°27′14″E	
Binalonan		7th	58.05 km^{2}	22.41 sq mi	56,382	1.8%	970/km^{2}	2,500/sq mi	24	16°02′40″N 120°35′30″E	
Binmaley		2nd	118.5 km^{2}	45.8 sq mi	86,881	2.7%	730/km^{2}	1,900/sq mi	33	16°01′50″N 120°16′10″E	
Bolinao		1st	197.22 km^{2}	76.15 sq mi	83,979	2.7%	430/km^{2}	1,100/sq mi	30	16°23′08″N 119°53′40″E	
Bugallon		2nd	189.64 km^{2}	73.22 sq mi	74,962	2.4%	400/km^{2}	1,000/sq mi	24	15°57′14″N 120°12′54″E	
Burgos		1st	131.32 km^{2}	50.70 sq mi	23,749	0.8%	180/km^{2}	470/sq mi	14	16°03′33″N 119°51′54″E	
Calasiao		4th	48.36 km^{2}	18.67 sq mi	100,471	3.2%	2,100/km^{2}	5,400/sq mi	24	16°00′32″N 120°21′26″E	
Dagupan	^	4th	37.23 km^{2}	14.37 sq mi	174,302	5.5%	4,700/km^{2}	12,000/sq mi	31	16°02′33″N 120°20′15″E	
Dasol		1st	166.6 km^{2}	64.3 sq mi	31,355	1%	190/km^{2}	490/sq mi	18	15°59′25″N 119°52′52″E	
Infanta		1st	254.29 km^{2}	98.18 sq mi	26,242	0.8%	100/km^{2}	260/sq mi	13	15°49′30″N 119°54′20″E	
Labrador		2nd	90.99 km^{2}	35.13 sq mi	26,811	0.8%	290/km^{2}	750/sq mi	10	16°01′32″N 120°08′43″E	
Laoac		7th	40.5 km^{2}	15.6 sq mi	34,128	1.1%	840/km^{2}	2,200/sq mi	22	16°02′53″N 120°32′50″E	
Lingayen	†	2nd	62.76 km^{2}	24.23 sq mi	107,728	3.4%	1,700/km^{2}	4,400/sq mi	32	16°01′14″N 120°13′50″E	
Mabini		1st	291.01 km^{2}	112.36 sq mi	26,454	0.8%	91/km^{2}	240/sq mi	16	16°04′11″N 119°56′22″E	
Malasiqui		3rd	131.37 km^{2}	50.72 sq mi	143,094	4.5%	1,100/km^{2}	2,800/sq mi	73	15°55′09″N 120°24′50″E	
Manaoag		5th	55.95 km^{2}	21.60 sq mi	76,045	2.4%	1,400/km^{2}	3,600/sq mi	26	16°02′34″N 120°29′15″E	
Mangaldan		4th	48.17 km^{2}	18.60 sq mi	113,185	3.6%	2,300/km^{2}	6,000/sq mi	30	16°04′00″N 120°24′04″E	
Mangatarem		8th	317.5 km^{2}	122.6 sq mi	79,323	2.5%	250/km^{2}	650/sq mi	82	15°47′19″N 120°17′38″E	
Mapandan		5th	21.01 km^{2}	8.11 sq mi	38,058	1.2%	1,800/km^{2}	4,700/sq mi	15	16°01′26″N 120°27′13″E	
Natividad		6th	134.36 km^{2}	51.88 sq mi	25,771	0.8%	190/km^{2}	490/sq mi	18	16°02′34″N 120°47′41″E	
Pozorrubio		5th	134.6 km^{2}	52.0 sq mi	74,729	2.4%	560/km^{2}	1,500/sq mi	34	16°06′37″N 120°32′45″E	
Rosales		7th	66.39 km^{2}	25.63 sq mi	66,711	2.1%	1,000/km^{2}	2,600/sq mi	37	15°53′29″N 120°37′59″E	
San Carlos City	∗	3rd	169.03 km^{2}	65.26 sq mi	205,424	6.5%	1,200/km^{2}	3,100/sq mi	86	15°55′40″N 120°20′52″E	
San Fabian		5th	81.28 km^{2}	31.38 sq mi	87,428	2.8%	1,100/km^{2}	2,800/sq mi	34	16°07′35″N 120°24′12″E	
San Jacinto		5th	44.18 km^{2}	17.06 sq mi	44,351	1.4%	1,000/km^{2}	2,600/sq mi	19	16°04′25″N 120°26′13″E	
San Manuel		6th	129.18 km^{2}	49.88 sq mi	54,271	1.7%	420/km^{2}	1,100/sq mi	14	16°03′51″N 120°40′05″E	
San Nicolas		6th	210.2 km^{2}	81.2 sq mi	39,778	1.3%	190/km^{2}	490/sq mi	33	16°04′13″N 120°45′45″E	
San Quintin		6th	115.9 km^{2}	44.7 sq mi	33,980	1.1%	290/km^{2}	750/sq mi	21	15°59′03″N 120°48′47″E	
Santa Barbara		3rd	61.37 km^{2}	23.70 sq mi	92,187	2.9%	1,500/km^{2}	3,900/sq mi	29	16°00′00″N 120°24′18″E	
Santa Maria		6th	69.5 km^{2}	26.8 sq mi	34,220	1.1%	490/km^{2}	1,300/sq mi	23	15°58′45″N 120°42′01″E	
Santo Tomas		7th	13.43 km^{2}	5.19 sq mi	14,878	0.5%	1,100/km^{2}	2,800/sq mi	10	15°52′42″N 120°35′10″E	
Sison		5th	81.88 km^{2}	31.61 sq mi	52,320	1.7%	640/km^{2}	1,700/sq mi	28	16°10′21″N 120°30′37″E	
Sual		2nd	130.16 km^{2}	50.26 sq mi	39,091	1.2%	300/km^{2}	780/sq mi	19	16°04′00″N 120°05′42″E	
Tayug		6th	51.24 km^{2}	19.78 sq mi	45,241	1.4%	880/km^{2}	2,300/sq mi	21	16°01′40″N 120°44′41″E	
Umingan		6th	258.43 km^{2}	99.78 sq mi	77,074	2.4%	300/km^{2}	780/sq mi	58	15°55′36″N 120°50′26″E	
Urbiztondo		8th	81.8 km^{2}	31.6 sq mi	55,557	1.8%	680/km^{2}	1,800/sq mi	21	15°49′24″N 120°19′46″E	
Urdaneta	∗	7th	98.21 km^{2}	37.92 sq mi	144,577	4.6%	1,500/km^{2}	3,900/sq mi	34	15°58′31″N 120°34′01″E	
Villasis		7th	75.83 km^{2}	29.28 sq mi	65,047	2.1%	860/km^{2}	2,200/sq mi	21	15°54′05″N 120°35′18″E	
Pangasinan Total^{[C]}		1st - 8th	5,450.59 km^{2}	2,104.48 sq mi	3,163,190	100%	580/km^{2}	1,500/sq mi	1,364	15.9151°N 120.2879°E^{[D]} (View at OpenStreetMap)	
1. ^{↑}Coordinates mark the town center, and are sortable by latitude.; 2. ^{↑}Map locator images can be sorted according to longitude, which likewise indicates the town/city center.; 3. ^{↑}All total figures include the independent city of Dagupan and the component cities of Alaminos, San Carlos and Urdaneta.; 4. ^{↑}Indicates the generic (central) geographic area of the province

== See also ==
- Legislative districts of Pangasinan
- List of barangays in Pangasinan
