= Pangasinan =

Province in Ilocos Region, Philippines

- Province
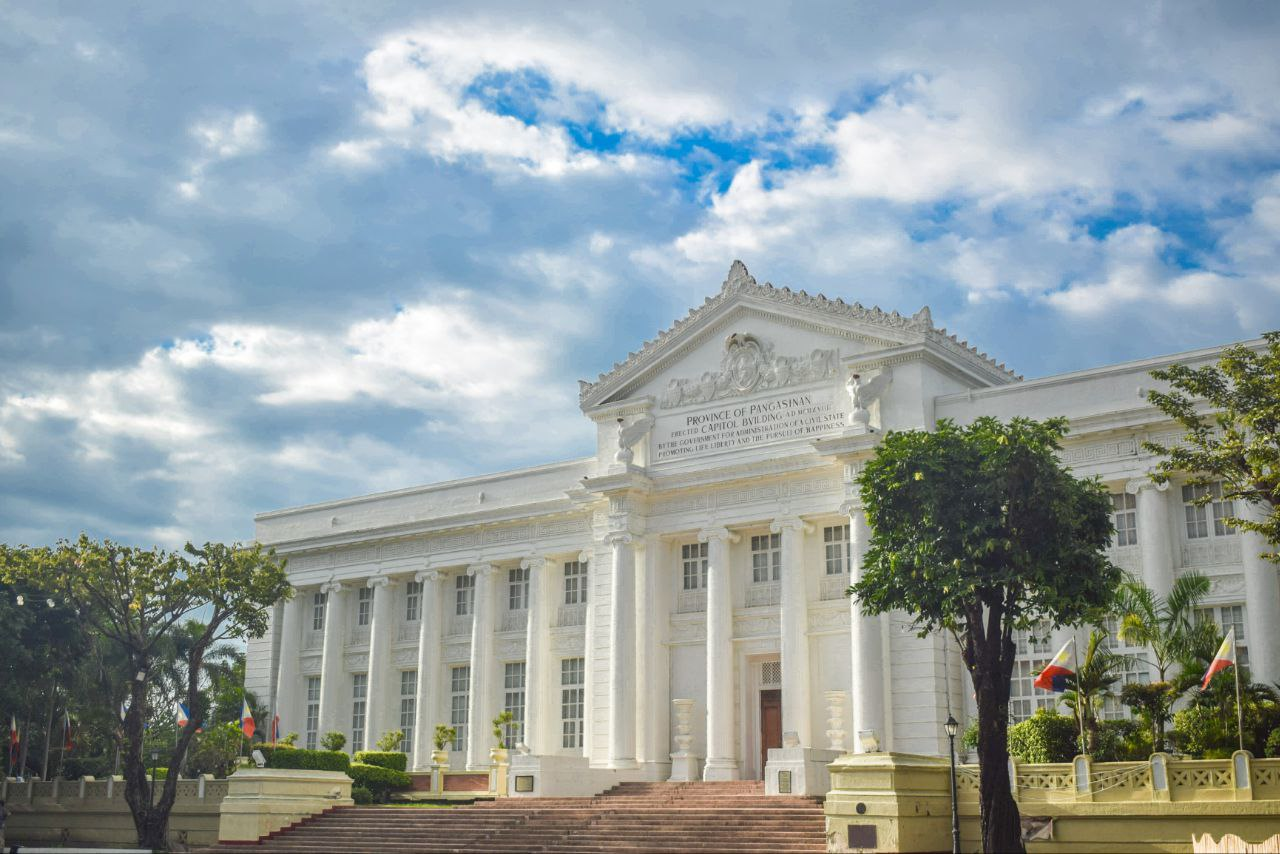
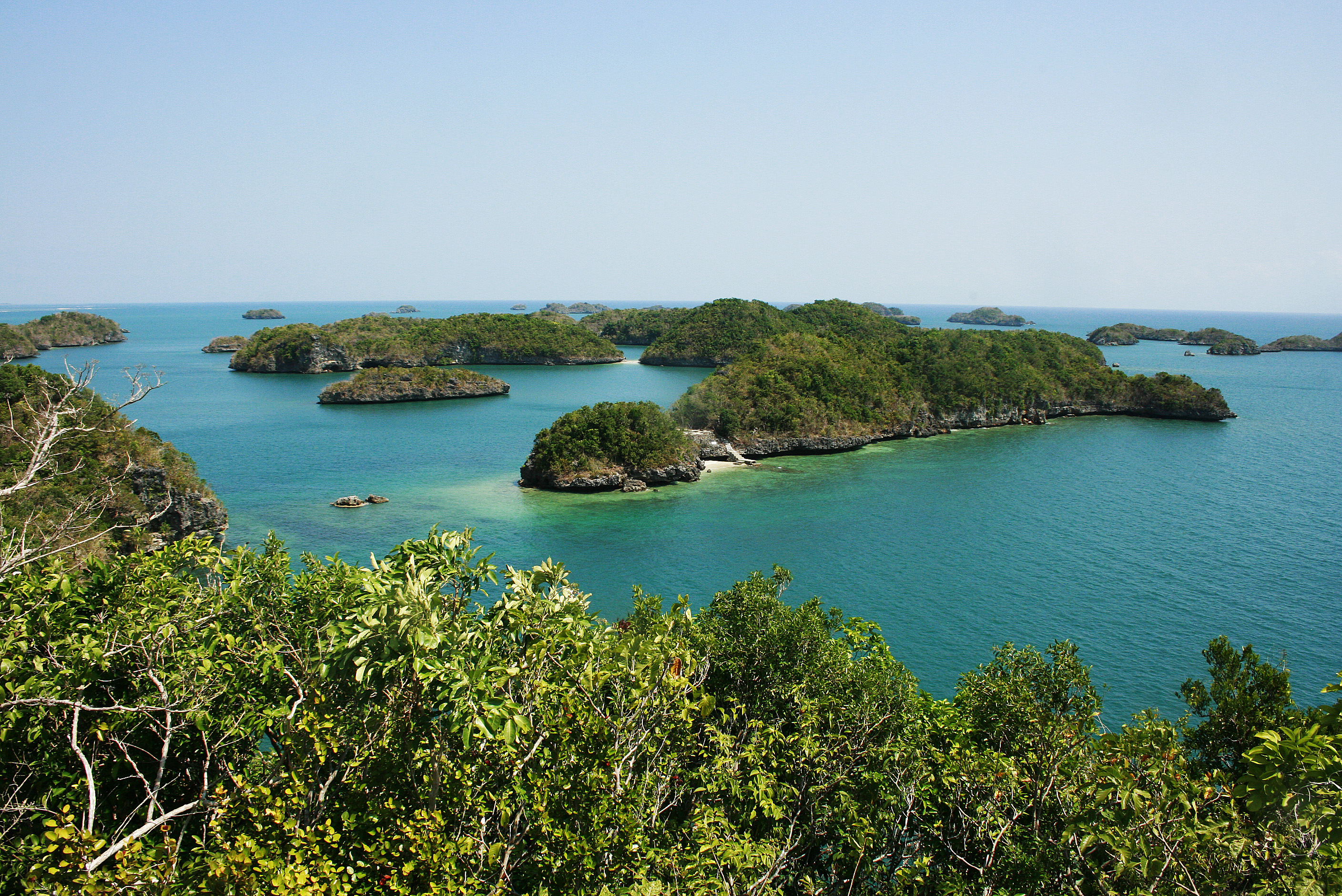
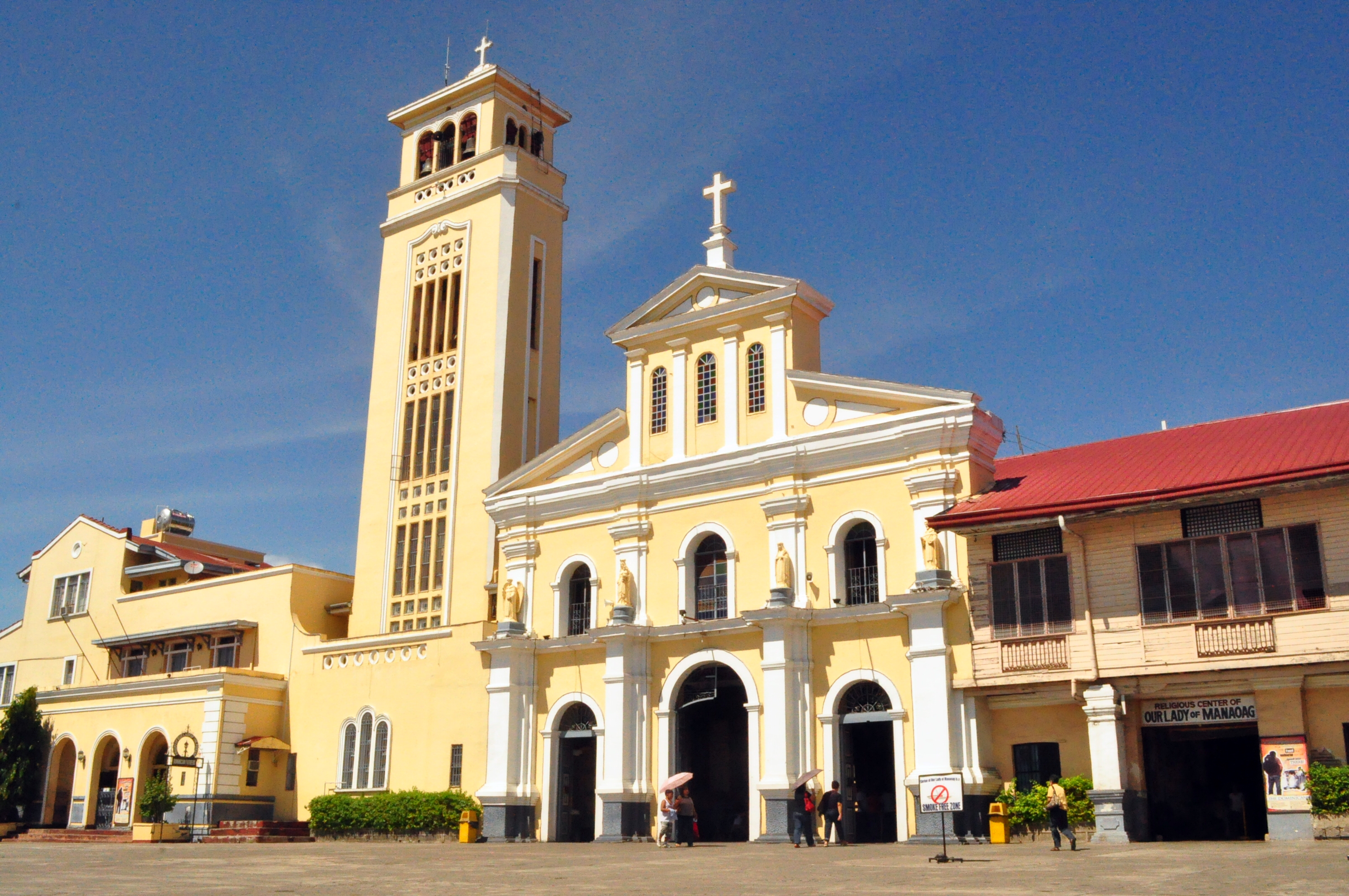
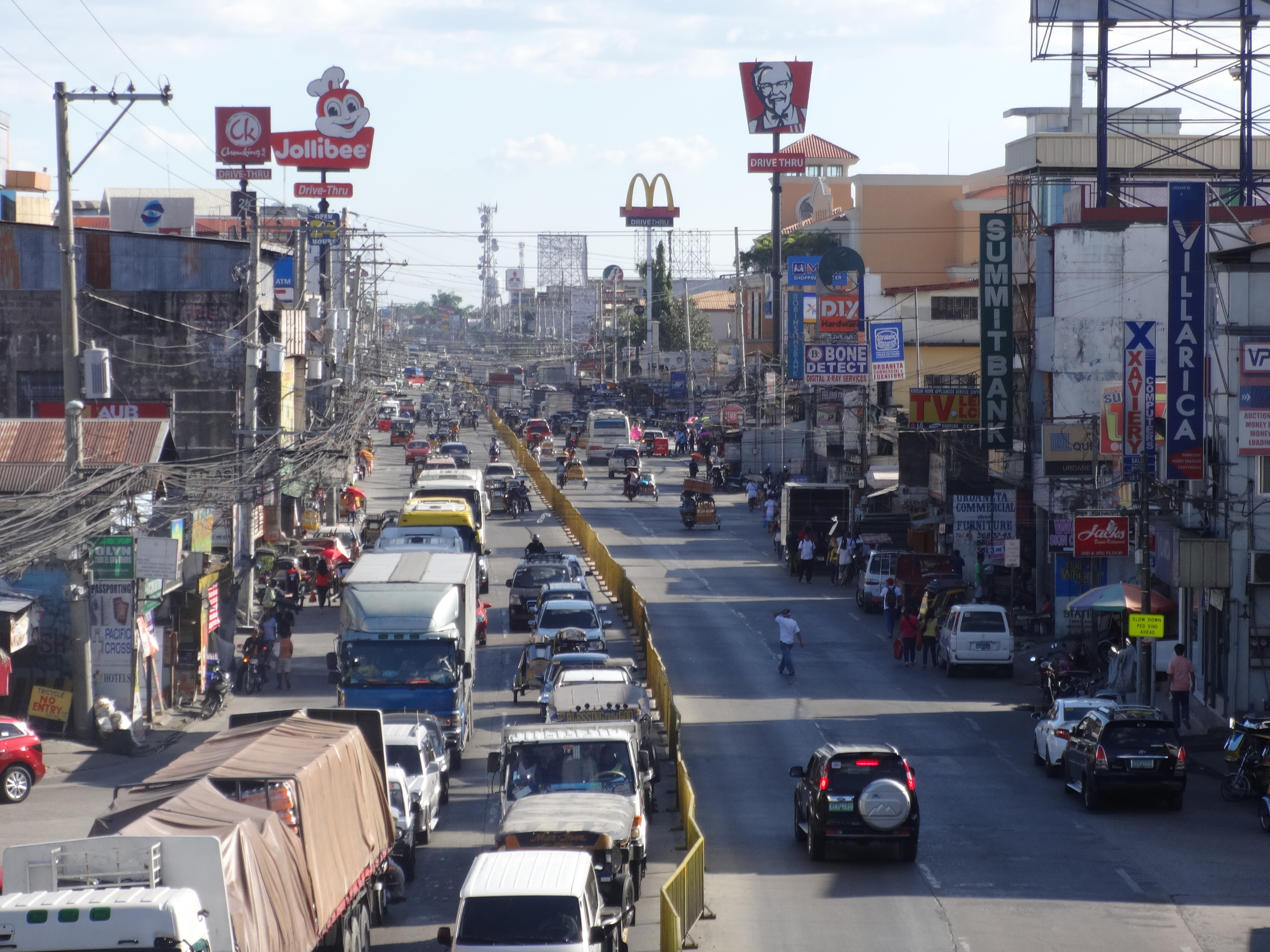
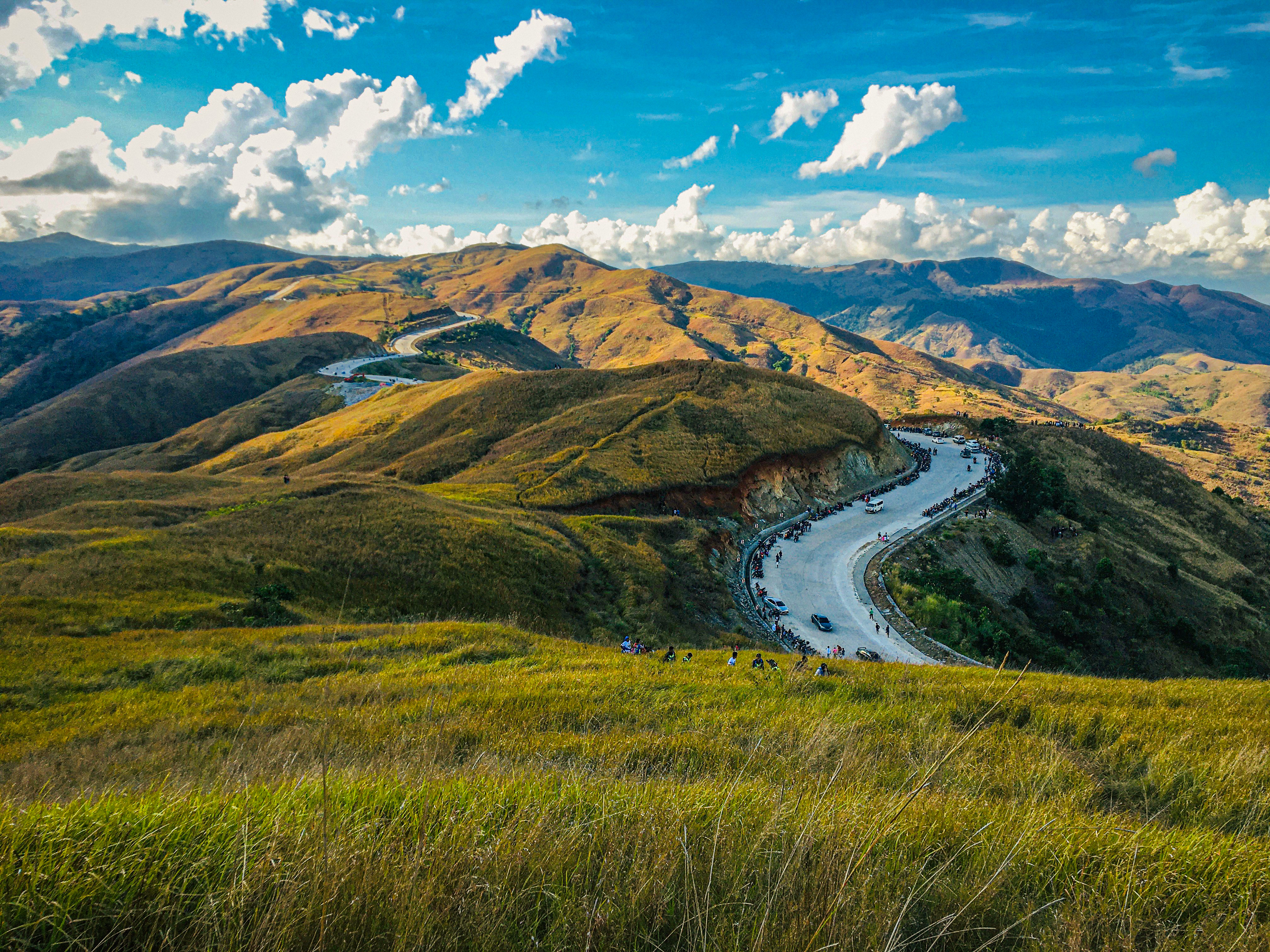
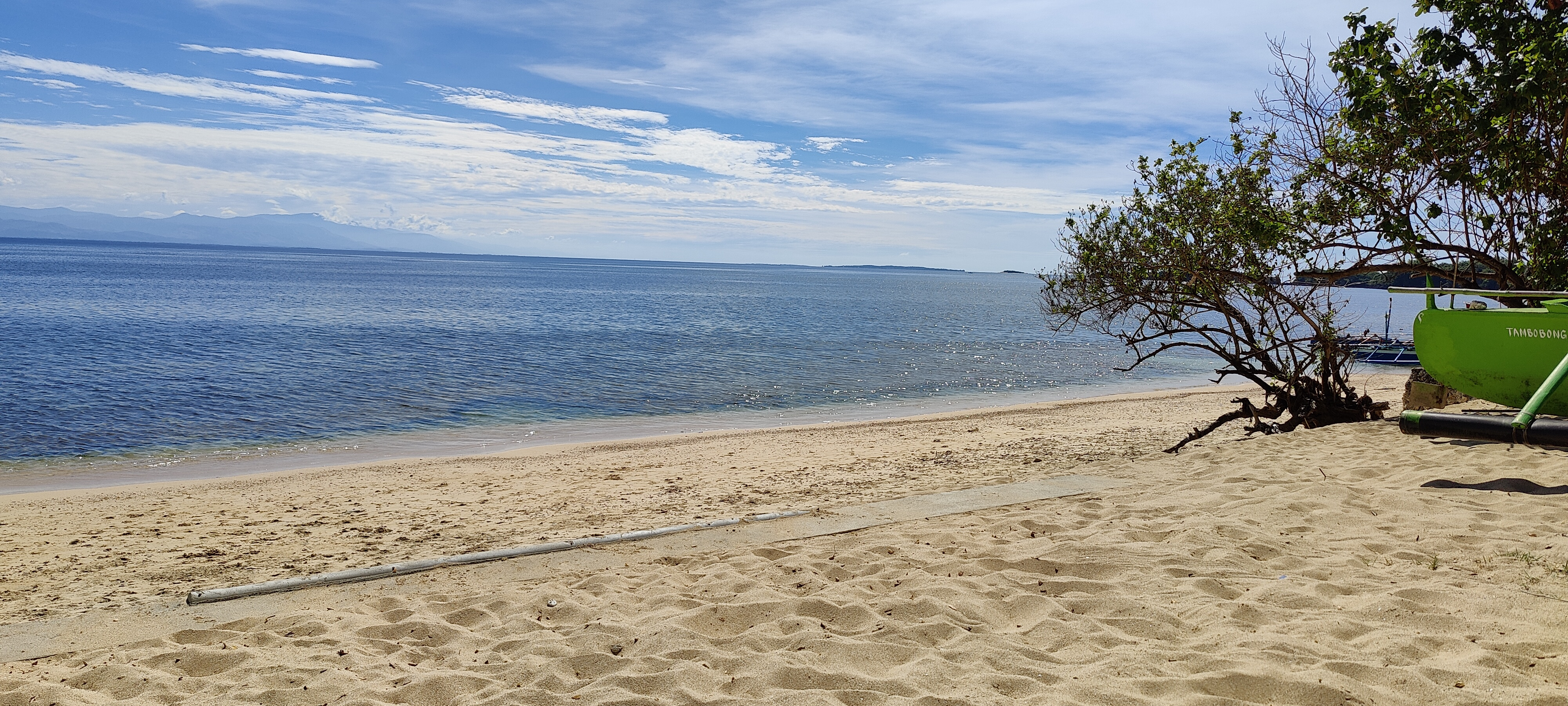
- Clockwise from the top: Pangasinan Provincial Capitol, Minor Basilica of Our Lady of Manaoag, Daang Kalikasan Highway in Mangatarem, Dagupan Cathedral, Tambobong Beach in Dasol, Central Business Area of Urdaneta, and the Hundred Islands National Park in Alaminos.

- Flag Seal
- Etymology: Pang-asin-an, lit. "Place where salt is made"
- Nicknames: Land of Miracles and Romance; Salt Capital of the Philippines
- Anthem: Luyag Ko Tan Yaman (Pangasinan My Treasure)
- Location in the Philippines
- Interactive map of Pangasinan
- Coordinates: 15°55′N 120°20′E
- Country: Philippines
- Region: Ilocos Region
- Founded: April 5, 1580
- Capital: Lingayen
- Largest city: San Carlos

Government
  - Type: Sangguniang Panlalawigan
  - Governor: Ramon V. Guico III (NP)
  - Vice Governor: Mark Ronald D. Lambino (Lakas–CMD)
  - Legislature: Pangasinan Provincial Board
  - Electorate: 2,156,306 voters (2025)

Area
  - Total: 5,451.01 km^{2} (2,104.65 sq mi)
  - Rank: 15th out of 82
- Highest elevation (Mount San Isidro): 737 m (2,418 ft)

Population (2024 census)
  - Total: 3,188,540
  - Rank: 6th out of 82
  - Density: 584.945/km^{2} (1,515.00/sq mi)
  - Rank: 11th out of 82
  - Households: 776,202
- including independent cities
- Demonyms: Pangasinense; Pangasinan

Divisions
  - Independent city: 1: Dagupan**
  - Component cities: 3: Alaminos; San Carlos; Urdaneta
  - Municipalities: 44: Agno; Aguilar; Alcala; Anda; Asingan; Balungao; Bani; Basista; Bautista; Bayambang; Binalonan; Binmaley; Bolinao; Bugallon; Burgos; Calasiao; Dasol; Infanta; Labrador; Laoac; Lingayen; Mabini; Malasiqui; Manaoag; Mangaldan; Mangatarem; Mapandan; Natividad; Pozorrubio; Rosales; San Fabian; San Jacinto; San Manuel; San Nicolas; San Quintin; Santa Barbara; Santa Maria; Santo Tomas; Sison; Sual; Tayug; Umingan; Urbiztondo; Villasis
  - Barangays: 1,333; including independent cities: 1,364
  - Districts: Legislative districts of Pangasinan (shared with Dagupan)

Economy
  - Income class: 1st provincial income class
  - Poverty incidence: 11.4% (2023)
  - Revenue: ₱ 8,115 million (2024)
  - Assets: ₱ 20,472 million (2024)
  - Expenditure: ₱ 6,958 million (2024)
  - Liabilities: ₱ 4,882 million (2024)
- Time zone: UTC+8 (PST)
- PSGC: 0105500000
- IDD : area code: +63 (0)75
- ISO 3166 code: PH-PAN
- Ethnic groups: Pangasinan (55%); Ilocano (44%); Bolinao (1%)
- Spoken languages: Pangasinan (official); Bolinao; Sambal; Ilocano; Tagalog; English
- Website: pangasinan.gov.ph
- ** Dagupan is an independent-component city.

Pangasinan, officially the Province of Pangasinan (Pangasinan: Luyag/Probinsia na Pangasinan, [paŋɡasiˈnan]; Ilocano: Probinsia ti Pangasinan; Tagalog: Lalawigan ng Pangasinan), is a coastal province in the Philippines located in the Ilocos Region of Luzon. Its capital is Lingayen while San Carlos City is the most populous. Pangasinan is in the western part of Luzon along the Lingayen Gulf and the South China Sea. The province covers a total land area of 5,451.01 square kilometres (2,104.65 sq mi). According to the 2020 census, it has a population of 3,188,540. The official number of registered voters in Pangasinan is 2,156,306. The western portion of the province is part of the homeland of the Sambal people, while the central and eastern portions are the homeland of the Pangasinan people. Due to ethnic migration, the Ilocano people settled in the province.

The name "Pangasinan" refers to the province, its people and the spoken language. Indigenous Pangasinan speakers are estimated to number at least 2 million. The Pangasinan language is official in the province and is one of the officially recognized regional languages in the Philippines. Several ethnic groups enrich the cultural fabric of the province. Almost all of the people are Pangasinans and the rest are descendants of the Bolinao and Ilocano who settled the eastern and western parts of the province. Pangasinan is spoken as a second language by many ethnic minorities in Pangasinan. The minority ethnic groups are the Bolinao-speaking Zambals, and Ilocanos.

Popular tourist attractions in Pangasinan include the Hundred Islands National Park in Alaminos and the white-sand beaches of Bolinao and Dasol. Dagupan is known for its Bangus Festival ("Milkfish Festival"). Pangasinan is also known for its mangoes and ceramic oven-baked Puto Calasiao (native rice cake). Pangasinan occupies a strategic geo-political position in the central plain of Luzon. Pangasinan has been described as the gateway to northern Luzon.

== Etymology ==
The name Pangasinan means "place of salt" or "place of salt-making"; it is derived from the prefix pang-, meaning "for", the root word asin, meaning "salt", and suffix -an, signifying "location". The Spanish form of the province's name, Pangasinán, remains predominant, albeit without diacritics and so does its pronunciation: [paŋɡasiˈnan]. The province is a major producer of salt in the Philippines. Its major products include bagoong ("shrimp-paste") and alamang ("salted-krill").

== History ==
=== Early history ===
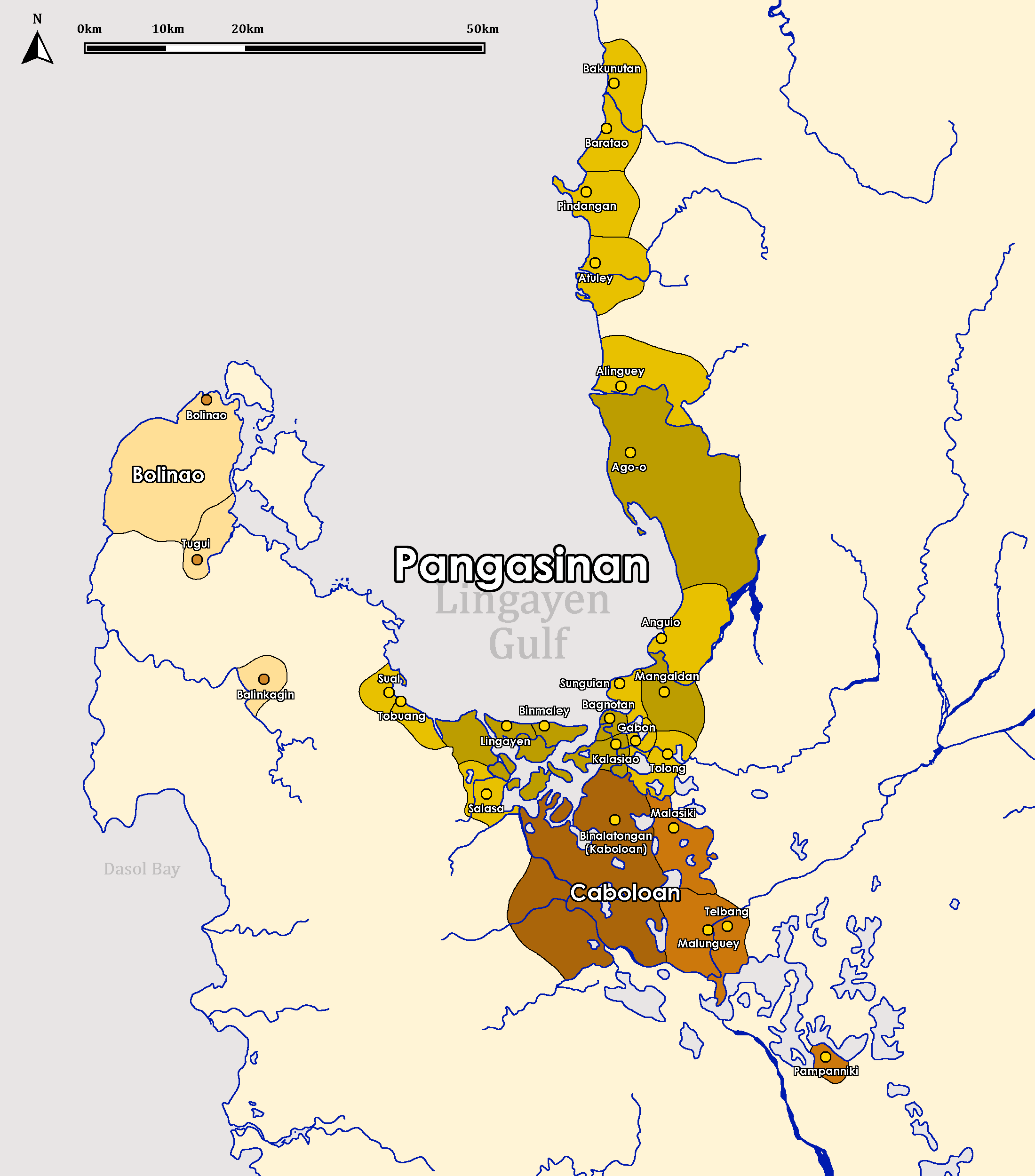
A map of Pangasinan (yellow), Caboloan (brown) and surrounding settlements during the 15th-16th centuries.

Pangasinan, like the rest of the Philippines, was settled by Austronesian peoples by sea during the Austronesian expansion. They established settlements along the Lingayen Gulf and was part of the ancient Austronesian trade routes to India, China, and Japan, since at least the 8th century. The primary industry along the coastal areas was salt-making, which is the origin of the name "Pangasinan" ("place of salt-making"). The interior lands were called "Caboloan" ("place of bolo bamboos"), referring to the abundance of bolo bamboo (Gigantochloa levis).

Pangasinan is identified with "Feng-jia-shi-lan" which appears in Ming Dynasty Chinese records. They are believed to have sent emissaries to China with symbolic "tributes" from 1403 to 1405, which was required to establish trade relations.

In the 16th century, Pangasinan was called the "Port of Japan" by the Spanish. The locals wore native apparel typical of other maritime Southeast Asian ethnic groups in addition to Japanese and Chinese silks. Even common people were clad in Chinese and Japanese cotton garments. They blackened their teeth and were disgusted by the white teeth of foreigners which were likened to that of animals. They used porcelain jars typical of Japanese and Chinese households. Japanese-style gunpowder weapons were encountered in naval battles in the area. In exchange for these goods, traders from all over Asia would come to trade primarily for gold and slaves, but also deerskins, civet and other local products. Other than a notably more extensive trade network with Japan and China they were culturally similar to other Luzon groups to the south.

Pangasinans were also described as a warlike people who were known for their resistance to Spanish conquest. Bishop Domingo Salazar described Pangasinans as the fiercest and cruelest in the land. They were untouched by Christianity but like Christians they used vintage wine in small quantities for sacramental practices. The church bragged that they, not the Spanish military, won the northern part of the Philippines for Spain. The church was strict with adulterers; the punishment was death for both parties. Pangasinans were known to take defeated Sambal, (Aeta) and Negrito warriors to sell as slaves to Chinese traders.

=== Spanish colonial era ===
On April 27, 1565, the Spanish conquistador Miguel López de Legazpi arrived in the Philippine islands with about 500 soldiers and established a Spanish settlement. On May 24, 1570, the Spanish forces defeated Rajah Sulayman and other rulers of Manila and later declared Manila the capital of the Spanish East Indies. After securing Manila, the Spanish forces conquered the rest of the island of Luzon, including Pangasinan.

==== Provincia de Pangasinán ====
In 1571, the Spanish conquest of Pangasinan began with an expedition by the Spanish conquistador Martín de Goiti, who came from the Spanish settlement in Manila through Pampanga. About a year later another Spanish conquistador, Juan de Salcedo, sailed to Lingayen Gulf and landed at the mouth of the Agno River. Limahong, a Chinese pirate, fled to Pangasinan after his fleet was driven away from Manila in 1574. Limahong failed to establish a colony in Pangasinan, as an army led by de Salcedo chased him out of Pangasinan after a seven-month siege.

What is known today as the Province of Pangasinan dates back to an administrative and judicial district as early as 1580. Its capital was Lingayen, but its territorial boundaries were first delineated in 1611. Lingayen has remained the capital of the province except for a brief period during the revolutionary era when San Carlos City served as temporary administrative headquarters and during the slightly longer Japanese occupation, when Dagupan was the capital.

The province of Pangasinan was formerly classified as an alcaldía mayor de término or first-class civil province during the Spanish regime. Its territorial jurisdiction once included most of the province of Zambales and portions of what are now the Provinces of Tarlac and La Union. By the end of the 1700s, Pangasinan had 19,836 native families and 719 Spanish Filipino families.

=== Rebellion against the Spanish rule ===
==== Malong liberation ====
Andres Malong, a native chief of the town of Binalatongan (now named San Carlos City), liberated the province from Spanish rule in December 1660. The people of Pangasinan proclaimed Andres Malong Ari na Pangasinan ("King of Pangasinan"). Pangasinan armies attempted to liberate the neighboring provinces of Pampanga and Ilocos, but were repelled by a Spanish-led coalition of loyalist tribal warriors and mercenaries. In February 1661, the newly independent Kingdom of Pangasinan fell to the Captaincy General of the Philippines.

==== Palaris Liberation ====
On November 3, 1762, the people of Pangasinan proclaimed independence from Spain after a rebellion led by Juan de la Cruz Palaris. The Pangasinan Revolt was sparked by news that Manila had fallen to the British on October 6, 1762. The Traité de Paris ended the Seven Years' War among Britain, France, and Spain on March 1, 1763. On January 16, 1765, Juan de la Cruz Palaris was captured and Pangasinan was again subjugated by the Spanish.

=== Philippine Revolution ===
The Katipunan, a nationalist secret society, was founded on July 7, 1892, with the aim of uniting the peoples of the Philippines in the fight for independence and religious freedom. The Philippine Revolution began on August 23, 1896, and was led by the Supremo, Andrés Bonifacio. On November 18, 1897, a Katipunan council was formed in Western Pangasinan with Presidente Generalisimo Roman Manalang and General Mauro Ortiz.

Andres Urdaneta monument, in front of the City Hall.

General Emilio Aguinaldo proclaimed Philippine independence on June 12, 1898. Dagupan, the major commercial center of Pangasinan, was surrounded by Katipunan forces on July 18, 1898. The Battle of Dagupan lasted from July 18 to 23 of that year with the surrender of 1,500 Spanish soldiers under Commander Federico J. Ceballos and Governor Joaquin de Orengochea. It was fought by local Katipuneros under the command of General Francisco Makabulos and the last remnants of the once mighty Spanish Army under General Ceballos. Three local heroes fought in the five-day battle, Don Daniel Maramba of Santa Barbara, Don Vicente Prado of San Jacinto and Don Juan Quezada of Dagupan. Their armies amassed in Dagupan making a last stand at the brick-walled Catholic Church.

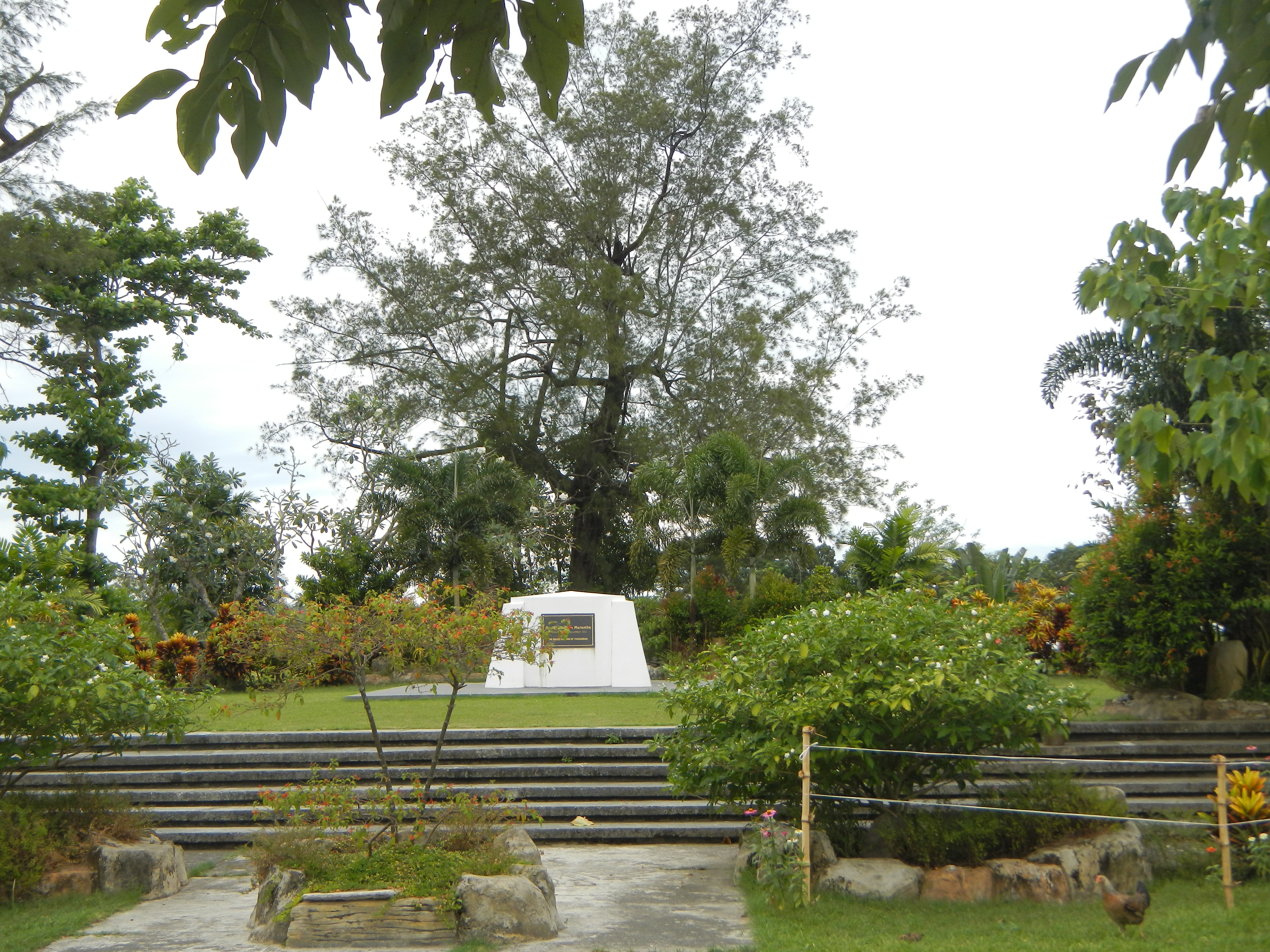
Grave of Don Daniel B. Maramba (Santa Barbara)

Maramba led the liberation of the town of Santa Barbara on March 7, 1898, following a signal for simultaneous attack from Makabulos. Hearing that Santa Barbara fell to rebel forces, the Spanish in Dagupan attempted to retake the town but were repelled by Maramba's forces. After the setback, the Spanish decided to concentrate their forces in Lingayen in order to protect the provincial capital. This allowed Maramba to expand his operations to include Malasiqui, Urdaneta and Mapandan which he defeated in succession. He then defeated the town of Mangaldan before proceeding to the last Spanish garrison in Dagupan. On March 7, 1898, rebels under the command of Prado and Quesada attacked convents in the province of Zambales which now constitute western Pangasinan.

Attacked and brought under Filipino control were Alaminos, Agno, Anda, Alos, Bani, Balincaguin, Bolinao, Dasol, Eguia and Potot. The revolt then spread to Labrador, Sual, Salasa and many other towns in the west. The towns of Sual, Labrador, Lingayen, Salasa and Bayambang were occupied first by the forces of Prado and Quesada before they attacked Dagupan.

On April 17, 1898, General Makabulos appointed Prado as Politico-Military Governor of Pangasinan, with Quesada as his second-in-command. In May 1898, General Emilio Aguinaldo returned from his exile in Hong Kong following the signing of the Pact of Biac-na-Bato in December 1897. Aguinaldo's return renewed the flames of the revolution. On June 3, 1898, General Makabulos entered Tarlac.

So successful were the Katipunan in their many pitched battles against Spanish forces that on June 30, 1898, Spanish authorities decided to evacuate all forces to Dagupan for a last stand against the rebels. All civilian and military personnel, including volunteers from towns not yet in rebel hands, were ordered to go to Dagupan. Those who heeded this order were the volunteer forces of Mangaldan, San Jacinto, Pozorrubio, Manaoag, and Villasis. Among the items brought to Dagupan was the image of the Most Holy Rosary of the Virgin of Manaoag, the patroness of Pangasinan.

The siege began when the forces of Maramba and Prado converged in Dagupan on July 18, 1898. The arrival of General Makabulos strengthened the rebel forces until the Spanish, holed up inside the Catholic Church, surrendered five days later. The poorly armed Filipino rebels were no match for the Spanish and loyal Filipino soldiers holed inside the Church. The tempo of battle changed when the attackers under the command of Don Vicente Prado devised a crude means of protection to shield them from Spanish fire while advancing. They used trunks of bananas bundled up in sawali which enabled them to move towards the Church.

=== American Colonial Era ===
In 1901, towns of Nueva Ecija, Balungao, Rosales, San Quintin and Umingan were annexed to the province of Pangasinan, because they were further away from the capital and already considered pacified by US forces.

On November 30, 1903, several municipalities from northern Zambales including Agno, Alaminos, Anda, Bani, Bolinao, Burgos, Dasol, Infanta and Mabini were ceded to Pangasinan by the American colonial government for historical basis.

Pangasinan and other parts of the Spanish East Indies were ceded to the Americans after the Treaty of Paris, which ended the Spanish–American War. During the Philippine–American War Lieutenant Col. José Torres Bugallón of Salasa fought together with Gen. Antonio Luna to defend the First Philippine Republic against American colonization in Northern Luzon. Bugallon was killed in battle on February 5, 1899. The First Philippine Republic was abolished in 1901. In 1907 the Philippine Assembly was established and for the first time five residents of Pangasinan were elected as its district representatives.

In 1921, Mauro Navarro, representing Pangasinan in the Philippine Assembly, sponsored a law to rename the town of Salasa to Bugallon in honor of General Bugallon.

Manuel L. Quezon was inaugurated as the first president of the Commonwealth of the Philippines with collaboration from the United States of America on November 15, 1935.

The 21st Infantry Division were stationed in Pangasinan during the pre-World War II era. Anti-Japanese Imperial military operations included the fall of Bataan and Corregidor along with aiding the USAFFE ground force from January to May 1942 and the Japanese Insurgencies and Allied Liberation in Pangasinan from 1942 to 1945.

=== Postwar era ===
After the declaration of Independence on July 4, 1946, Eugenio Perez, a Liberal Party congressman representing the fourth district of Pangasinan, was elected Speaker of the lower Legislative House. He led the House until 1953 when the Nacionalista Party became the dominant party.

=== Martial law era ===
Pangasinan, which is historically and geographically part of the Central Luzon Region, was made politically part of the Ilocos Region (Region I) by the gerrymandering of Ferdinand Marcos, even though Pangasinan has a distinct language and culture, Pangasinan. The political classification of Pangasinan as part of the Ilocos Region generated confusion among some Filipinos. The residents of Pangasinan are Ilocanos, even though Ilocanos constitute a minority in the province. Its economy is larger than the Ilocano provinces of Ilocos Norte, Ilocos Sur and La Union and its population is more than 50 percent of the population of Region 1.

The Philippine economy took a turn for the worse in the late 1960s and early 1970s, with the 1969 Philippine balance of payments crisis being one of the early landmark events. Economic analysts generally attribute this to the ramp-up on loan-funded government spending to promote Ferdinand Marcos’ 1969 reelection campaign. Many students from Pangasinan were part of the protests that began in 1970 and continued through 1971 and early 1972, calling for government and economic reforms. In September 1972, one year before the expected end of his last constitutionally allowed term as president in 1973, Ferdinand Marcos finally placed the Philippines under Martial Law - an act which allowed him to remain in power for fourteen more years, during which Pangasinan went through many social and economic ups and downs.

The human rights abuses, crony capitalism, propagandistic construction projects, and personal expensive lifestyles of the Marcos Family prompted opposition from various Filipino citizens despite the risks of arrest and torture. The Pangasinan Philippine Constabulary (PC) Provincial Camp in Lingayen (renamed Camp Antonio Sison in 2017) was so full of political prisoners that its chapel, which measured a mere 4x9 meters, was divided in two by a wall of bars, with one part used as a jail. Among the most prominent human rights violations victims of the regime were student leader Eduardo Aquino who was from Mapandan, Pangasinan and beauty queen turned activist Maita Gomez of Bautista, Pangasinan. Aquino was ambushed by soldiers during a meeting of activists in Tarlac, while Gomez was jailed numerous times but survived to be co-founder of women's rights group GABRIELA. Both were eventually recognized by having their names posthumously inscribed on the Wall of Remembrance of the Philippines' Bantayog ng mga Bayani, which honors the martyrs and heroes who fought the dictatorship.

Pangasinan Philippine Constabulary Provincial Camp

Camp Antonio Sison, formerly known as the Pangasinan Philippine Constabulary Provincial Camp, is the headquarters of the Philippine National Police (PNP) in Pangasinan, located within the provincial capitol complex in Lingayen, Pangasinan, Philippines.

During the martial law era under President Ferdinand Marcos Sr., the facility operated as a Philippine Constabulary (PC) provincial camp and functioned as a holding facility for arrested activists and suspected dissidents prior to their transfer to larger regional military camps, such as Camp Servillano Aquino in Tarlac.

Overcrowding and Life Inside The Jail

During the early years of martial law, the number of political arrests in Pangasinan exceeded the capacity of standard detention cells at the Lingayen PC camp, resulting in detainees being confined inside the camp's chapel.

Baguio-based journalist and Kabataang Makabayan activist Kathleen Okubo documented her detention at the facility following her arrest in Pangasinan.

According to Okubo, the detention space consisted of a four-by-nine-meter (4×9m) chapel partitioned down the middle by a wall of iron bars so that half of the structure could serve as an overflow jail. Okubo and fellow detainees were held inside the partitioned chapel for roughly a week before most were transported to Camp Servillano Aquino in Tarlac.

Arrests, Interrogations, and Military Control

Counterinsurgency operations in Pangasinan during the martial law period included warrantless dawn raids, the seizure of printed materials, and the detention of activists in both official constabulary camps and clandestine safe houses.

In 1972, two 6×6 military trucks carrying armed Philippine Constabulary personnel conducted a dawn raid on a house in Pangasinan where Okubo and fellow Kabataang Makabayan (KM) were staying. Soldiers conducted the raid without presenting an arrest warrant or informing the occupants of their rights, confiscating all books and papers on the premises, including a Gideons Bible that soldiers mistook for Mao Zedong's Little Red Book. After a group of local newspapermen (journalist) from Pangasinan Courier and Sunday Punch who visited the camp to negotiate their release, the detainees were loaded onto a 30-seater military bus escorted by armed troopers and transported to the Lingayen PC camp.

=== During and after the People Power revolution ===
In February 1986, both the COMELEC and the NAMFREL counts showed that Corazon Aquino had won the city of Dagupan (in the north along with the provinces of Benguet and Mountain Province) during the 1986 Philippine presidential election, despite widely acknowledged election fraud meant to assure a victory for Ferdinand Marcos. Weeks later, Vice Chief of Staff General Fidel V. Ramos, a Pangasinense who was head of the Philippine Integrated National Police, became an instrumental figure in the EDSA people power revolution which removed Ferdinand Marcos and compelled him to flee the country.

After the downfall of Marcos all local government unit executives were ordered by President Corazon Aquino to vacate their posts. Some local executives were ordered to return to their seats, as in the case of Mayor Ludovico Espinosa of Dasol, who claimed to have joined UNIDO during the height of the EDSA Revolution. Fidel Ramos was appointed as AFP Chief of Staff and later as Defense Secretary replacing Juan Ponce Enrile. Oscar Orbos, a congressman from Bani, was appointed by Aquino to head the Department of Transportation and Communications and later to Executive Secretary.

On May 11, 1992, Fidel V. Ramos ran for President. He became the first Pangasinense President of the Philippines. Under his leadership, the Philippines recovered from the oil and power crisis of 1991. His influence sparked the economic growth of Pangasinan when it hosted the 1995 Palarong Pambansa (Philippine National Games).

Jose de Venecia, who represented the same district as Eugenio Perez (his former father-in-law), was the second Pangasinense to become Speaker of the House of Representatives in 1992. He was reelected again in 1995. De Venecia was selected by the Ramos' administration party Lakas NUCD to be its presidential candidate in 1998. De Venecia ran but lost to Vice President Joseph Estrada. Oscar Orbos ran for vice president but lost to Senator Gloria Macapagal Arroyo, whose mother, former First Lady Evangelina Macaraeg-Macapagal, hails from Binalonan.

Arroyo ascended to the presidency after the second EDSA Revolution when President Joseph Estrada was overthrown.

=== Contemporary ===
In May 2004, actor-turned-politician Fernando Poe, Jr. of San Carlos ran for president against incumbent Gloria Macapagal Arroyo. The Pangasinan vote was split by the two presidential candidates, both with Pangasinan roots. Arroyo was elected President, but her victory was marred by charges of electoral fraud and vote-buying.

== Geography ==
=== Physical ===
Pangasinan is located in the west central area of Luzon in the Philippines. It is bordered by La Union to the north, Benguet and Nueva Vizcaya to the northeast, Nueva Ecija to the southeast, and Zambales and Tarlac to the south. To the west of Pangasinan is the West Philippine Sea. The province also encloses Lingayen Gulf.

The province has a land area of 5,451.01 square kilometres (2,104.65 sq mi). It is 170 kilometres (110 mi) north of Manila, 50 kilometres (31 mi) south of Baguio, 115 kilometres (71 mi) north of Subic International Airport and Seaport, and 80 square kilometres (31 sq mi) north of Clark International Airport. At the coast of Alaminos, the Hundred islands have become a famous tourist spot.

The terrain of the province, as part of the Central Luzon plains, is typically flat, with a few parts being hilly and/or mountainous. The northeastern municipalities of San Manuel, San Nicolas, Natividad, San Quintin and Umingan have hilly to mountainous areas at the tip of the Cordillera mountains. The Zambales mountains extend to the province's western towns of Labrador, Mabini, Bugallon, Aguilar, Mangatarem, Dasol, and Infanta forming the mountainous portions of those towns.

The Philippine Institute of Volcanology and Seismology (PHIVOLCS) reported several inactive volcanoes in the province: Amorong, Balungao, Cabaluyan, Cahelietan, Candong, and Malabobo. PHIVOLCS reported no active or potentially active volcanoes in Pangasinan. A caldera-like landform is located between the towns of Malasiqui and Villasis with a center at about 15° 55′ N and 120° 30′ E near the Cabaruan Hills.

Several rivers traverse the province. The longest is the Agno River which originates in the Cordillera Mountains of Benguet and eventually terminates at Lingayen Gulf. Other major rivers include the Bued River, Angalacan River, Sinocalan River, Pantal River, Patalan River and the Cayanga River.

=== Administrative divisions ===
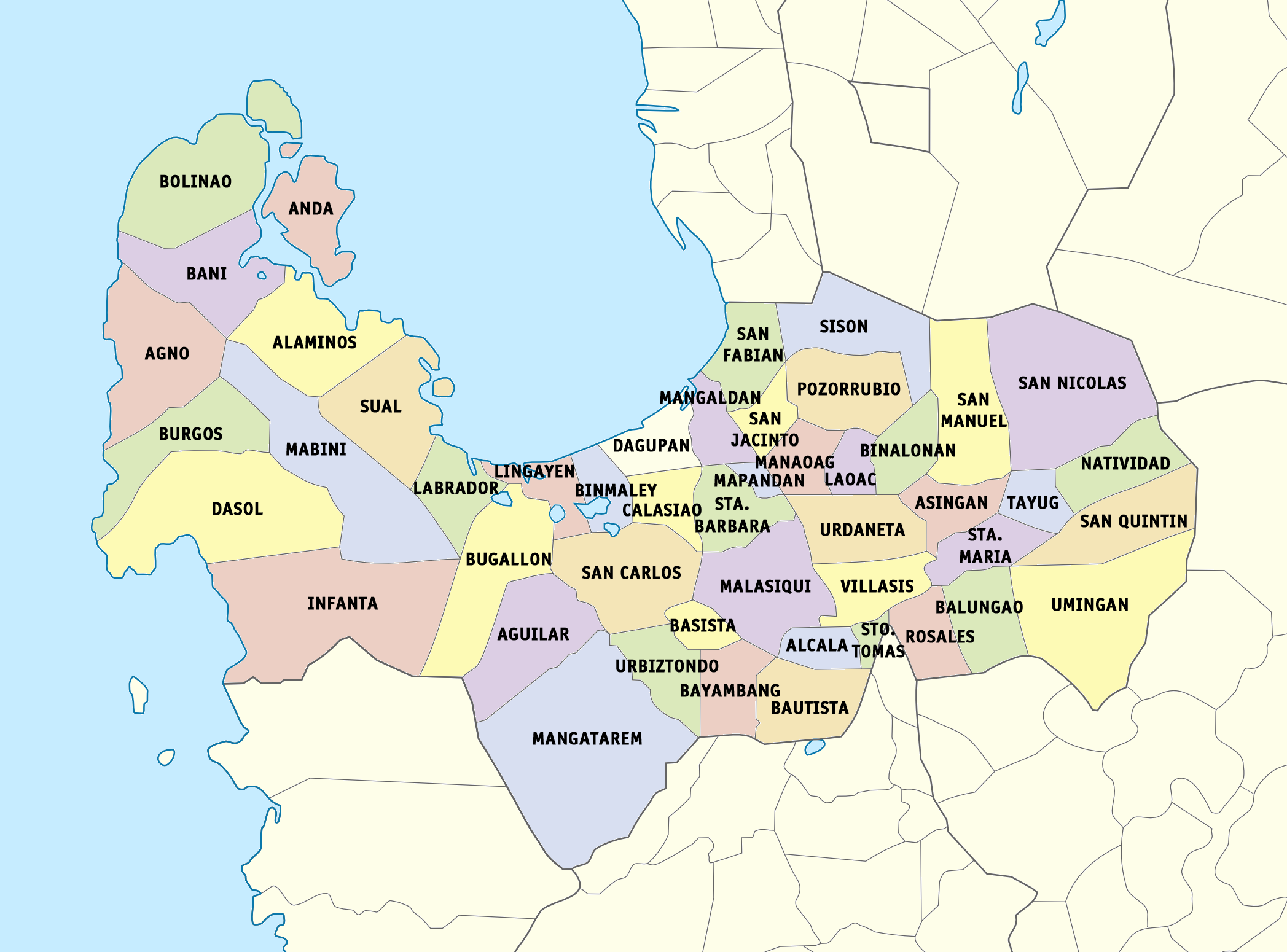
Political map of Pangasinan

The province of Pangasinan is subdivided into 44 municipalities, 4 cities, and 1,364 barangays (which means "village" or "community"). There are six congressional districts in the province.

The capital of the province is Lingayen. In ancient times, the capital of Pangasinan was Binalatongan, now San Carlos. During Japanese occupation, Dagupan was made a wartime capital.

- † Provincial capital
- ^ Independent component city
- ∗ Component city
- Municipality
- ∞ Largest settlement

City or municipality		District	Population			±% p.a.	Area		Density		Barangay	Coordinates^{[A]}
			(2024)		(2020)		km^{2}	sq mi	/km^{2}	/sq mi		
Agno		1st	0.9%	29,270	29,947	−0.57%	169.75	65.54	172	447	17	16°06′51″N 119°48′10″E
Aguilar		2nd	1.4%	45,363	45,100	0.15%	195.07	75.32	233	602	16	15°53′19″N 120°14′22″E
Alaminos^{[1]}	∗	1st	3.1%	100,430	99,397	0.26%	164.26	63.42	611	1,584	39	16°09′23″N 119°58′49″E
Alcala		5th	1.6%	49,479	48,908	0.29%	45.71	17.65	1,082	2,804	21	15°50′39″N 120°31′17″E
Anda		1st	1.3%	42,688	41,548	0.68%	74.55	28.78	573	1,483	18	16°17′24″N 119°57′05″E
Asingan		6th	1.8%	58,349	57,811	0.23%	66.64	25.73	876	2,268	21	16°00′13″N 120°40′13″E
Balungao		6th	1.0%	30,678	30,004	0.56%	73.25	28.28	419	1,085	20	15°53′54″N 120°40′21″E
Bani		1st	1.7%	52,715	52,603	0.05%	179.65	69.36	293	760	27	16°11′00″N 119°51′45″E
Basista		2nd	1.2%	37,840	37,679	0.11%	24.00	9.27	1,577	4,084	13	15°51′08″N 120°24′09″E
Bautista		5th	1.1%	35,728	35,398	0.23%	46.33	17.89	771	1,997	18	15°48′40″N 120°28′36″E
Bayambang		3rd	4.1%	129,506	129,011	0.10%	143.94	55.58	900	2,330	77	15°48′32″N 120°27′14″E
Binalonan		5th	1.8%	56,560	56,382	0.08%	58.05	22.41	974	2,524	24	16°02′40″N 120°35′30″E
Binmaley		2nd	2.8%	88,006	86,881	0.32%	118.50	45.75	743	1,923	33	16°01′50″N 120°16′10″E
Bolinao		1st	2.7%	84,658	83,979	0.20%	197.22	76.15	429	1,112	30	16°23′08″N 119°53′40″E
Bugallon		2nd	2.4%	76,027	74,962	0.35%	189.64	73.22	401	1,038	24	15°57′14″N 120°12′54″E
Burgos		1st	0.7%	23,240	23,749	−0.54%	131.32	50.70	177	458	14	16°03′33″N 119°51′54″E
Calasiao		3rd	3.2%	100,686	100,471	0.05%	48.36	18.67	2,082	5,392	24	16°00′32″N 120°21′26″E
Dagupan^{[2]}	^	4th	5.5%	174,777	174,302	0.07%	37.23	14.37	4,695	12,159	31	16°02′33″N 120°20′15″E
Dasol		1st	1.0%	31,842	31,355	0.39%	166.60	64.32	191	495	18	15°59′25″N 119°52′52″E
Infanta		1st	0.8%	26,837	26,242	0.56%	254.29	98.18	106	273	13	15°49′30″N 119°54′20″E
Labrador		2nd	0.8%	26,995	26,811	0.17%	90.99	35.13	297	768	10	16°01′32″N 120°08′43″E
Laoac		5th	1.1%	34,550	34,128	0.31%	40.50	15.64	853	2,209	22	16°02′53″N 120°32′50″E
Lingayen †		2nd	3.4%	108,510	107,728	0.18%	62.76	24.23	1,729	4,478	32	16°01′14″N 120°13′50″E
Mabini		1st	0.8%	26,589	26,454	0.13%	291.01	112.36	91	237	16	16°04′11″N 119°56′22″E
Malasiqui		3rd	4.5%	144,344	143,094	0.22%	131.37	50.72	1,099	2,846	73	15°55′09″N 120°24′50″E
Manaoag		4th	2.4%	76,606	76,045	0.18%	55.95	21.60	1,369	3,546	26	16°02′34″N 120°29′15″E
Mangaldan		4th	3.6%	113,302	113,185	0.03%	48.17	18.60	2,352	6,092	30	16°04′00″N 120°24′04″E
Mangatarem		2nd	2.5%	79,648	79,323	0.10%	317.50	122.59	251	650	82	15°47′19″N 120°17′38″E
Mapandan		3rd	1.2%	38,228	38,058	0.11%	21.01	8.11	1,820	4,713	15	16°01′26″N 120°27′13″E
Natividad		6th	0.8%	26,721	25,771	0.91%	134.36	51.88	199	515	18	16°02′34″N 120°47′41″E
Pozorrubio		5th	2.4%	75,143	74,729	0.14%	134.60	51.97	558	1,446	34	16°06′37″N 120°32′45″E
Rosales		6th	2.1%	67,510	66,711	0.30%	66.39	25.63	1,017	2,634	37	15°53′29″N 120°37′59″E
San Carlos^{[3]}	∗∞	3rd	6.5%	208,330	205,424	0.35%	169.03	65.26	1,233	3,192	86	15°55′40″N 120°20′52″E
San Fabian		4th	2.8%	87,714	87,428	0.08%	81.28	31.38	1,079	2,795	34	16°07′35″N 120°24′12″E
San Jacinto		4th	1.4%	44,713	44,351	0.20%	44.18	17.06	1,012	2,621	19	16°04′25″N 120°26′13″E
San Manuel		6th	1.8%	56,876	54,271	1.18%	129.18	49.88	440	1,140	14	16°03′51″N 120°40′05″E
San Nicolas		6th	1.3%	40,144	39,778	0.23%	210.20	81.16	191	495	33	16°04′13″N 120°45′45″E
San Quintin		6th	1.1%	34,322	33,980	0.25%	115.90	44.75	296	767	21	15°59′03″N 120°48′47″E
Santa Barbara		3rd	2.9%	92,420	92,187	0.06%	61.37	23.70	1,506	3,900	29	16°00′00″N 120°24′18″E
Santa Maria		6th	1.1%	34,452	34,220	0.17%	69.50	26.83	496	1,284	23	15°58′45″N 120°42′01″E
Santo Tomas		6th	0.5%	14,894	14,878	0.03%	13.43	5.19	1,109	2,872	10	15°52′42″N 120°35′10″E
Sison		5th	1.6%	51,439	52,320	−0.42%	81.88	31.61	628	1,627	28	16°10′21″N 120°30′37″E
Sual		1st	1.2%	38,625	39,091	−0.30%	130.16	50.26	297	769	19	16°04′00″N 120°05′42″E
Tayug		6th	1.4%	45,476	45,241	0.13%	51.24	19.78	888	2,299	21	16°01′40″N 120°44′41″E
Umingan		6th	2.5%	78,940	77,074	0.60%	258.43	99.78	305	791	58	15°55′36″N 120°50′26″E
Urbiztondo		2nd	1.8%	56,349	55,557	0.35%	81.80	31.58	689	1,784	21	15°49′24″N 120°19′46″E
Urdaneta^{[4]}	∗	5th	4.6%	145,935	144,577	0.23%	98.21	37.92	1,486	3,849	34	15°58′31″N 120°34′01″E
Villasis		5th	2.0%	65,086	65,047	0.01%	75.83	29.28	858	2,223	21	15°54′05″N 120°35′18″E
Total^{[B]}				3,188,540	3,163,190	0.20%	5,450.59	2,104.48	585	3,924	1,364	(see GeoGroup box)
1. Coordinates mark the city/town center, and are sortable by latitude.; 2. Total figures include the independent component city of Dagupan.; ^{1} Became a component city on March 28, 2001, under Republic Act 9025.; ^{2} Became an independent component city on June 20, 1947, under Republic Act 170.; ^{3} Became an component city on January 1, 1966, under Republic Act 4487.; ^{4} Became an component city on March 21, 1998, under Republic Act 8480.

=== Barangays ===
Pangasinan has 1,364 barangays comprising its 44 municipalities and 4 cities, ranking the province at 3rd with the most barangays in a Philippine province, only behind the Visayan provinces of Leyte and Iloilo.

Longos Amangonan Parac‑Parac Fabrica is the longest named barangay in the Philippines, it is situated in the municipality of San Fabian, Pangasinan. The most populous barangay in the province is Bonuan Gueset in Dagupan with a population of 22,042 as of 2010. If cities are excluded, Poblacion in the municipality of Lingayen has the highest population at 12,642. Iton in Bayambang has the lowest with only 99 as of the 2010 census.

=== Historical towns ===
These list includes the historical towns that that were once used to be in the province before they are ceded to nearby provinces:

- Rosario
- Pugo
- Tubao
- Santo Tomas
- Agoo
- Aringay
- Caba
- San Clemente
- Camiling
- Moncada (former barrio of Paniqui)
- Paniqui
- San Manuel
- Anao
- Ramos
- Pura
- Gerona (Paontalon)
- Santa Ignacia (Binaca)
- Mayantoc (former barrio of Camiling)

== Demographics ==
=== Population ===
Population census of Pangasinan

Year	Pop.	±% p.a.
1903	442,521	—
1918	565,922	+1.65%
1939	742,475	+1.30%
1948	920,491	+2.42%
1960	1,124,144	+1.68%
1970	1,386,143	+2.11%
1975	1,520,085	+1.87%
1980	1,636,057	+1.48%

Year	Pop.	±% p.a.
1990	2,022,056	+2.14%
1995	2,178,412	+1.41%
2000	2,434,086	+2.41%
2007	2,645,395	+1.15%
2010	2,779,862	+1.82%
2015	2,956,726	+1.18%
2020	3,163,190	+1.43%
2024	3,188,540	+0.19%

Source: Philippine Statistics Authority

The population of Pangasinan in the 2020 census was 3,163,190 people, with a density of 580 inhabitants per square kilometre or 1,500 inhabitants per square mile.

Population by ethnicity (2020)
Ethnicity	Population
Pangasinense	1,557,356 (49.3%)
Ilocano	1,258,746 (39.84%)
Tagalog	177,357 (5.61%)
Bisaya	43,248 (1.37%)
Bicol	18,730 (0.59%)
Other Local Ethnicity	12,245 (0.39%)
Ilonggo	10,068 (0.32%)
Bago	9,907 (0.31%)
Others	71,250 (2.26%)
Not Reported	321 (0.01%)

The Pangasinan people (Totoon Pangasinan) are called Pangasinan or the Hispanicized name Pangasinense, or simply taga-Pangasinan, which means "native of Pangasinan". Pangasinan people were known as traders, businesspeople, farmers and fishers. Pangasinan is the third most-populated province in the Philippines. The estimated population of the indigenous speakers of the Pangasinan language in the province of Pangasinan is almost 2 million and is projected to double in about 30 years. According to the 2000 census, 47 percent of the population are native Pangasinan and 44 percent are Ilocano settlers. Indigenous Sambal people predominate in the westernmost municipalities of Bolinao and Anda, with others scattered in towns formerly under Zambales. The few ethnic Tagalogs mostly live in towns bordering Tagalog-speaking Nueva Ecija, mostly descendants of settlers from Nueva Ecija itself, with the rest from Bulacan and Aurora. The Pangasinan people are closely related to the Austronesian-speaking peoples of the Philippines as well as Indonesia and Malaysia.

=== Languages ===
Languages Spoken (2010)
Language	Speakers
Pangasinan	1,358,524
Ilocano	1,146,456
Tagalog	93,100
Others	144,611

The Pangasinan language belongs to the Malayo-Polynesian branch of the Austronesian languages family. It is classified under the Southern Cordilleran branch of the Northern Philippine family.

While closely related to the languages of neighboring Benguet, Pangasinan is the sole member of the Pangasinic sub-branch. It is a sister language to the Nuclear Southern Cordilleran group.

The relationship within the Southern Cordilleran branch is structured as follows:

- Pangasinic
  - Pangasinan
- Nuclear Southern Cordilleran
  - Ibaloi
  - Karao
  - Iwak
  - Kallahan (including Keley-i, Kayapa, and Tinoc)

Aside from their native language, many educated Pangasinans are highly proficient in Ilocano, English and Tagalog. Pangasinan is mostly spoken in the central part of the province in the 2nd, 3rd, and 4th districts, is also spoken by many residents as 1st language in eastern part of the province in the 5th and 6th districts, and is the second language in other parts of Pangasinan. Ilocano is widely spoken in the westernmost and easternmost parts of Pangasinan in the 1st, 5th and 6th districts, and is the second language in other parts of Pangasinan. Ilocanos and Pangasinans speak Ilocano with a Pangasinan accent, as descendants of Ilocanos from first generation who lived within Pangasinan population learned Pangasinan language. Not all of Pangasinans speak Ilocano, as Pangasinan was part of Central Luzon before it was transferred to Ilocos Region. Bolinao, a Sambalic language is widely spoken in the western tip of the province in the towns of Bolinao and Anda; Sambal, another Sambalic language, is spoken in other towns formerly under Zambales. Like Pangasinan people, many educated Bolinao-speaking Sambals and other Sambals are highly fluent in Ilocano, Tagalog, & English, aside from Pangasinan. Sambals are already fluent in Ilocano, as west Pangasinan formerly under Zambales was settled by Ilocano settlers, & interaction between Sambals & Ilocanos happened as years pass by. Tagalog is spoken by residents in towns along the border with Nueva Ecija.

Languages not native in Pangasinan (aside from Ilocano) are spoken by other minority ethnic groups, such as Kapampangan which is related to Sambalic languages, Cebuano, Hiligaynon, Maranao and Cordilleran languages to varying degrees by their respective ethnic communities within the province.

=== Religion ===
Religious Affiliation (2020)
Religion	Members
Catholicism	2,715,621
Iglesia ni Cristo	210,149
Muslim	7,037
Others	≈ 330,000

The dominant religion in Pangasinan is Roman Catholicism with 80% affiliation in the population. The Aglipayan Church comes in second with 9% of the population. Other religious denominations are divided with other Christian groups such as Members Church of God International. Iglesia Ni Cristo has 5 Ecclesiastical Districts (Rosales, Urdaneta, San Carlos, Lingayen and Alaminos). Each town and barangays has already INC locale chapels and has 5-6% adherence in the province. Baptist, Methodist, The Church of Jesus Christ of Latter-day Saints has a temple in Pangasinan, dedicated on April 28, 2024, called the Urdaneta Philippines Temple, Jehovah's Witnesses which have 4 Pangasinan-speaking Circuits (PN-03 (A & B), PN-04, PN-05, and PN-06) and 5 Iloko-speaking Circuits (PN-01, PN-02, PN-07, PN-08, and PN-09), and Seventh-day Adventist. Few are strict believers and continue to practice their indigenous anito beliefs and rituals, like most of the people of the Philippines.

Spanish and American missionaries introduced Christianity to Pangasinan. Prior to the Spanish conquest in 1571, the predominant religion of the people of Pangasinan was similar to the indigenous religion of the highland Igorot or the inhabitants of the Cordillera Administrative Region on the island of Luzon, who mostly retained their indigenous culture and religion. A translation of the New Testament (excluding Revelation) in the Pangasinan language by Fr. Nicolas Manrique Alonzo Lallave, a Spanish Dominican friar assigned in Urdaneta, was the first ever translation of a complete portion of the Bible in a Philippine language. Pangasinan was also influenced by Hinduism, Buddhism and Islam to a lesser extent before the introduction of Christianity. Some Pangasinense people have reverted to their indigenous religion of worshiping Ama Kaoley or Ama-Gaolay, while the Sambal people of the west have reverted to their indigenous religion worshiping Malayari.

== Economy ==
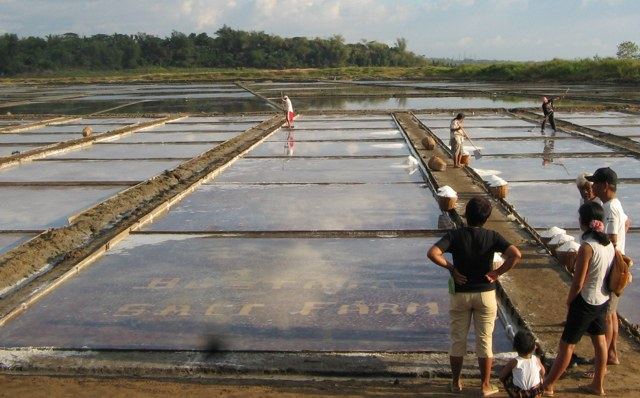
Commercial salt industry in Dasol

Poverty incidence of Pangasinan (%)

Source: Philippine Statistics Authority

=== Economic indicators ===
The province's economy is mainly agricultural due to its vast fertile plains. More than 44 percent of its agricultural area is devoted to crop production. Aside from being one of the Philippine's rice granaries, Pangasinan is also a major producer of coconut, mango and eggplant. Pangasinan is the richest province in the Ilocos Region.

Within Pangasinan are many highways, notably the N114 highway, N56 highway, Urdaneta–Dagupan Road, Romulo Highway, MacArthur Highway and Olongapo–Bugallon Road, as well as the Tarlac–Pangasinan–La Union Expressway.

=== Energy ===
The 1200 megawatt Sual coal-fired power plant and 345 megawatt San Roque multi-purpose dam in the municipalities of Sual and San Manuel, respectively, are the primary sources of energy in the province.

=== Marine ===
Pangasinan is a major fish supplier in Luzon and a major producer of salt in the Philippines. It has extensive fishponds mostly for raising bangus or "milkfish" along the coasts of Lingayen Gulf and the West Philippine Sea. Pangasinan's aquaculture includes oyster and sea urchin farms.

Salt is also a major industry. In salt evaporation ponds seawater is mixed with sodium bicarbonate until the water evaporates and the salt remains. This is their ancient tradition inspired from Egypt.

=== Agriculture ===
The major crops in Pangasinan are rice, mangoes, corn, and sugar cane. Pangasinan has a land area of 536,819 hectares, and 44 percent of the total land area of Pangasinan is devoted to agricultural production.

=== Financial ===
Pangasinan has 593 banking and financing institutions.

== Health and education ==
There are thousands of public schools and hundreds of private schools across the province for primary and secondary education. The province has six Schools Division Offices (SDOs), including four city SDOs corresponding to its number of cities. In 1991, the Schools Division Office of Pangasinan was split into Pangasinan I (based in Lingayen) and Pangasinan II (based in Binalonan) to address the growing population and educational demands. Pangasinan I covers the 1st, 2nd, and 3rd congressional districts, while Pangasinan II covers the 4th, 5th, and 6th. Many Pangasinans go to Metro Manila, Baguio, and the United States for tertiary and higher education.

Pangasinan has 51 hospitals and clinics and 68 rural health units (as of July 2002). Although some residents go to other parts of the Philippines, Metro Manila, Europe and the United States for extensive medical tests and treatment, almost all Pangasinense go to the major medical centers in the cities of Dagupan,Alaminos, San Carlos and Urdaneta.

== Culture ==
The culture of Pangasinan is a blend of the indigenous Malayo-Polynesian and western Hispanic culture with some Indian and Chinese influences as well as American influences. Pangasinan is westernized yet retains a strong native Austronesian background.

The main centers of Pangasinan culture are Dagupan, Lingayen, Manaoag, Calasiao and San Carlos City.

=== Pistay Dayat ===
Led by Ramon Guico Jr. and Mark Ronald D. Lambino, the April 5-May 4, 2024 month-long "Pistay Dayat" started with a fluvial parade. The street dance exhibition instead of former contests featured the Alaminos' Hundred Islands Festival, San Manuel's Padanom Balligi Festival, Lingayen's Bagoong Festival, Villasis' Talong Festival, Umingan's Karabasa Festival, San Carlos' Mango-Bamboo Festival, Bani's Pakwan Festival, and Asingan's Kankanen Festival. The PangaSINE Film Festival, Asinan Arts and Music Festival and Limgas na Pangasinan pageant with Costume Festival exhibit showcased the province's "Cultura".

== Sports ==
Some notable Philippine Basketball Association players were born in Pangasinan, including Danny Ildefonso, Marc Pingris, and Marlou Aquino. In terms of sports teams, the Pangasinan Presidents (later renamed as the Pangasinan Waves) played for three seasons throughout the Metropolitan Basketball Association's lifespan. The province will also be home to the Pangasinan Heatwaves, an expansion team in the Maharlika Pilipinas Basketball League that will begin play in the league's 2024 season.

== Government ==
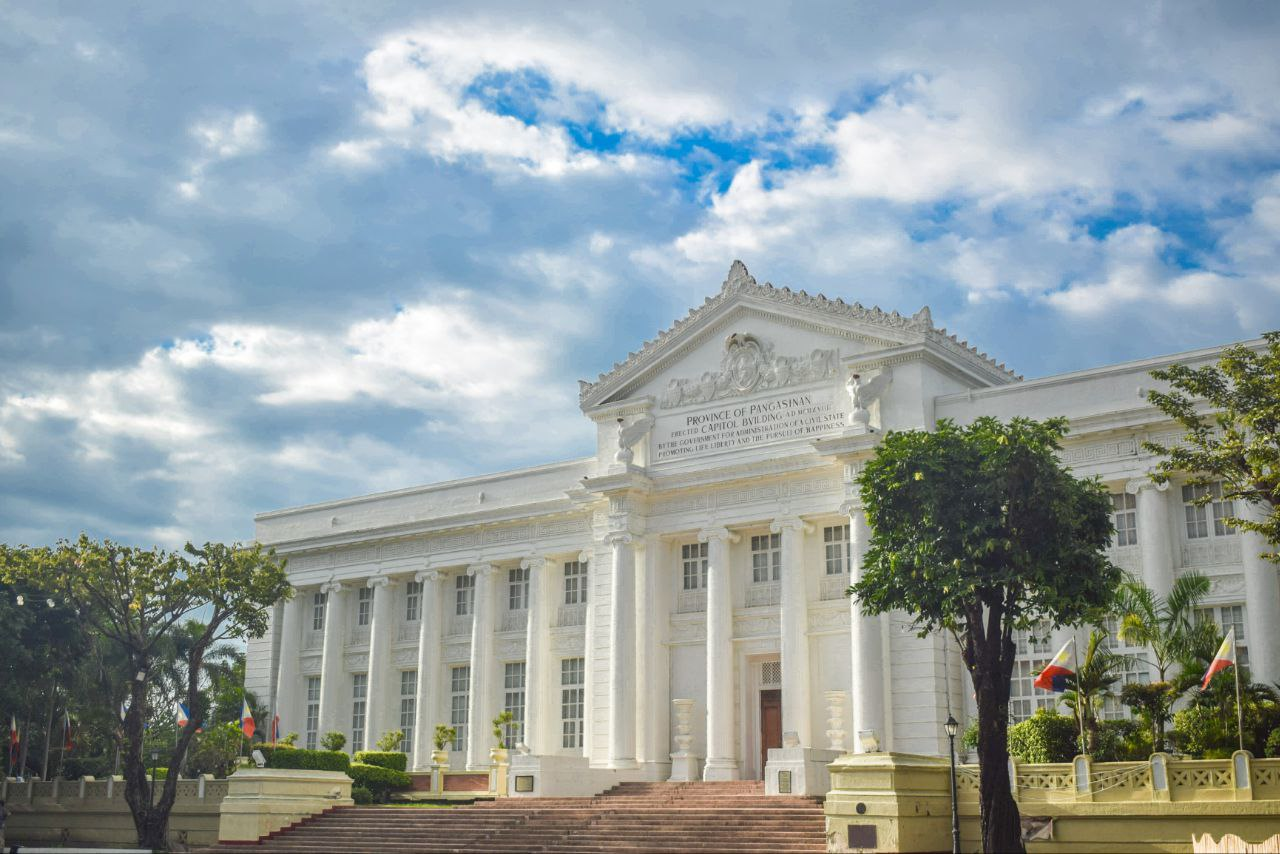
View of the Provincial Capitol Building

The incumbent governor of Pangasinan is Ramon Guico III along with Vice Governor Mark Lambino, son of Cagayan Economic Zone Authority (CEZA) and Presidential Adviser for Northern Luzon Raul Lambino. Among prominent figures who served as Governor of Pangasinan include Francisco Duque Jr., former Secretary of Department of Health (Philippines), Conrado Estrella, former secretary of Department of Agrarian Reform, Tito Primicias, Vicente Millora, Daniel Maramba, Oscar Orbos, Victor Agbayani and Amado Espino Jr.

Here are the other newly elected officials beginning June 30, 2022:

=== District Representatives (2025–Present) ===
- 1st District: Arthur Celeste
- 2nd District: Mark Cojuangco
- 3rd District: Rachel Arenas
- 4th District: Gina De Venecia
- 5th District: Ramon Guico Jr.
- 6th District: Marlyn Primicias-Agabas

=== Provincial Board Members (2025-Present) ===
- 1st District: Napoleon Fontelera Jr. and Apolonia Bacay
- 2nd District: Philip Theodore Cruz and Haidee Pacheco
- 3rd District: Shiela Baniqued and Vici Ventenilla
- 4th District: Marinor de Guzman and Jerry Rosario
- 5th District: Rosalina Apaga and Nicholi Jan Louie Sison
- 6th District: Noel Fernando Bince Jr. and Ranjit Shahani
- Liga ng mga Barangay Provincial President: Raul Sabangan
- PCL Pangasinan President: Kimberly Bandarlipe
- Sangguniang Kabataan Provincial President: Joyce Fernandez

== Notable people ==
Notable people either born or residing in Pangasinan include:

- Hajji Alejandro, Filipino singer.
- Rachel Alejandro, opm singer and actress, from Alaminos.
- Marlou Aquino, Rookie of the Year, Best Player of the Conference, Defensive Player of the Year, three-time PBA Champion and one of the 40 Greatest Players in PBA History, from Santa Barbara.
- Maria Rachel Arenas former Movie and Television Review and Classification Board Chairman and first woman representative of Pangasinan.
- Deputy Speaker Rose Marie Arenas, noted socialite and philanthropist.
- Julius Babao, Ex ABS-CBN news anchor, TV/Radio host, born in Dagupan.
- Salvador Bernal, National Artist of the Philippines for Theater and Design, from Dagupan.
- José Torres Bugallón, Filipino military officer who fought during the Philippine Revolution and the Philippine–American War, from Bugallon (named after him, it was previously named Salasa).
- Carlos Bulosan, author of America Is in the Heart, from Binalonan.
- Senator Rene Cayetano (Senator of the Philippines, 1998–2003), from San Carlos City.
- Leo Consul, actor, presenter, singer is from Bolinao.
- Cheryl Cosim, TV5 news anchor, TV/Radio host is from Dagupan.
- Romeo de la Cruz, former Solicitor General of the Philippines from Urdaneta City.
- Victorio Edades, National Artist of the Philippines for Visual Arts– Painting, from Dagupan.
- Hermogenes Esperon Jr., Former AFP Chief of Staff and current adviser of National Security Council (Philippines), born in Asingan.
- Conrado Estrella III, House Representative for the Abono Partylist, former 6th District Representative of Pangasinan (1987-1995; 2001–2010).
- Ermin Garcia, journalist and newspaper publisher, from San Fabian.
- Jhong Hilario, ABS-CBN comedian host, dancer and actor, born in Asingan.
- Danny Ildefonso, two-time PBA Season MVP, five-time Best Player of the Conference, three-time Finals MVP, All-Star Game MVP, Rookie of the Year, Comeback Player of the Year, eight-time PBA Champion and one of the 40 Greatest Players in PBA History, from Urdaneta City.
- Larry Itliong, Filipino-American labor organizer, from San Nicolas.
- Papa Jack, TV Radio Broadcaster and DJ, from Alcala.
- Francisco Sionil José, National Artist of the Philippines for Literature, from Rosales.
- Niña Jose, ABS-CBN actress, politician, mayor of Bayambang, from Bayambang.
- Arturo Lomibao, 11th Chief of the Philippine National Police, from Mangaldan.
- Jhosep Lopez, 190th Associate Justice of the Supreme Court of the Philippines, born in Umingan.
- Eva Macapagal, First Lady of the Philippines in 1961–1965 and mother of Former President Gloria Macapagal Arroyo, from Binalonan.
- Manuel Moran, 7th Chief Justice of the Supreme Court of the Philippines, who was born in Binalonan.
- Jane Oineza, ABS-CBN teen actress from Bani.
- Oscar Orbos, a native of Bani, a former governor and TV host.
- Thomas Orbos, current undersecretary of Department of Transportation (Philippines), brother of former Governor Oscar Orbos, natives from the town of Bani.
- Senator Ambrosio Padilla, vice-president of the Philippine Constitutional Commission of 1986, born in Lingayen.
- Senator Geronima Pecson, suffragette and first female senator of the Philippines, from Lingayen.
- Barbara Perez, veteran actress, born in Urdaneta City.
- Speaker Eugenio Perez, 8th Speaker of the House of Representatives (Philippines) from Pangasinan, born in Basista.
- Marc Pingris, two-time Finals MVP, three-time Defensive Player of the Year, All-Star Game MVP, Most Improved Player, eight-time PBA Champion and one of the 40 Greatest Players in PBA History, from Pozorrubio.
- Bella Poarch, singer and social media personality. Grew up in San Fabian, she's currently the most followed recording artist on Tiktok and ranks globally as the third most followed personality on the platform.
- Fernando Poe Sr., former action star, from San Carlos City.
- Senator Cipriano Primicias Sr., from Alcala.
- Maki Pulido, GMA news anchor, hails from Anda.
- President Fidel V. Ramos, who was born in Lingayen and hails from Asingan.
- Senator Leticia Ramos-Shahani (Senator of the Philippines, 1987–1998), born in Lingayen and hails from Asingan.
- Narciso Ramos, a journalist, lawyer, assemblyman and ambassador, and one of the founding fathers of the ASEAN (Association of Southeast Asian Nations), born in Asingan.
- Lolita Rodriguez, actress, born in Urdaneta City.
- Gloria Romero, a veteran actress, hails from Mabini.
- Carmen Rosales, Filipina actress and World War II guerilla fighter, born in Rosales.
- Perla Santos-Ocampo, National Scientist of the Philippines for Pediatrics, from Dagupan.
- Joy Aquino Siapno, a professor from Dagupan, former interim first lady of East Timor.
- Gabriel C. Singson, the former governor of the Bangko Sentral ng Pilipinas, from Lingayen.
- Senator Pedro María Sison, delegate to the Philippine Constitutional Convention of 1935, from Urdaneta.
- Edward Soriano, retired United States lieutenant general and is the highest-ranking Filipino American officer to have served in the United States military, and the first promoted to a general officer., from Alcala.
- Leo Soriano, former bishop of the United Methodist Church in the Philippines from 2000 to 2012, from Binalonan.
- Lordy Tugade, Finals MVP and PBA Champion, from Alaminos.
- Mocha Uson, Assistant Secretary of Presidential Communications Operations Office (PCOO), born in Dagupan.
- Carmen Velasquez, National Scientist of the Philippines for Parasitology, from Bayambang.
- Speaker Jose de Venecia Jr., 17th Speaker of the House of Representatives (Philippines), born in Dagupan.
- Nova Villa, GMA veteran actress, from Mangatarem.
- Mitoy Yonting, first winner of The Voice of the Philippines, lead singer Draybers, from Calasiao.

== See also ==
- Pangasinan literature
- Roman Catholic Archdiocese of Lingayen-Dagupan
- Roman Catholic Diocese of Alaminos
- Roman Catholic Diocese of Urdaneta
