= Dasol =

Municipality in Pangasinan, Philippines

- Municipality
- Municipality of Dasol
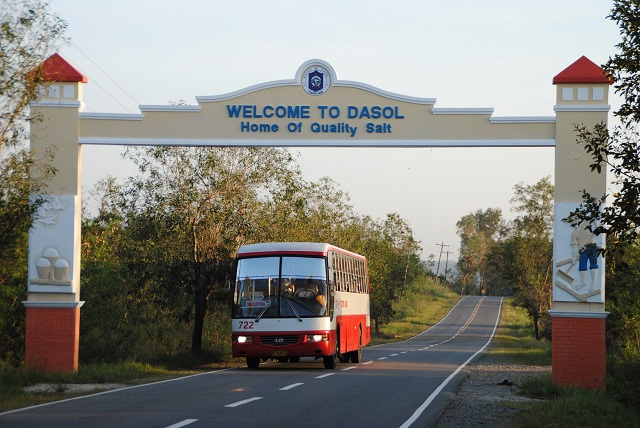
- Welcome arc

- Seal

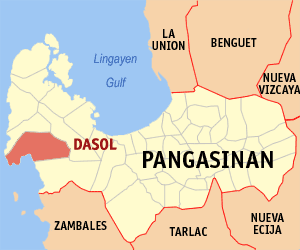
- Map of Pangasinan with Dasol highlighted
- Interactive map of Dasol
- Location within the Philippines
- Coordinates: 15°59′23″N 119°52′50″E
- Country: Philippines
- Region: Ilocos Region
- Province: Pangasinan
- District: 1st district
- Founded: 1 January 1911
- Barangays: 18 (see Barangays)

Government
  - Type: Sangguniang Bayan
  - Mayor: Rizalde J. Bernal (NP)
  - Vice Mayor: Edgardo C. Fontelera (NP)
  - Representative: Arthur F. Celeste (NP)
  - Municipal Council: Members: Jon Ray S. Aseo (NP); Mark Anthony J. Carrera (NP); Angelo Emmanuel M. Gabuyo (NP); Gerardo M. Rivera III (NP); Manuel B. Rivera (API); John Wesley P. Domagas (NP); Richard B. Garcia (NP); Johnny B. Versoza (API)
  - Electorate: 23,745 voters (2025)

Area
  - Total: 166.60 km^{2} (64.32 sq mi)
- Elevation: 39 m (128 ft)
- Highest elevation: 169 m (554 ft)
- Lowest elevation: 0 m (0 ft)

Population (2024 census)
  - Total: 31,842
  - Density: 191.13/km^{2} (495.02/sq mi)
  - Households: 7,586
- Demonym: Dasolinians

Economy
  - Income class: 2nd municipal income class
  - Poverty incidence: 13.21% (2023)
  - Revenue: ₱ 189 million (2024)
  - Assets: ₱ 625 million (2024)
  - Expenditure: ₱ 173.3 million (2024)
  - Liabilities: ₱ 64.58 million (2024)

Service provider
  - Electricity: Pangasinan 1 Electric Cooperative (PANELCO 1)
  - Water: Dasol Water District
  - Telecommunications: Smart; Globe; Digitel
  - Cable & Satellite: Cignal; Sky Direct; G Sat
- Time zone: UTC+8 (PST)
- ZIP code: 2411
- PSGC: 0105519000
- IDD : area code: +63 (0)75
- Major religions: Roman Catholic; Iglesia ni Cristo; Iglesia Filipina Independiente; Protestantism
- Feast date: 1st Friday of Lent
- Patron saint: Saint Vincent Ferrer
- Website: www.dasol.gov.ph

Dasol, officially the Municipality of Dasol (Pangasinan: Baley na Dasol; Ilocano: Ili ti Dasol; Tagalog: Bayan ng Dasol), is a municipality in the province of Pangasinan, Philippines. According to the 2024 census, it has a population of 31,842 people.

The town is a popular town for the commercial production of table salt. Seawater is fed into large ponds and water is drawn out through natural evaporation which allows the salt to be harvested. Dasol Bay occupies the whole coastline of Dasol and is where the town gets its saltwater.

== Etymology ==
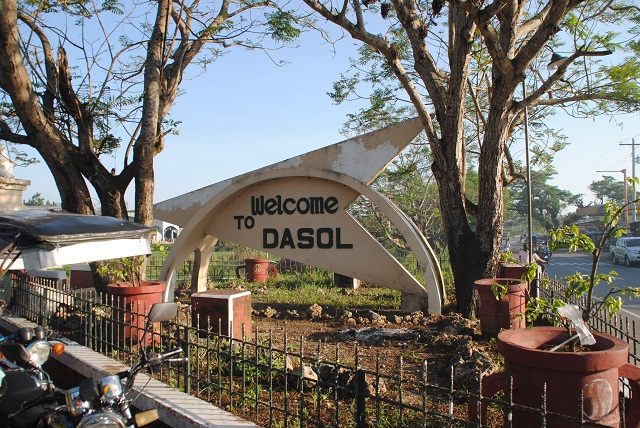
Dasol landmark

The town got its name from the medicinal herb "dosol" which abound in the locality during the Spanish period. The leaves of this herbal plant are greenish and oval. It is a relatively low tuber that was commonly used to cure infected wounds, but was found to have the unusual characteristic of disappearing - never to be seen again.

Its name was frequently mispronounced as "Dasol" by the Spaniards, so that when the place was established as municipality in the 19th century, Dasol became its official name.

== History ==
=== Spanish Colonial Era ===
As early as 1878, Dasol was part of municipality of San Isidro de Potot, which also included the present-day municipalities of Mabini (at that time was named as Barrio Balincaguin), and Burgos, in Zambales province. At that time, only a few people lived in Dasol. Balincaguin was the most thickly populated barrio and later became an independent municipality. The people, in their desire for better living conditions, moved to the south-west. They found good fishing grounds and they decided to stay along the coast in the barrio of Uli, Dasol. Dasol was repopulated by the Ilocano settlers from Paoay, Ilocos Norte headed by Don Matias Bustamante in 1830.

==== Philippine Revolution ====
A revolutionary group was organized in the Central Luzon on January 14, 1898, under General Francisco Macabulos. The Pangasinan sub-group was headed by Vicente del Prado, who together with Daniel Maramba reached an understanding to launch an attack on Spanish situations. On March 7, 1898, a simultaneous attack was suddenly made upon convents in number of towns of western Pangasinan (then as northern Zambales). Areas of San Isidro de Potot, Dasol (proper), and Eguia were among attacked. The Spanish detachments in these towns and around fifty Spanish friars were defeated.

=== American Colonial Era ===
On October 15, 1903, by virtue of Act No. 945, entitled “An Act Reducing the Twenty-five Municipalities of the Province of Zambales to Fifteen,” while still part of the Province of Zambales, the municipality of San Isidro (Burgos) was consolidated with the municipalities of Balincaguin (Mabini)and Dasol, with the seat of the municipal government at San Isidro (Burgos).

==== Secession from Zambales and other towns ====
On November 30, 1903, by virtue of Act No. 1004, the municipalities of Bolinao, Alaminos, San Isidro (Burgos), and Infanta were annexed to the Province of Pangasinan.

On December 19, 1903, by virtue of Act No. 1029, Act No. 1004 was amended to include the municipalities of Anda, Bani, and Agno among those annexed to the Province of Pangasinan. Townsfolk cited alleged lack of concern for the towns' interest and welfare by the Zambales provincial government and was encouraged to join Pangasinan province. However, for allegedly the same reason, there was a movement to rejoin Zambales, which clamor was aroused by the incumbency of then President Ramon Magsaysay, a Zambales-born president in the middle of the 1950s. This proposal was defeated when Governor Aguedo Agbayani of Pangasinan became the governor.

On October 26, 1904, the barrio of Eguia, then a part of the municipality of San Isidro (Burgos), was annexed to and consolidated with the municipality of Infanta.

On December 15, 1910, by virtue of Executive Order No. 84, issued by Governor-General William Cameron Forbes, Dasol was separated from San Isidro (Burgos), effective January 1, 1911.

==== Boundary issues ====
Ever since its creation, the boundaries of Dasol with the municipalities of Burgos, Mabini and Infanta remain vague, for what the leaders of Dasol had claimed to be the boundaries then agreed upon and as allegedly borne out by records, are no longer respected by the respective officials of said adjoining municipalities. Instead, they have encroached into Dasol's domain. During the incumbency of Mayor Liceralde, he made an attempt to settle Dasol's boundary with Mabini, but even after two separate conferences between the officials of the two towns were already had, each group was adamant in its own version. Considering that there was no visible sign of a probability for an amicable settlement of the dispute, the idea was abandoned so as to give way to court battle. He allegedly said that it was time-consuming to gather relevant documentary evidence (parol evidence no longer available due to the death of reliable witnesses) that would clinch the case for Dasol. The same appears to be true with respect to the other boundary conflicts.

=== Japanese occupation ===
Dasol Bay witnessed several naval battles in World War II. On August 23, 1944, while searching for new targets, the American submarines USS Harder and USS Hake were attacked by Kaibokan CD-22 and PB-102 (ex-USS Stewart (DD-224)). Thinking that it was just a Japanese minesweeper and a three-stack Thai destroyer Phra Ruang, the Japanese vessel operated in consort with the anti-submarine vessel attacked and sank the Harder through with depth charges. The Hake was also attacked but escaped and arrived at Fremantle Harbor, Australia on September 24, 1944.

On November 6, 1944, while guarding convoy Ma-Ta 31, the Japanese cruiser Kumano was attacked by a US submarine wolf-pack consisting of the Batfish, the Guitarro, the Bream, theRaton and the Ray. In all, the American submarines launched 23 torpedoes towards the convoy, two of which struck the Kumano. The first hit destroyed the ship's recently replaced bow, and the second damaged its starboard engine room. The Kumano escaped and was towed to Dasol Bay by the cargo ship Doryo Maru, and from there the ship was moved to the beach and underwent repairs. On November 25, 1944, the Kumano came under aerial attack by aircraft launched by the USS Ticonderoga. Five torpedoes and four 500 pound bombs struck the ship, and rolled over and sank in about 31 m (100 ft) of water.

== Geography ==
The Municipality of Dasol is a small town in western Pangasinan, situated in a plateau, on the Olongapo–Bugallon Road. It is bounded l by the municipalities of Burgos and Mabini to the north, the mineral-rich Zambales Mountains to the east, the municipality of Infanta to the south, and the vast South China Sea to the west. It has an area of about 230 square kilometers.

Dasol is situated 68.78 kilometres (42.74 mi) from the provincial capital Lingayen, and 277.71 kilometres (172.56 mi) from the country's capital city of Manila.

=== Barangays ===
Barangays of Dasol

Dasol is politically subdivided into 18 barangays. Each barangay consists of puroks and some have sitios.

- Alilao
- Amalbalan
- Bobonot
- Eguia
- Gais-Guipe
- Hermosa
- Macalang
- Magsaysay
- Malacapas
- Malimpin
- Osmeña
- Petal
- Poblacion
- San Vicente
- Tambac
- Tambobong
- Uli
- Viga

Dasol had seven barrios (now called barangay) when it was created. These were Tambobong, Tanobong, Uli, Malacapas, Bongalon, Alilao and Poblacion. Eguia was then part of Infanta and was annexed to Dasol in 1925. As years went by and due to its increasing population, two more barrios were created. Eguia was divided to form other three barangays namely Macalang, Viga and Tambac. Then came the time when Tambobong was to create Magsaysay and Tanobong (Malimpin) was divided to create San Vicente. Later, Bongalon (Hermosa) was divided to create Petal out of its two sitios Penec and Espital and from Alilao, two more barangays were formed now known as Amalbalan and Gais-Guipe. The sitios of Macalang, Pantol, Tapac and Pagdagaan were constituted into a barrio of Macalang by virtue of Republic Act 1707.

=== Climate ===
Climate data for Dasol, Pangasinan
Month	Jan	Feb	Mar	Apr	May	Jun	Jul	Aug	Sep	Oct	Nov	Dec	Year
Mean daily maximum °C (°F)	31 (88)	31 (88)	33 (91)	34 (93)	34 (93)	33 (91)	32 (90)	31 (88)	31 (88)	32 (90)	31 (88)	31 (88)	32 (90)
Mean daily minimum °C (°F)	21 (70)	21 (70)	23 (73)	25 (77)	25 (77)	25 (77)	25 (77)	24 (75)	24 (75)	24 (75)	23 (73)	22 (72)	24 (74)
Average precipitation mm (inches)	4.3 (0.17)	19.1 (0.75)	27.3 (1.07)	45.2 (1.78)	153.3 (6.04)	271.3 (10.68)	411.1 (16.19)	532 (20.9)	364.4 (14.35)	182.5 (7.19)	56.3 (2.22)	24.4 (0.96)	2,091.2 (82.3)
Average rainy days	3	2	3	5	14	17	22	23	21	13	7	4	134
Source: World Weather Online (modeled/calculated data, not measured locally)

== Demographics ==
Population census of Dasol
Year	Pop.	±% p.a.
1918	3,107	—
1939	7,472	+4.27%
1948	9,141	+2.27%
1960	11,043	+1.59%
1970	12,955	+1.61%
1975	15,304	+3.40%
1980	16,957	+2.07%
1990	19,671	+1.50%
1995	23,551	+3.43%
2000	25,381	+1.62%
2007	27,027	+0.87%
2010	26,991	−0.05%
2015	29,110	+1.45%
2020	31,355	+1.58%
2024	31,842	+0.37%
Source: Philippine Statistics Authority

=== Religions ===
- Jehovah's Witnesses
- Roman Catholic Church
- Philippine Independent Church
- Iglesia ni Cristo
- United Methodist Church
- Assembly of God
- Pentecostal
- Seventh Day Adventist
- Iglesia Mistica De Dios
- Jesus is Lord
- Lord of the Harvests

== Economy ==
Poverty incidence of Dasol (%)

Source: Philippine Statistics Authority

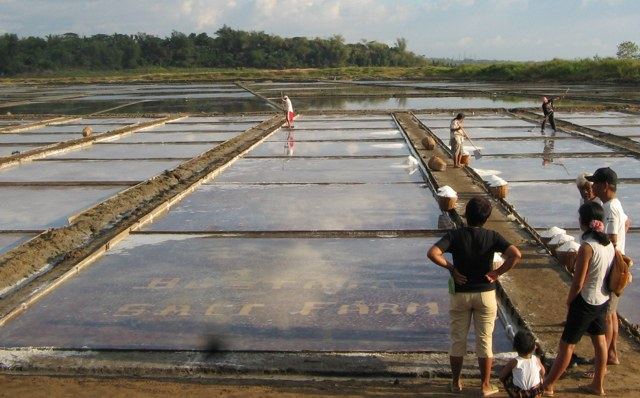
Salt Evaporation Pond Industry

The basic livelihood of the town includes salt making, small scale fishing, bagoong making, charcoal making, fruitwine making, and farming (mostly rice crops).

An average family raises only PhP 5,561.67 and spends PhP 4,506.58 mostly for basic needs.

Majority of Dasol's income came from commercial salt making, with 14 major salt producers in the municipality.

Dasol is rich in non-metallic resources. It has 360,230,000 m³ of limestone and 5,245 metric tons of guano.

About 0.5 km^{2} of Dasol is used for commercial crops mostly for rice and vegetable production. The municipality have several coconut and mango plantations. Since it lie on the Zambales Mountain Range, the municipality have 6,513 mango fruit bearing trees. One of the plantations is the Carolina Farm and Mango Orchard owned by Menardo Jimenez, former GMA Network president.

Most of Dasol's livestock includes poultry, swine, cattle, goats, and carabaos with 6,370 livestock raisers all across the municipality.

=== Mining Areas ===
- Barangay Tambac
- Barangay Viga

Registered Mining Operators:

- A & P Mineral Trading

== Government ==
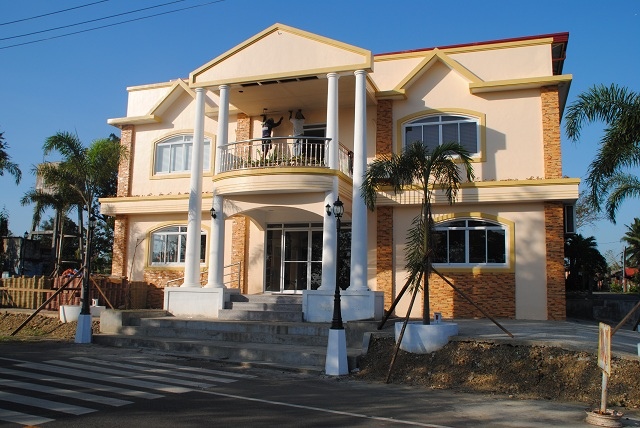
Dasol Municipal Hall

=== Local government ===
Dasol, belonging to the first congressional district of the province of Pangasinan, is governed by a mayor designated as its local chief executive and by a municipal council as its legislative body in accordance with the Local Government Code. The mayor, vice mayor, and the councilors are elected directly by the people through an election which is being held every three years.

=== Elected officials ===
Members of the Dasol Municipal Government (2025-2028)
Position	Name
Congressman	Arthur F. Celeste (NP)
Municipal Mayor	Rizalde J. Bernal (NP)
Municipal Vice-Mayor	Edgardo C. Fontelera (NP)
Municipal Councilors	Jon Ray S. Aseo (NP)
Municipal Councilors	Mark Anthony J. Carrera (NP)
Municipal Councilors	Angelo Emmanuel M. Gabuyo (NP)
Municipal Councilors	Gerardo M. Rivera III (NP)
Municipal Councilors	Manuel B. Rivera (API)
Municipal Councilors	John Wesley P. Domagas (NP)
Municipal Councilors	Richard B. Garcia (NP)
Municipal Councilors	Johnny B. Versoza (API)

=== Political History ===
No record has been found regarding the reign of a governardorcillo in this municipality but records show that there was already an organized government, with Santos Jimenez, Vicente Liceralde, Gaspar Estrada and Pedro Estrada as early capitan municipáles.

Cornelio Estrada was the capitan municipál from 1898 until 1900. At the height of the Katipunan resistance against the Americans, Francisco Bernal was the capitan municipál.

During the time San Isidro Putot was established, the town had been under three rulers, who ruled in different terms, namely: Lucas Bonilla (1899–1901), Nazario Nacar (1901–1903), and Paulino Mendoza (1904–1908).

When Dasol municipality was created, Apolonio Casipit was its first president. He was succeeded by Leandro Cristobal from 1912 to 1916. Calixto Tobias was the municipal president from 1916. In 1918, Tobias was assassinated by an unknown assailant. His unexpired term was served by his vice mayor, Severino delos Reyes. In the following election, Apolonio Casipit won and served his second term from 1919 to 1922. Succeeding him was Pedro dela Rosa from 1922 to 1925.

In the years 1925 to 1931, Marcelo Jimenez was elected and served for two consecutive terms. In the following election, Flaviano Cristobal served as the last Municipal President from 1932 to 1935. He was elevated as Dasol's first Municipal Mayor, when the Commonwealth Government was established. He was followed by Juan Castro (1937–1939). Mayor Castro failed to serve the entire period of his term due to health conditions making his vice mayor, Emiliana R. Jimenez as Acting Municipal Mayor for the unexpired term (1940). In the next election, Flaviano Cristobal ran again and won, making him as the Municipal Mayor of Dasol at the outbreak of the second world war. He was forced to vacate the office in 1944 when he joined guerilla movement intervention. His vice mayor, Teodoro Milgar served as acting mayor for the unexpired term. When Philippine Independence came in 1946, Marcelo A. Jimenez was appointed by President Roxas as Acting Municipal Mayor. Like Mayor Castro, Mayor Jimenez failed to serve the entire period of his term in the same year.

Isidro Bustria served the unexpired term of Marcelo A. Jimenez from 1946 until 1948. In the 1948 election, Damaso E. Rivera won and served as municipal mayor. In 1950, Rivera failed to finish his term and his vice mayor, Segundo Basuel, served his unexpired term. In 1952, Cristino R. Jimenez won and served for four consecutive terms (1952–1967), winning three re-elections. In 1968, Ramon G. Liceralde won as mayor. 1976 local elections was suspended due to the existence of martial law. Liceralde, was so far the only lawyer-mayor of Dasol. In 1978, Benjamin Ochotorena was appointed Municipal Mayor until 1980. Ludovico R. Espinosa was elected and served as mayor from July 1980 until the government reorganization on June 10, 1986, by President Corazon Aquino. Manuel Bunao was appointed OIC Mayor from June 16, 1986, to November 17, 1986. Espinosa appealed and he was reinstalled on November 18, 1986. In June 1988, he was elected and served a new mandate. In the May 11, 1992 elections, Espinosa was defeated by Sergio N. Jimenez. Jimenez also defeated Espinosa in two successive elections (1995,1998). Due to term limits set by the Philippine Local Government Code of 1991, Sergio Jimenez gave way to his wife, Angelita Ocampo-Jimenez to run for the 2001 elections. Mrs. Jimenez won beating Vice Mayor Moises Alejos. In the 2004 elections, Mrs. Jimenez won her second term unchallenged. In the 2007 elections, Councilor Noel Nacar challenged Jimenez and won as new mayor of Dasol. He then served for three consecutive terms. In the 2016 elections, Nacar had his daughter run for mayor as his successor but was defeated by Eric Verzosa, son of former PNP Director General Jesus Verzosa. In the 2019 elections, Noel Nacar ran again and won beating incumbent Eric Verzosa. In 2022, outgoing vice mayor Rizalde Bernal ran for mayor and beat incumbent Noel Nacar. In the 2025 elections, Nacar ran as vice governor of Pangasinan while his wife Baby Nacar ran for mayor but lost to incumbent Rizalde Bernal.

== Culture ==
=== Annual festivals ===
Dasol Feast dates 2027-2040
Year	From	To
2027	February 10	February 12
2028	March 1	March 3
2029	February 14	February 16
2030	March 6	March 8
2031	February 26	February 28
2032	February 11	February 13
2033	March 2	March 4
2034	February 22	February 24
2035	February 7	February 9
2036	February 27	March 1
2037	February 18	February 20
2038	March 10	March 12
2039	February 23	February 25
2040	February 15	February 17

Dasol celebrates the annual feast of its Catholic patron Saint Vincent Ferrer every first Friday of Lent (after Ash Wednesday). Dasol follows the tradition of every Filipino fiesta. At sunrise, a thanksgiving mass is rendered simultaneously in all Roman Catholic Church and Philippine Independent Church locations in Dasol. at 9:00 AM, a parade of all public officials and government employees are held at Barangay Poblacion public roads. In the afternoon, an open sports tournament sponsored by the Youth Council are held in the municipal hall compound. By the evening, senior citizen organizations and Filipino-American organizations celebrate a cocktail party at the municipal auditorium. Most of the attendants do ballroom dancing.

During the months of April and May barangay-based feasts were celebrated.

== Education ==
The Dasol Schools District Office governs all educational institutions within the municipality. It oversees the management and operations of all private and public elementary and high schools.

=== Primary and elementary schools ===
- Amalbalan Elementary School
- Bobonot Elementary School
- Tomas N. Bonilla Elementary School
- Dasol Catholic School
- Don Juan Bernal Sr. Elementary School
- Eguia Elementary School
- Gais Guipe Elementary School
- Macalang Elementary School
- Juan Bustamante Elementary School
- Malacapas Elementary School
- Malimpin Elementary School
- Mac Arthur Salanga Memorial Elementary School
- Petal Elementary School
- Tambac Elementary School
- Tambobong Elementary School
- Uli Elementary School
- Viga Elementary School

=== Secondary schools ===
- Dasol Integrated School
- Eguia National High School
- Malimpin National High School
- Tambobong National High School

=== Higher educational institution ===
Don Marcelo Jimenez Memorial Polytechnic Institute

== Gallery ==
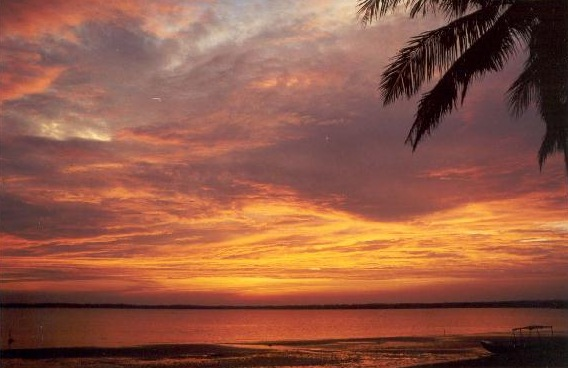
Dasol Bay sunset

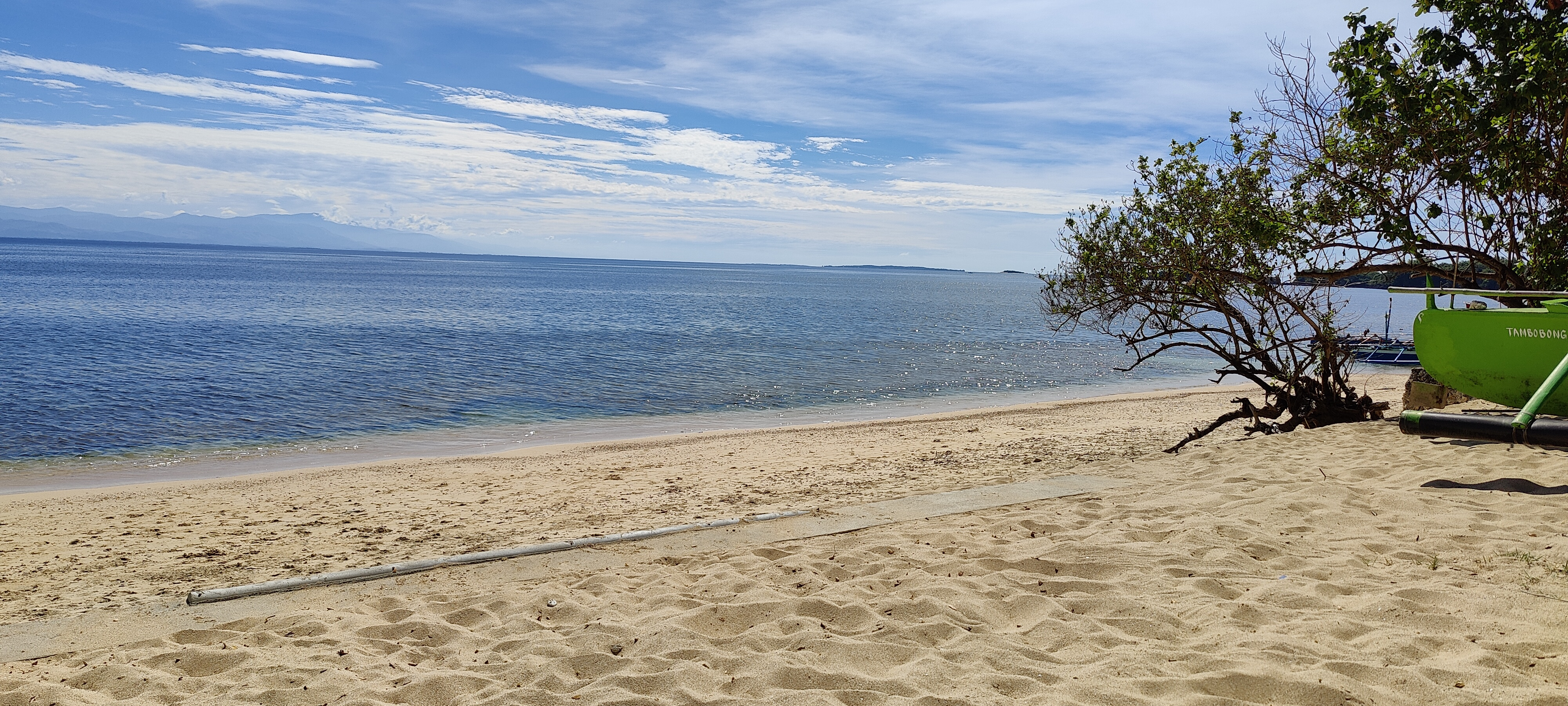
Beach in Barangay Tambobong

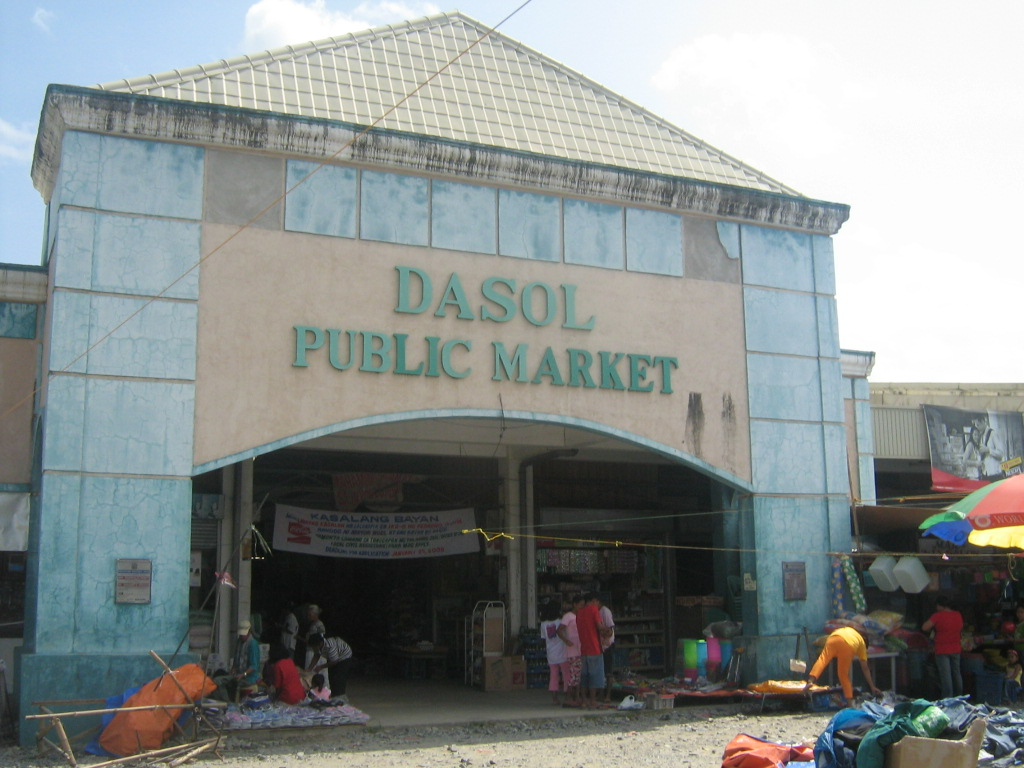
Dasol Public Market

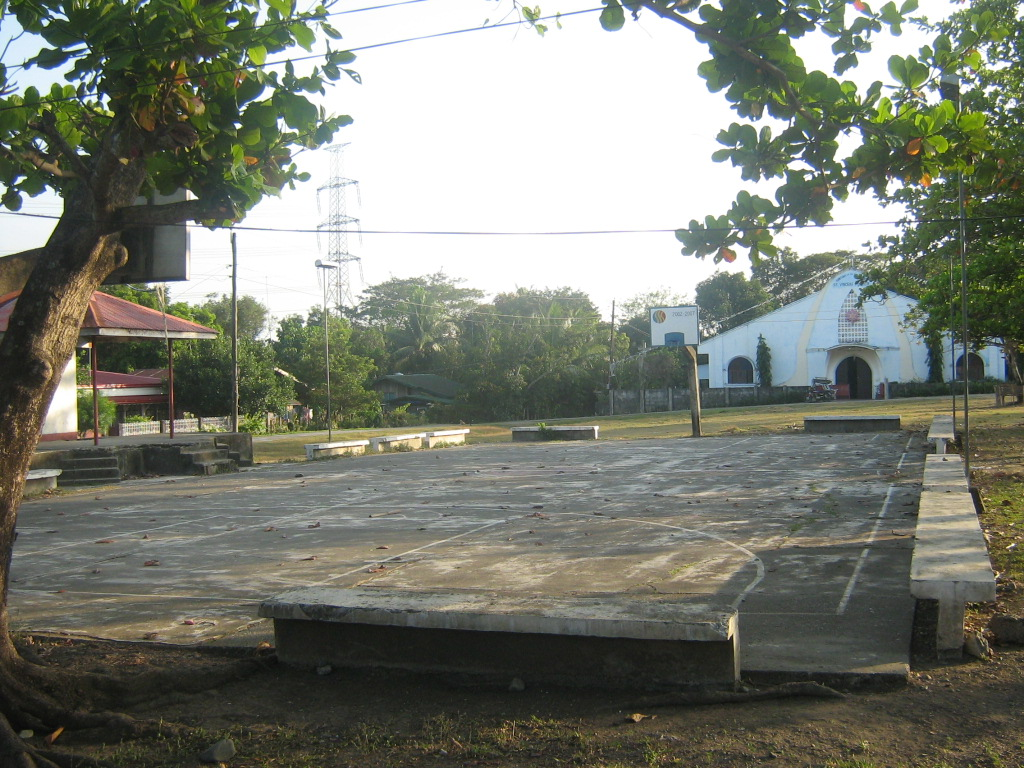
"Old Town"

== See also ==
- Salt evaporation pond
- USS Harder (SS-257), a US submarine submerged in the Battle of Dasol Bay, World War II
- USS Ticonderoga (CV-14), US aircraft carrier
- Japanese cruiser Kumano, a Japanese cruiser
