= 2022 Pangasinan local elections =

Elections in province of the Philippines

- May 9, 2022
- Registered: 2,096,936
- Turnout: 87.18% (▲6.89 pp)
- Gubernatorial election
- Registered: 1,703,528 (Note: Excluding Dagupan City)
- Turnout: 86.99% (▲6.91 pp)
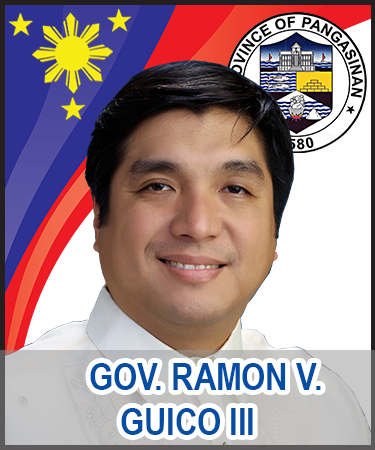

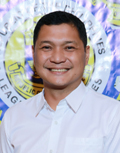
Candidate	Ramon Guico III	Amado Espino III
Party	Nacionalista	API
Running mate	Mark Lambino	Nestor Reyes
Popular vote	888,027	699,441
Percentage	55.61%	43.80%

Guico
40–50%
50–60%
60–70%
70–80%
80–90%
>90%
Espino
40–50%
50–60%
60–70%
70–80%
80–90%
>90%
Tie/No data/No election
Governor before election
Amado Espino III
API
Elected Governor
Ramon Guico III
Nacionalista
- Vice gubernatorial election
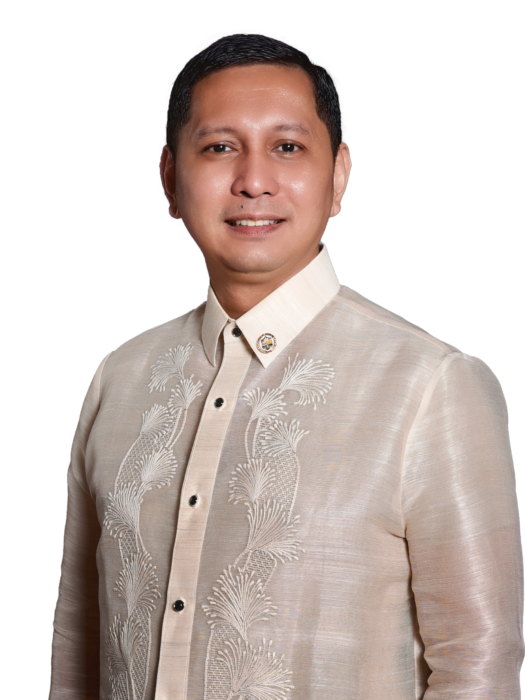

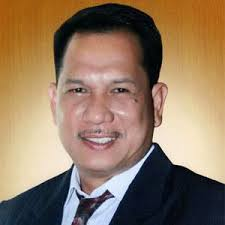
Candidate	Mark Lambino	Nestor "Nikiboy" Reyes
Party	Lakas	API
Popular vote	880,348	552,212
Percentage	61.45%	38.55%

Lambino 50–60% 60–70% 70–80% 80–90%	Reyes 50–60% 70–80%	N/A
Vice Governor before election
Mark Lambino
Lakas
Elected Vice Governor
Mark Lambino
Lakas

Local elections were held in the province of Pangasinan on May 9, 2022 as part of the 2022 Philippine general election. Pangasinan voters will elect a governor, a vice governor, 6 members of the House of Representatives that will represent the 6 congressional districts of the province, and 12 out of 15 members of the Pangasinan Provincial Board. The officials elected will assume their respective offices on June 30, 2022, for a three-year-long term.

== Background ==
In the 2019 local elections, Amado Espino III ran for reelection as Governor of Pangasinan, facing Arthur Celeste, a former representative of Pangasinan’s 1st district. Espino defeated Celeste and subsequently sought his third and final term as governor.

Meanwhile, key political figures in Pangasinan — Arthur Celeste, Mark Lambino, Ramon Guico III, Cezar Quiambao, and Mark Cojuangco — formed a coalition opposing the Espino political family.

== Electoral system ==
Local elections in the Philippines are held every second Monday of May starting in 1992 and every three years thereafter. Single-seat positions (governor, vice governor, and House representative) are elected via first-past-the-post-voting. The governor and vice governor are elected by the province at-large, while the House representative and provincial board members are elected per district.

provincial board elections are done via plurality block voting; Pangsinan is divided into six districts, with each district sending two board members. There are three other ex officio seats, the president of the Philippine Councilors’ League, the president of the Association of Barangay Captains, and the president of the Sangguniang Kabataan (SK) Provincial Federation; these will be determined later in the year at the barangay and Sangguniang Kabataan elections.

== Governor ==
Amado Espino III runs for his 3rd and last term as governor. Ramon Guico III the incumbent representative from Pangasinan's 5th legislative district challenges Espino. Ramon Guico III defeats Amado Espino III by 11.8 points in a stunning upset.

=== Candidates ===
- Amado Espino III (API), governor of Pangasinan (2016–2022)
- Ramon Guico III (NP), incumbent representative from Pangasinan's 5th legislative district (2019–2022)

Candidate	Party	Votes	%
Ramon Guico III	Nacionalista	888,027	55.61
Amado Espino III (incumbent)	API	699,441	43.80
Rolly Jimenez	Independent	6,224	0.39
Caloy Padilla	PGRP	3,251	0.20
Total		1,596,943	100.00
Valid votes		1,596,943	94.06
Invalid/blank votes		100,781	5.94
Total votes		1,697,724	100.00
Registered voters/turnout		2,096,936	80.96
Nacionalista gain from PDP-Laban			

=== Per City/Municipality ===
City/Municipality	Ramon V. Guico III		Amado I. Espino III		Rolly Jimenez		Caloy Padilla	
City/Municipality	Votes	%	Votes	%	Votes	%	Votes	%
Agno	7,093	43.9	8,987	55.6	53	0.3	28	0.2
Aguilar	12,199	49.7	12,210	49.7	92	0.4	47	0.2
Alaminos	28,916	57.6	21,011	41.9	145	0.3	95	0.2
Alcala	12,241	47.5	13,467	52.2	58	0.2	29	0.1
Anda	11,018	51.6	10,227	47.9	68	0.3	48	0.2
Asingan	21,501	64.5	11,701	35.1	75	0.2	54	0.2
Balungao	10,909	64.1	6,063	35.6	23	0.1	21	0.1
Bani	15,438	60.0	10,145	39.4	75	0.3	59	0.2
Basista	8,068	38.7	12,693	60.9	60	0.3	26	0.1
Bautista	4,275	22.7	14,479	76.8	74	0.4	13	0.1
Bayambang	36,175	53.5	30,994	45.9	258	0.4	164	0.2
Binalonan	24,559	76.2	7,587	23.5	55	0.2	34	0.1
Binmaley	23,732	47.0	26,438	52.3	251	0.5	125	0.2
Bolinao	28,043	73.6	9,659	25.4	241	0.6	157	0.4
Bugallon	20,463	49.8	20,448	49.7	128	0.3	71	0.2
Burgos	5,482	49.3	5,559	50.0	50	0.4	22	0.2
Calasiao	27,434	49.5	27,670	49.9	207	0.4	85	0.2
Dasol	10,640	56.8	7,961	42.5	106	0.6	29	0.2
Infanta	9,020	64.9	4,803	34.5	50	0.4	34	0.2
Labrador	9,507	61.3	5,890	38.0	53	0.3	61	0.4
Laoac	11,608	61.2	7,312	38.5	32	0.2	21	0.1
Lingayen	29,336	48.6	30,690	50.9	203	0.3	88	0.1
Mabini	7,711	52.8	6,821	46.7	47	0.3	26	0.2
Malasiqui	45,819	65.5	23,616	33.8	332	0.5	157	0.2
Manaoag	21,653	55.6	17,077	43.8	187	0.5	55	0.1
Mangaldan	28,103	49.1	28,578	49.9	389	0.7	147	0.3
Mangatarem	26,193	59.3	17,712	40.1	210	0.5	88	0.2
Mapandan	12,004	54.9	9,782	44.7	65	0.3	27	0.1
Natividad	7,654	51.3	7,225	48.4	25	0.2	21	0.1
Pozorrubio	27,306	65.9	13,941	33.6	134	0.3	75	0.2
Rosales	24,783	65.9	12,641	33.6	140	0.4	71	0.2
San Carlos	49,844	50.5	48,225	48.9	414	0.4	181	0.2
San Fabian	29,134	64.4	15,635	34.5	329	0.7	161	0.4
San Jacinto	14,587	61.4	9,025	38.0	78	0.3	49	0.2
San Manuel	17,642	69.4	7,657	30.1	87	0.3	27	0.1
San Nicolas	11,358	51.7	10,529	47.9	51	0.2	49	0.2
San Quintin	12,785	64.1	7,066	35.4	54	0.3	31	0.2
Santa Barbara	24,835	53.5	21,280	45.9	182	0.4	89	0.2
Santa Maria	10,625	55.8	8,333	43.8	49	0.3	39	0.2
Santo Tomas	5,061	61.8	3,114	38.0	8	0.1	9	0.1
Sison	18,088	67.0	8,745	32.4	72	0.3	76	0.3
Sual	12,082	47.8	12,988	51.4	111	0.4	101	0.4
Tayug	15,997	65.6	8,280	33.9	63	0.3	49	0.2
Umingan	23,901	55.5	18,844	43.7	207	0.5	123	0.3
Urbiztondo	12,205	37.0	20,571	62.3	161	0.5	66	0.2
Urdaneta	46,046	57.8	33,121	41.6	343	0.4	169	0.2
Villasis	14,954	39.6	22,641	59.9	131	0.3	54	0.1
TOTAL	888,027	55.6	699,441	43.8	6,224	0.4	3,251	0.2

=== Per Legislative District ===
District	Ramon V. Guico III		Amado I. Espino III		Rolly Jimenez		Caloy Padilla	
District	Votes	%	Votes	%	Votes	%	Votes	%
1st	135,443	57.6	98,161	41.7	946	0.4	599	0.3
2nd	141,703	48.8	146,652	50.6	1,158	0.4	572	0.2
3rd	196,111	54.5	161,567	44.9	1,458	0.4	703	0.2
4th	93,477	56.6	70,315	42.3	983	0.6	412	0.3
5th	164,138	56.6	124,407	42.9	907	0.3	480	0.2
6th	157,155	61.2	98,339	38.3	774	0.3	485	0.2

== Vice Governor ==
Mark Ronald Lambino ran for election seeking to be re-elected as Vice Governor of Pangasinan. Nestor Reyes ran for election seeking to unseat Mark Ronald Lambino from his seat as Vice Governor of Pangasinan. After the votes were counted, Lambino beats Provincial Board Member Nikiboy Reyes by 11.8 points.

Candidate	Party	Votes	%
Mark Lambino (incumbent)	Lakas	880,348	61.45
Nestor Reyes	API	552,212	38.55
Total		1,432,560	100.00
Valid votes		1,432,560	84.38
Invalid/blank votes		265,164	15.62
Total votes		1,697,724	100.00
Registered voters/turnout		2,096,936	80.96
Lakas-CMD hold			

=== Per City/Municipality ===
City/Municipality	Mark Ronald Lambino		Nestor "Nikiboy" Reyes	
City/Municipality	Votes	%	Votes	%
Agno	7,463	51.9	6,916	48.1
Aguilar	11,286	48.9	11,781	51.1
Alaminos	31,904	68.9	14,391	31.1
Alcala	12,060	53.5	10,476	46.5
Anda	13,090	69.5	5,751	30.5
Asingan	17,521	63.7	9,969	36.3
Balungao	8,807	60.9	5,663	39.1
Bani	16,249	70.0	6,968	30.0
Basista	8,126	42.2	11,129	57.8
Bautista	5,865	34.5	11,136	65.5
Bayambang	41,611	66.1	21,363	33.9
Binalonan	20,020	72.3	7,670	27.7
Binmaley	21,729	45.2	26,323	54.8
Bolinao	29,184	85.2	5,062	14.8
Bugallon	20,229	53.2	17,819	46.8
Burgos	6,044	62.4	3,643	37.6
Calasiao	28,035	56.1	21,961	43.9
Dasol	11,168	67.5	5,375	32.5
Infanta	8,485	73.6	3,036	26.4
Labrador	8,389	59.8	5,645	40.2
Laoac	9,487	57.6	6,991	42.4
Lingayen	33,995	60.2	22,519	39.8
Mabini	7,545	56.3	5,861	43.7
Malasiqui	43,830	68.9	19,789	31.1
Manaoag	23,887	68.8	10,812	31.2
Mangaldan	38,618	70.4	16,232	29.6
Mangatarem	21,449	52.5	19,445	47.5
Mapandan	11,851	58.8	8,301	41.2
Natividad	7,251	55.5	5,808	44.5
Pozorrubio	25,549	68.5	11,768	31.5
Rosales	23,076	69.7%	10,034	30.3%
San Carlos	52,816	58.9%	36,920	41.1%
San Fabian	25,069	62.5%	15,065	37.5%
San Jacinto	13,982	66.3%	7,116	33.7%
San Manuel	13,800	63.8%	7,816	36.2%
San Nicolas	9,831	53.1%	8,697	46.9%
San Quintin	10,629	61.4%	6,672	38.6%
Santa Barbara	26,393	63.0%	15,523	37.0%
Santa Maria	10,362	62.0%	6,348	38.0%
Santo Tomas	4,386	62.7%	2,612	37.3%
Sison	16,765	74.2%	5,842	25.8%
Sual	12,399	53.1%	10,953	46.9%
Tayug	12,894	62.7	7,655	37.3
Umingan	20,250	54.6	16,859	45.4
Urbiztondo	12,913	42.2	17,673	57.8
Urdaneta	44,369	65.1	23,764	34.9
Villasis	19,687	60.1	13,060	39.9
TOTAL	880,348	61.5	552,212	38.5

=== Per Legislative District ===
District	Mark Lambino		Nikiboy Reyes	
District	Votes	%	Votes	%
1st	143,531	67.9	67,956	32.1
2nd	138,116	51.1	132,334	48.9
3rd	204,536	62.3	123,857	37.7
4th	101,556	67.4	49,225	32.6
5th	158,188	62.9	93,319	37.1
6th	134,421	61.1	85,521	38.9

== Provincial Board ==
The Pangasinan Provincial Board is composed of 15 board members, 12 of whom are elected.

=== Results ===
Party	Votes	%	Seats
Abante Pangasinan-Ilokano Party	1,324,279	72.44	8
Nationalist People's Coalition	563,186	30.81	2
Nacionalista	373,911	20.45	2
Lakas–CMD	203,352	11.12	0
PROMDI	60,874	3.33	0
Independent	60,439	3.31	0
PDP-Laban	15,644	0.86	0
PPM	5,216	0.29	0
PFP	3,707	0.20	0
NUP	2,168	0.12	0
PGRP	837	0.05	0
Ex officio seats			3
Total	2,613,613	100.00	15

=== First district ===
Pangasinan's 1st provincial district consists of the same area as Pangasinan's 1st legislative district. Two board members are elected from this provincial district.

==== Results ====
Candidate	Party	Votes	%
Nong Fontelera	Nacionalista Party	115,366	45.12
Apple Bacay	Nacionalista Party	106,387	41.61
Orange Humilde-Verzosa (incumbent)	API	62,091	24.29
Ricky Camba	Lakas-CMD	71,787	28.08
Total		355,631	100.00

=== Second district ===
Pangasinan's 2nd provincial district consists of the same area as Pangasinan's 2nd legislative district. Two board members are elected from this provincial district.

==== Results ====
Candidate	Party	Votes	%
Philip Theodore Cruz	Nationalist People's Coalition	123,722	39.97
Haidee Pacheco	API	114,569	37.01
Von Mark Mendoza (incumbent)	Nationalist People's Coalition	109,708	35.44
Randall Bernal	API	98,738	31.90
Manuel Merrera	Independent	21,245	6.86
Bony Batecan	PDP-Laban	10,917	3.53
Total		478,899	100.00

=== 3rd provincial district ===
Pangasinan's 3rd provincial district consists of the same area as Pangasinan's 3rd legislative district. Two board members are elected from this provincial district.

==== Results ====
Candidate	Party	Votes	%
Shiela Baniqued	API	218,204	57.03
Vici Ventanilla (incumbent)	Nationalist People's Coalition	150,874	39.43
Mark Roy Macanlalay	Nationalist People's Coalition	132,939	34.74
Raymund Camacho	API	51,188	13.38
Generoso Tulagan	PROMDI	44,338	11.59
Rogelio Danoli	PROMDI	16,536	4.32
Eduardo Gonzales	Partido Pederal ng Maharlika	5,216	1.36
Edgar Ramirez	Independent	4,727	1.24
James Mamaradlo	PDP-Laban	3,707	0.97
Total		627,729	100.00

=== 4th provincial district ===
Pangasinan's 4th provincial district consists of the same area as Pangasinan's 4th legislative district, excluding the city of Dagupan. Two board members are elected from this provincial district.

==== Results ====
Candidate	Party	Votes	%
Noy De Guzman	API	80,658	26.90
Jerry Rosario (incumbent)	API	53,848	17.96
Gerald Gubatan	Nacionalista Party	51,723	17.25
Ritche Abalos	Nationalist People's Coalition	45,943	15.32
Ramon Bautista	Lakas-CMD	26,272	8.76
Jaming Libunao	Nacionalista Party	22,362	7.46
Santiago Marcella Jr.	Independent	2,536	0.85
Dave Tecson	Independent	2,168	0.72
Jorge Tamondong	PGRP	837	0.28
Total		286,347	100.00

=== 5th provincial district ===
Pangasinan's 5th provincial district consists of the same area as Pangasinan's 5th legislative district. Two board members are elected from this provincial district.

==== Results ====
Candidate	Party	Votes	%
Chinky Perez (incumbent)	API	161,522	52.66
Louie Sison (incumbent)	API	142,302	46.39
Jesus Basco	Lakas-CMD	85,665	27.93
Jen Gandia Garcia	Lakas-CMD	59,244	19.32
Total		448,733	100.00

=== 6th provincial district ===
Pangasinan's 6th provincial district consists of the same area as Pangasinan's 6th legislative district. Two board members are elected from this provincial district.

==== Results ====
Candidate	Party	Votes	%
Noel Bince (incumbent)	API	130,239	47.56
Salvador Perez Jr. (incumbent)	API	115,559	42.20
Rebecca Saldivar	Nacionalista Party	78,073	28.51
Ranjit Shahani	Lakas-CMD	35,123	12.83
Ronald Fonacier	Independent	31,505	11.50
Reynaldo Sebastian	Independent	5,153	1.88
Total		395,652	100.00

== House of Representatives Elections ==
=== 1st District ===
Arthur Celeste runs for Congressman after being defeated in the 2019 Pangasinan Gubenatorial Election.

==== Results ====
Candidate	Party	Votes	%
Arthur Celeste	Nacionalista	155,372	65.19
Oscar Orbos	Aksyon	82,983	34.81
Total		238,355	100.00
Valid votes		238,355	93.70
Invalid/blank votes		16,023	6.30
Total votes		254,378	100.00
Registered voters/turnout		294,221	86.46
Nacionalista hold			

==== Results per city/municipality ====
City/municipality	Arthur Celeste		Oscar Orbos	
City/municipality	Votes	%	Votes	%
Agno	8,146	48.9	8,495	51.0
Alaminos City	34,381	67.1	16,824	32.9
Anda	13,759	64.3	7,655	35.7
Bani	16,790	64.0	9,426	36.0
Bolinao	32,419	82.6	6,829	17.4
Burgos	6,862	61.8	4,248	38.2
Dasol	12,030	63.8	6,833	36.2
Infanta	9,564	68.8	4,345	31.2
Mabini	8,401	57.9	6,115	42.1
Sual	13,020	51.6	12,213	48.4
Total	155,372	65.2	82,983	34.8

First District Results

Vote %

10–20%
30–40%
40–50%
50–60%
60–70%
80–90%

=== 2nd District ===
Mark Cojuangco runs for election seeking to unseat incumbent Congressman Jumel Espino. Reelectionist Rep. Jumel Espino lost to former Rep. Mark Cojuangco by almost 160,000 votes. It was Espino Family's first defeat in their 20-year political career.

==== Results ====
Candidate	Party	Votes	%
Mark Cojuangco	NPC	152,077	51.73
Jumel Espino	PDP-Laban	137,431	46.75
Roberto Merrera Jr.	PPM	4,454	1.52
Total		293,962	100.00
Valid votes		293,962	95.27
Invalid/blank votes		14,588	4.73
Total votes		308,550	100.00
Registered voters/turnout		351,684	87.74
NPC gain from PDP-Laban			

==== Results per city/municipality ====
City/municipality	Mark Cojuangco		Jumel Espino		Roberto Merrera Jr.	
City/municipality	Votes	%	Votes	%	Votes	%
Aguilar	13,198	52.5	11,804	46.9	143	0.6
Basista	9,700	46.1	11,212	53.3	107	0.5
Binmaley	25,197	49.8	22,453	44.4	2,969	5.9
Bugallon	19,916	47.6	21,802	52.1	148	0.4
Labrador	10,396	65.4	5,404	34.0	88	0.6
Lingayen	32,551	53.4	27,914	45.9	414	0.7
Mangatarem	27,675	61.3	17,120	37.9	335	0.7
Urbiztondo	13,444	40.2	19,722	59.0	250	0.7
Total	152,077	51.7	137,431	46.8	4,454	1.5

Second District Results

Vote %

0–10%
30–40%
40–50%
50–60%
60–70%

=== 3rd District ===
Rachel Arenas runs for election to replace her mother, former Congresswoman Baby Arenas.

==== Results ====
Candidate	Party	Votes	%
Rachel Baby Arenas	PDP-Laban	311,862	90.47
Generoso Mamaril Jr.	Partido Pilipino sa Pagbabago	26,555	7.70
Teodoro Cabral	PPM	6,302	1.83
Total		344,719	100.00
Valid votes		344,719	90.37
Invalid/blank votes		36,733	9.63
Total votes		381,452	100.00
Registered voters/turnout		441,956	86.31
PDP-Laban hold			

==== Results per city/municipality ====
City/municipality	Rachel "Baby" Arenas		Generoso Mamaril Jr.		Teodoro Cabral	
City/municipality	Votes	%	Votes	%	Votes	%
Bayambang	60,932	93.9	2,658	4.1	1,308	2.0
Calasiao	47,472	90.4	3,985	7.6	1,065	2.0
San Carlos City	85,563	90.9	6,764	7.2	1,806	1.9
Malasiqui	60,109	87.7	7,699	11.2	755	1.1
Mapandan	18,315	89.8	1,584	7.8	502	2.5
Santa Barbara	85,563	90.9	3,865	8.7	866	2.0
Total	311,862	90.5	26,555	7.7	6,302	1.8

Third District Results

Vote %

0–10%
10–20%
80–90%
90–100%

=== 4th District ===
Christopher De Venecia runs for his 3rd and Last term as Congressman.

==== Results ====
Candidate	Party	Votes	%
Toff De Venecia	Lakas-CMD	213,020	80.03
Alipio Fernandez	Independent	53,162	19.97
Total		266,182	100.00
Valid votes		266,182	89.04
Invalid/blank votes		32,769	10.96
Total votes		298,951	100.00
Registered voters/turnout		340,564	87.78
Lakas-CMD hold			

==== Results per city/municipality ====
City/municipality	Toff de Venecia		Alipio Fernandez	
City/municipality	Votes	%	Votes	%
Dagupan City	76,740	69.5	33,621	30.5
Manaoag	31,455	87.6	4,440	12.4
Mangaldan	50,657	90.8	5,108	9.2
San Fabian	34,718	82.2	7,508	17.8
San Jacinto	19,450	88.7	2,485	11.3
Total	213,020	80.0	53,162	20.0

Fourth District Results

Vote %

0–10%
10–20%
30–40%
60–70%
80–90%
90–100%

=== 5th District ===
Ramon Guico Jr. runs for election to replace his son Ramon Guico III who ran for Governor.

==== Results ====
Candidate	Party	Votes	%
Ramon Guico Jr.	Lakas-CMD	166,921	59.40
Niño Arbodela	PDP-Laban	114,079	40.60
Total		281,000	100.00
Valid votes		281,000	91.89
Invalid/blank votes		24,796	8.11
Total votes		305,796	100.00
Registered voters/turnout		352,414	86.77
Lakas-CMD hold			

==== Results per city/municipality ====
City/municipality	Ramon Guico, Jr.		Niño Abordela	
City/municipality	Votes	%	Votes	%
Alcala	12,410	49.9	12,472	50.1
Bautista	6,241	36.7	10,754	63.3
Binalonan	24,662	78.8	6,636	21.2
Laoac	11,048	59.3	7,594	40.7
Pozorrubio	27,092	66.5	13,638	33.5
Santo Tomas	5,179	64.4	2,869	35.6
Sison	20,748	78.9	5,554	21.1
Urdaneta City	43,556	55.9	34,373	44.1
Villasis	15,985	44.2	20,189	55.8
Total	166,921	59.4	114,079	40.6

Fifth District Results

Vote %

20–30%
30–40%
40–50%
50–60%
60–70%
70–80%

=== 6th District ===
Marlyn Primicias-Agabas runs for Congresswoman after being term limited last election.

==== Results ====
Candidate	Party	Votes	%
Marlyn Primicias-Agabas	PDP-Laban	233,397	92.70
Pilo Villamar	KBL	18,393	7.30
Total		251,790	100.00
Valid votes		251,790	92.27
Invalid/blank votes		21,104	7.73
Total votes		272,894	100.00
Registered voters/turnout		316,097	86.33
PDP-Laban gain from NPC			

==== Results per city/municipality ====
City/municipality	Marlyn Primicias-Agabas		Pilo Villamar	
City/municipality	Votes	%	Votes	%
Asingan	29,969	93.3	1,796	5.7
Balungao	15,590	94.2	957	5.8
Natividad	13,788	94.1	861	5.9
Rosales	34,150	93.2	2,473	6.8
San Manuel	22,777	90.0	2,541	10.0
San Nicolas	13,788	94.1	861	5.9
San Quintin	18,682	94.5	1,090	5.5
Santa Maria	18,031	95.4	860	4.6
Tayug	20,752	86.2	3,309	13.8
Umingan	40,486	95.2	2,047	4.8
Total	233,397	92.7	18,393	7.3

Sixth District Results

Vote %

0–10%
10–20%
80–90%
90–100%

== City elections ==
=== Alaminos ===
Candidate	Party	Votes	%
Bryan Celeste	Nacionalista Party	28,696	55.76
Jing Aquino	API	22,766	44.24
Total		51,462	100.00
Valid votes		51,462	96.55
Invalid/blank votes		1,837	3.45
Total votes		53,299	100.00
Registered voters/turnout		62,546	85.22

=== Dagupan ===
Former mayor Belen Fernandez successfully staged her comeback after her 2019 loss by winning against incumbent Dagupan City Mayor Marc Brian Lim.

Fernandez bagged 67,499 votes against Lim's 53,042 votes. She had received the backing of the religious group Iglesia ni Cristo.

Candidate	Party	Votes	%
Belen Fernandez	Aksyon	67,499	55.80
Bryan Lim	Nacionalista Party	53,042	43.85
Juan Siapno Jr.	Independent	417	0.34
Total		120,958	100.00
Valid votes		120,958	97.31
Invalid/blank votes		3,339	2.69
Total votes		124,297	100.00
Registered voters/turnout		138,721	89.60

=== San Carlos ===
Candidate	Party	Votes	%
Ayoy Resuello	API	51,998	51.47
Jonathan Lomboy	NPC	38,765	38.37
Galila Soriano	Lakas-CMD	10,254	10.15
Total		101,017	100.00
Valid votes		101,017	96.64
Invalid/blank votes		3,510	3.36
Total votes		104,527	100.00
Registered voters/turnout		126,283	82.77

=== Urdaneta ===
Candidate	Party	Votes	%
Rammy Parayno	Lakas-CMD	53,900	65.92
Bobom Perez	Independent	27,865	34.08
Total		81,765	100.00
Valid votes		81,765	96.35
Invalid/blank votes		3,098	3.65
Total votes		84,863	100.00
Registered voters/turnout		95,971	88.43

== Municipal Elections ==
=== 1st District ===
- City: Alaminos City
- Municipalities: Agno, Anda, Bani, Bolinao, Burgos, Dasol, Infanta, Mabini, Sual

Agno

Candidate	Party	Votes	%
Gualberto Sison	API	8,952	52.38
Noli Celeste	Nacionalista Party	8,139	47.62
Total		17,091	100.00

Anda

Candidate	Party	Votes	%
Joganie Rarang	Nacionalista Party	13,180	59.70
Dante De Castro	API	4,870	22.06
Gilbert Sosa	Reform PH Party	4,027	18.24
Total		22,077	100.00

Bani

Candidate	Party	Votes	%
Boying Palafox	Nacionalista Party	15,582	59.08
JP Navarro	API	9,015	34.18
Artemio Amon	NPC	1,778	6.74
Total		26,375	100.00

Bolinao

Candidate	Party	Votes	%
Alfon Celeste	Nacionalista Party	31,259	82.01
Apin Cacho	API	6,042	15.85
Paul Tucay	PFP	817	2.14
Total		38,118	100.00

Burgos

Candidate	Party	Votes	%
Allan Valenzuela	API	5,991	51.48
Ronald Ngayawan	Nacionalista Party	5,606	48.17
Alberto Bona	Independent	41	0.35
Total		11,638	100.00

Dasol

Candidate	Party	Votes	%
Sadong Bernal	Nacionalista Party	11,223	56.38
Noel Nacar	PDP-Laban	8,682	43.62
Total		19,905	100.00

Infanta

Candidate	Party	Votes	%
Marvin Martinzez	Nacionalista Party	11,735	81.45
Crispin Millora	PDP-Laban	2,672	18.55
Total		14,407	100.00

Mabini

Candidate	Party	Votes	%
Colin Reyes	Nacionalista Party	7,552	49.93
Ariel De Guzman	API	7,525	49.75
Loreto Obice	PGRP	49	0.32
Total		15,126	100.00

Sual

Candidate	Party	Votes	%
Dong Calugay	API	14,735	54.86
Boying Celeste	Nacionalista Party	12,125	45.14
Total		26,860	100.00

=== 2nd District ===
Municipalities: Aguilar, Basista, Binmaley, Bugallon, Labrador, Lingayen, Mangatarem, Urbiztondo

Aguilar

Candidate	Party	Votes	%
Kristal Soriano	API	13,399	52.46
Vil Sagles	NUP	12,143	47.54
Total		25,542	100.00

Basista

Candidate	Party	Votes	%
Jr Resuello	API	15,322	71.79
Boy Tagum	NPC	6,021	28.21
Total		21,343	100.00

Binmaley

Candidate	Party	Votes	%
Pedro Merrera	Partido Pederal ng Maharlika	24,379	47.26
Jonas Rosario	PDP-Laban	18,658	36.17
Edgar Mamenta	Nacionalista Party	8,005	15.52
Vincent Thomas Castro	Independent	542	1.05
Total		51,584	100.00

Bugallon

Candidate	Party	Votes	%
Priscilla Espino	API	21,604	52.29
Ric Orduña	Nationalist People's Coalition	19,712	47.71
Total		41,316	100.00

Labrador

Candidate	Party	Votes	%
Ernesto Acain	NUP	8,571	52.86
Domy Arenas	API	7,550	46.56
Titoy Mislang	PROMDI	95	0.59
Total		16,216	100.00

Lingayen

Candidate	Party	Votes	%
Leopoldo Bataoil	NUP	31,194	51.33
Iday Castañeda	NPC	29,579	48.67
Total		60,773	100.00

Mangatarem

Candidate	Party	Votes	%
Balong Ventenilla	API	39,917	100.00
Total		39,917	100.00

Urbiztondo

Candidate	Party	Votes	%
Moding Operania	API	18,971	55.50
Martin Sison	NPC	14,821	43.36
Mark Baniqued	PDP-Laban	391	1.14
Total		34,183	100.00

=== 3rd District ===
- City: San Carlos City
- Municipalities: Bayambang, Calasiao, Malasiqui, Mapandan, Santa Barbara

Bayambang

Candidate	Party	Votes	%
Niña Jose Quiambao	Nacionalista Party	41,685	59.90
Ricardo Camacho	API	27,373	39.34
Chato Junio	PFP	385	0.55
Ramon Matabang	PROMDI	90	0.13
Alven Ignas	Independent	53	0.08
Total		69,586	100.00

Calasiao

Candidate	Party	Votes	%
Mamilyn Caramat	Nacionalista Party	29,735	51.83
Joseph Arman Bauzon	API	27,630	48.17
Total		57,365	100.00

Malasiqui

Candidate	Party	Votes	%
Noel Geslani	API	26,639	37.15
Arman Domantay	NPC	17,454	24.34
Crispin Capua	PROMDI	15,236	21.25
Jevie De Guzman	NUP	9,611	13.40
Liza Gural	Partido Pederal ng Maharlika	1,311	1.83
Ankel Sam Palangas	Independent	858	1.20
Arnel Dignomo	PDP-Laban	309	0.43
Rodolfo Estrada Jr.	Independent	286	0.40
Total		71,704	100.00

Mapandan

Candidate	Party	Votes	%
Karl Christian Vega	API	13,580	60.26
Dooy Penuliar	NPC	8,956	39.74
Total		22,536	100.00

Santa Barbara

Candidate	Party	Votes	%
Carlito Zaplan	API	26,156	54.11
Joel Delos Santos	NPC	22,180	45.89
Total		48,336	100.00

=== 4th District ===
- City: Dagupan City
- Municipalities: Manaoag, Mangaldan, San Fabian, San Jacinto

Manaoag

Candidate	Party	Votes	%
Ming Rosario	API	16,117	40.45
Domyciano Ching	PROMDI	15,961	40.05
Ramon Bautista Jr.	Nacionalista Party	7,681	19.28
Mariano Soriano Jr.	Independent	89	0.22
Total		39,848	100.00

Mangaldan

Candidate	Party	Votes	%
Bona De Vera-Parayno	PDP-Laban	28,466	48.50
Marilyn Lambino	Lakas-CMD	18,276	31.14
Arturo Lomibao	PRP	11,948	20.36
Total		58,690	100.00

San Fabian

Candidate	Party	Votes	%
Marlyn Agbayani	API	22,336	48.05
Riby Villegas	Nacionalista Party	15,419	33.17
Juvenal Azurin	Aksyon	8,731	18.78
Total		46,486	100.00

San Jacinto

Candidate	Party	Votes	%
Leo De Vera	API	14,381	59.26
Apples Abacar	Nacionalista Party	6,124	25.23
Hilario De Guzman Jr.	Aksyon	3,741	15.41
Coach Saringan	Independent	23	0.09
Total		24,269	100.00

=== 5th District ===
- City: Urdaneta City
- Municipalities: Alcala, Bautista, Binalonan, Laoac, Pozorrubio, Santo Tomas, Sison, Villasis

Alcala

Candidate	Party	Votes	%
Jojo Callejo	API	19,301	76.84
Pao Mencias	KBL	4,739	18.87
Manuel Liberato	Reporma	1,079	4.30
Total		25,119	100.00

Bautista

Candidate	Party	Votes	%
Joseph Espino	API	11,586	63.03
Eduardo Ong	NPC	6,252	34.01
Roberto Mosuela	PROMDI	543	2.95
Total		18,381	100.00

Binalonan

Candidate	Party	Votes	%
Ramon Ronald Guico IV	Lakas-CMD	20,081	63.66
Ryan Gotoc	API	9,213	29.21
Josie Caburnay	PROMDI	1,707	5.41
Eduardo Boado	KBL	543	1.72
Total		31,544	100.00

Laoac

Candidate	Party	Votes	%
Ricardo Balderas	API	15,156	79.71
Roger Godoy	Lakas-CMD	3,859	20.29
Total		19,015	100.00

Pozorrubio

Candidate	Party	Votes	%
Kelvin Chan	Lakas-CMD	25,402	60.75
Freddie Villanueva	API	16,133	38.58
Lamberto Sandoc	Independent	279	0.67
Total		41,814	100.00

Santo Tomas

Candidate	Party	Votes	%
Dickerson Villar	API	5,063	61.94
Nela Mariñas	Lakas-CMD	2,790	34.13
Arcadio Ramos	Reporma	321	3.93
Total		8,174	100.00

Sison

Candidate	Party	Votes	%
Danilo Uy	Nacionalista Party	18,735	67.88
Edgar Jovenal	API	8,866	32.12
Total		27,601	100.00

Villasis

Candidate	Party	Votes	%
Nato Abrenica	API	22,062	60.51
Isagani Rabe	Independent	9,989	27.40
Joe Ordoño	Independent	4,407	12.09
Total		36,458	100.00

=== 6th District ===
- Municipalities: Asingan, Balungao, Natividad, Rosales, San Manuel, San Nicolas, San Quintin, Santa Maria, Tayug, Umingan

Asingan

Candidate	Party	Votes	%
Carlos Lopez Jr.	NPC	27,743	100.00
Total		27,743	100.00

Balungao

Candidate	Party	Votes	%
Riza Peralta	API	8,943	51.09
Jojo Peralta	Lakas-CMD	8,563	48.91
Total		17,506	100.00

Natividad

Candidate	Party	Votes	%
Ruby Rafael	NPC	7,558	49.74
Keith De Guzman	API	7,505	49.39
Rudy Rafael	Independent	132	0.87
Total		15,195	100.00

Rosales

Candidate	Party	Votes	%
Liam Cezar	NPC	19,555	50.61
Patrick Revita	API	14,700	38.05
Romulo Tagalicud	KBL	4,128	10.68
Romulo Tagalicud	Independent	253	0.65
Total		38,636	100.00

San Manuel

Candidate	Party	Votes	%
Kenneth Marco Perez	NPC	22,318	87.77
Neil Ramos	PROMDI	2,798	11.00
Oniel Ramos	Independent	313	1.23
Total		25,429	100.00

San Nicolas

Candidate	Party	Votes	%
Alicia Primicias	PDP-Laban	16,285	73.25
Leoncio Saldivar Jr.	PRP	5,947	26.75
Total		22,232	100.00

San Quintin

Candidate	Party	Votes	%
Florence Tiu	Nacionalista Party	10,431	51.03
Nerio Ignacio	KBL	10,010	48.97
Total		20,441	100.00

Santa Maria

Candidate	Party	Votes	%
Julius Ramos	NPC	10,563	54.11
Rex Navarrete	API	8,058	41.27
Condrado Ignacio	PFP	764	3.91
Johnny Madarang	Independent	104	0.53
Robin Carpo	Independent	34	0.17
Total		19,523	100.00

Tayug

Candidate	Party	Votes	%
Tyrone Ty Agabas	NPC	16,060	63.98
Carlos Trece Mapili	Independent	8,975	35.76
Richard Miranda	Independent	66	0.26
Total		25,101	100.00

Umingan

Candidate	Party	Votes	%
Michael Carleone Cruz	Nacionalista Party	22,075	49.68
Emil Trinidad	API	21,905	49.30
Anacleto Payoyo Jr.	Independent	451	1.02
Total		44,431	100.00

== See also ==
- 2022 Philippine presidential election in Pangasinan
