= 2025 Pangasinan local elections =

- May 12, 2025
- Registered: 2,156,306
- Turnout: 86.76% (▼0.42 pp)
- Gubernatorial election
- Registered: 2,011,825 (Note: Excluding Dagupan City)
- Turnout: 86.70% (▲0.01 pp)
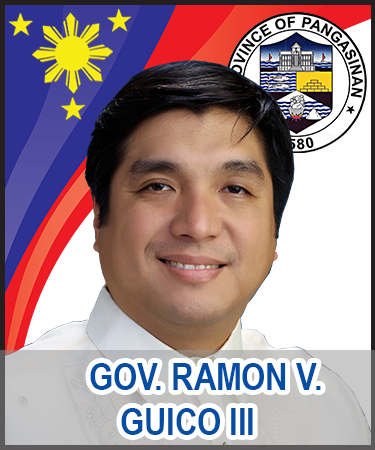

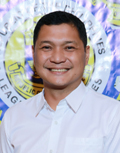
Candidate	Ramon Guico III	Amado Espino III
Party	Nacionalista	API
Running mate	Mark Lambino	Noel Nacar
Popular vote	881,307	784,470
Percentage	52.91%	47.09%
Governor before election
Ramon Guico III
Nacionalista
Elected Governor
Ramon Guico III
Nacionalista
- Vice gubernatorial election
- Registered: 2,011,825
- Turnout: 69.96%
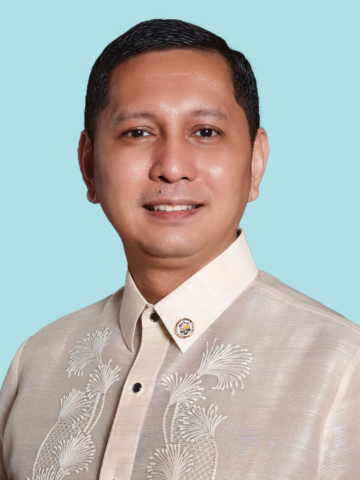

Candidate	Mark Lambino	Noel Nacar
Party	Lakas	API
Popular vote	1,022,160	385,316
Percentage	72.62%	27.38%
Vice governor before election
Mark Lambino
Lakas
Elected Vice governor
Mark Lambino
Lakas

Local elections were held in the province of Pangasinan on May 12, 2025, as part of the 2025 Philippine general election. Pangasinan voters will elect a governor, a vice governor, 6 members of the House of Representatives that will represent the 6 congressional districts of the province, and 12 out of 15 members of the Pangasinan Provincial Board. The officials elected will assume their respective offices on June 30, 2025, for a three-year-long term.

Incumbent Governor Ramon Guico III, who first won the governorship in 2022, secured a second term by defeating former governor Amado Espino III of the Abante Pangasinan-Ilokano Party (API) by a vote margin of 5.81%. His running mate, Vice Governor Mark Ronald Lambino, was also re-elected to a third term, surpassing one million votes and defeating Noel Nacar by a commanding margin of over 72% of the valid votes cast.

In the provincial board elections, a total of nine board members were re-elected, mostly from Governor Guico's ticket, with the Nacionalista Party winning seven of the twelve elected seats and becoming the largest party in the provincial board. The API, which had dominated the board following the 2022 elections, was reduced to a single seat in the 5th district.

== Background ==
In the 2022 local elections, the newly formed API party dominated the provincial board elections, winning 8 of the 12 seats in the provincial board. Incumbent Governor Amado Espino III lost re-election to Ramon Guico III, a congressman representing the 5th congressional district of the province, by a margin of 187,807 votes or 12 percentage points.

On October 5, 2024, Espino, alongside his running mate, Former Dasol mayor Noel Nacar, filed their certificate of candidacies at the COMELEC Office of the Provincial Election Supervisor at the People's Astrodome. This was the first election in which the candidates were the same as those who ran for governor in the previous election.

== Electoral system ==
Local elections in the Philippines are held every second Monday of May starting in 1992 and every three years thereafter. Single-seat positions such as the governor, vice governor, and House representatives, are elected via first-past-the-post-voting, a voting system where the candidate with the most votes wins, even without a majority. The governor and vice governor are elected by the province at-large, while the House representative and provincial board members are elected per district.

Provincial board elections are done via plurality block voting; Pangsinan is divided into six districts, with each district sending two board members. There are three other ex officio seats: the president of the Philippine Councilors’ League, the president of the Association of Barangay Captains, and the president of the Sangguniang Kabataan (SK) Provincial Federation.

== Campaign ==
=== Security concerns and preparation ===
Pangasinan police increased their security measures ahead of the 2025 elections, assigning 2,408 police officers to safeguard 1,204 voting centers and 2,869 automatic counting machines (ACMs). The deployment is intended to ensure safe and orderly voting operations in the province.

The Commission on Elections in Pangasinan removed 22,353 non-compliant campaign posters during Oplan Baklas (nationwide poster removal operation) as of March 28, 2025. These materials include posters, billboards, or tarpaulins that exceed size limits and those located outside the designated common poster areas.

The localities of Aguilar, Binmaley, Malasiqui, Mangaldan, San Quintin, Sual, Urdaneta, and Dagupan City were identified as under "areas of concern" (yellow category) due to intense political rivalries and past election-related incidents.

=== Vote buying ===
In May 2025, congressional candidate Gilbert Estrella was implicated in reports of widespread vote-buying in Pangasinan's 6th district. Representative Marlyn Primicias-Agabas asked the Commission on Elections (COMELEC) and the Philippine National Police to investigate claims that Estrella's supporters distributed about ₱3,000 per voter in the municipalities of Rosales, Balungao, and Asingan.

=== Shootings ===
On December 7, 2024, Ponciano Onia Jr., a reelectionist councilor of Umingan and concurrent national president of Abono Partylist, was shot dead in an ambush by unidentified gunmen while driving.

== Provincial offices ==
=== Governor ===
Municipal and city results Guico: 50-60%; 60-70%; 70-80%; 80-90%; Espino: 50-60%; 60-70%; 70-80%

Barangay results Guico: 50-60% 60-70% 70-80% 80-90% 90-100%; Espino: 50-60% 60-70% 70-80% 80-90%

Municipal and city flips Nacionalista: Nacionalista hold Nacionalista gain; API: API hold API gain

Guico, who has been serving as the governor of the province since 2022, was challenged by his predecessor, Amado Espino III, who as governor from 2016 until 2022.

==== Candidates ====
- Ramon Guico III (Nacionalista), incumbent governor since 2022
- Amado Espino III (API), former governor from 2016–2022

==== Results ====
2025 Pangasinan gubernatorial election
Party	Candidate	Votes	%	±%
Nacionalista	Ramon Guico III	881,307	52.91%	−2.70
API	Amado Espino III	784,470	47.09%	+3.29
Total votes		1,665,777	100.00%	N/A

===== By municipality and city =====
Results by municipality and city
City/Municipality	Ramon Guico III Nacionalista		Amado Espino III API		Margin		Total
City/Municipality	#	%	#	%	#	%	Total
Agno	9,455	54.87%	7,777	45.13%	1,678	9.74%	17,232
Aguilar	16,594	63.12%	9,696	36.88%	6,898	26.24%	26,290
Alaminos City	28,751	59.59%	19,494	40.41%	9,257	19.19%	48,245
Alcala	17,950	69.21%	7,985	30.79%	9,965	38.42%	25,935
Anda	9,906	48.25%	10,626	51.75%	-720	-3.51%	20,532
Asingan	13,853	40.30%	20,519	59.70%	-6,666	-19.39%	34,372
Balungao	9,536	51.48%	8,987	48.52%	549	2.96%	18,523
Bani	17,360	67.20%	8,475	32.80%	8,885	34.39%	25,835
Basista	10,311	46.44%	11,892	53.56%	-1,581	-7.12%	22,203
Bautista	5,507	28.43%	13,864	71.57%	-8,357	-43.14%	19,371
Bayambang	24,916	38.13%	40,431	61.87%	-15,515	-23.74%	65,347
Binalonan	27,455	85.42%	4,688	14.58%	22,767	70.83%	32,143
Binmaley	28,031	53.69%	24,176	46.31%	3,855	7.38%	52,207
Bolinao	32,151	82.20%	6,964	17.80%	25,187	64.39%	39,115
Bugallon	22,090	47.63%	24,291	52.37%	-2,201	-4.75%	46,381
Burgos	5,231	44.68%	6,477	55.32%	-1,246	-10.64%	11,708
Calasiao	22,039	39.53%	33,714	60.47%	-11,675	-20.94%	55,753
Dasol	11,109	57.14%	8,332	42.86%	2,777	14.28%	19,441
Infanta	7,161	48.43%	7,625	51.57%	-464	-3.14%	14,786
Labrador	11,905	70.63%	4,951	29.37%	6,954	41.26%	16,856
Laoac	14,358	73.59%	5,152	26.41%	9,206	47.19%	19,510
Lingayen	36,026	58.39%	25,669	41.61%	10,357	16.79%	61,695
Mabini	8,291	54.72%	6,861	45.28%	1,430	9.44%	15,152
Malasiqui	32,005	43.00%	42,423	57.00%	-10,418	-14.00%	74,428
Manaoag	22,004	54.38%	18,459	45.62%	3,545	8.76%	40,463
Mangaldan	28,525	48.49%	30,297	51.51%	-1,772	-3.01%	58,822
Mangatarem	25,307	55.72%	20,109	44.28%	5,198	11.45%	45,416
Mapandan	9,901	42.46%	13,419	57.54%	-3,518	-15.09%	23,320
Natividad	7,368	46.60%	8,443	53.40%	-1,075	-6.80%	15,811
Pozorrubio	25,225	60.92%	16,179	39.08%	9,046	21.85%	41,404
Rosales	26,609	65.47%	14,035	34.53%	12,574	30.94%	40,644
San Carlos City	42,277	40.32%	62,580	59.68%	-20,303	-19.36%	104,857
San Fabian	28,308	63.82%	16,046	36.18%	12,262	27.65%	44,354
San Jacinto	8,975	37.08%	15,228	62.92%	-6,253	-25.84%	24,203
San Manuel	18,688	67.53%	8,987	32.47%	9,701	35.05%	27,675
San Nicolas	13,760	58.30%	9,843	41.70%	3,917	16.60%	23,603
San Quintin	12,257	56.55%	9,416	43.45%	2,841	13.11%	21,673
Santa Barbara	25,054	50.05%	25,002	49.95%	52	0.10%	50,056
Santa Maria	9,828	48.06%	10,621	51.94%	-793	-3.88%	20,449
Santo Tomas	6,443	76.09%	2,025	23.91%	4,418	52.17%	8,468
Sison	18,973	68.98%	8,532	31.02%	10,441	37.96%	27,505
Sual	11,980	42.71%	16,068	57.29%	-4,088	-14.58%	28,048
Tayug	14,281	52.54%	12,901	47.46%	1,380	5.08%	27,182
Umingan	28,899	61.38%	18,180	38.62%	10,719	22.77%	47,079
Urbiztondo	16,900	47.32%	18,811	52.68%	-1,911	-5.35%	35,711
Urdaneta City	39,690	45.20%	48,122	54.80%	-8,432	-9.60%	87,812
Villasis	18,064	47.34%	20,098	52.66%	-2,034	-5.33%	38,162
Totals	881,307	52.91%	784,470	47.09%	96,837	5.81%	1,665,777

=== Vice governor ===
Municipal and city results Lambino: 50-60% 60-70% 70-80% 80-90% 90-100%; Nacar: 50-60%

Barangay results Lambino: 50-60% 60-70% 70-80% 80-90% 90-100%; Nacar: 50-60% 60-70% 70-80%

Municipal and city flips Lakas: Lakas Hold Lakas Gain; API: API Hold API Gain

Mark Lambino is the incumbent vice governor serving since 2019. He was challenged by former Dasol mayor Noel Nacar. Lambino was re-elected for a third consecutive term.

==== Candidates ====
- Mark Lambino (Lakas), incumbent vice governor since 2019
- Noel Nacar (API), former mayor of Dasol from 2007–2016 and 2019–2022

==== Results ====
2025 Pangasinan vice gubernatorial election
Party	Candidate	Votes	%	±%
Lakas	Mark Lambino	1,022,160	72.62%	+11.17
API	Noel Nacar	385,316	27.38%	−11.17
Total votes		1,407,476	100.00%	N/A

===== By municipality and city =====
Results by municipality and city
City/Municipality	Mark Lambino Lakas		Noel Nacar API		Margin		Total
City/Municipality	#	%	#	%	#	%	Total
Agno	9,704	65.12%	5,198	34.88%	4,506	30.24%	14,902
Aguilar	17,852	80.30%	4,381	19.70%	13,471	60.59%	22,233
Alaminos City	32,884	77.25%	9,685	22.75%	23,199	54.50%	42,569
Alcala	17,348	80.94%	4,085	19.06%	13,263	61.88%	21,433
Anda	13,400	77.49%	3,893	22.51%	9,507	54.98%	17,293
Asingan	19,113	71.62%	7,573	28.38%	11,540	43.24%	26,686
Balungao	9,855	64.88%	5,335	35.12%	4,520	29.76%	15,190
Bani	18,221	79.76%	4,624	20.24%	13,597	59.52%	22,845
Basista	12,726	69.88%	5,484	30.12%	7,242	39.77%	18,210
Bautista	7,335	44.28%	9,231	55.72%	-1,896	-11.45%	16,566
Bayambang	39,308	70.64%	16,338	29.36%	22,970	41.28%	55,646
Binalonan	23,261	87.14%	3,433	12.86%	19,828	74.28%	26,694
Binmaley	31,546	69.71%	13,705	30.29%	17,841	39.43%	45,251
Bolinao	31,672	90.46%	3,340	9.54%	28,332	80.92%	35,012
Bugallon	26,401	66.22%	13,467	33.78%	12,934	32.44%	39,868
Burgos	4,263	40.46%	6,273	59.54%	-2,010	-19.08%	10,536
Calasiao	30,235	65.08%	16,220	34.92%	14,015	30.17%	46,455
Dasol	7,888	40.66%	11,510	59.34%	-3,622	-18.67%	19,398
Infanta	6,926	54.19%	5,855	45.81%	1,071	8.38%	12,781
Labrador	10,103	73.80%	3,587	26.20%	6,516	47.60%	13,690
Laoac	12,181	75.68%	3,914	24.32%	8,267	51.36%	16,095
Lingayen	42,011	77.09%	12,486	22.91%	29,525	54.18%	54,497
Mabini	8,901	65.40%	4,710	34.60%	4,191	30.79%	13,611
Malasiqui	48,412	74.87%	16,247	25.13%	32,165	49.75%	64,659
Manaoag	27,482	81.47%	6,251	18.53%	21,231	62.94%	33,733
Mangaldan	41,519	77.78%	11,863	22.22%	29,656	55.55%	53,382
Mangatarem	30,858	80.16%	7,639	19.84%	23,219	60.31%	38,497
Mapandan	14,434	72.41%	5,500	27.59%	8,934	44.82%	19,934
Natividad	8,316	63.38%	4,804	36.62%	3,512	26.77%	13,120
Pozorrubio	28,080	81.11%	6,538	18.89%	21,542	62.23%	34,618
Rosales	25,451	79.33%	6,633	20.67%	18,818	58.65%	32,084
San Carlos City	67,244	75.06%	22,345	24.94%	44,899	50.12%	89,589
San Fabian	28,856	80.22%	7,116	19.78%	21,740	60.44%	35,972
San Jacinto	14,206	71.13%	5,765	28.87%	8,441	42.27%	19,971
San Manuel	17,819	81.76%	3,976	18.24%	13,843	63.51%	21,795
San Nicolas	13,468	72.49%	5,110	27.51%	8,358	44.99%	18,578
San Quintin	13,301	77.34%	3,898	22.66%	9,403	54.67%	17,199
Santa Barbara	30,239	72.05%	11,732	27.95%	18,507	44.09%	41,971
Santa Maria	11,821	71.50%	4,713	28.50%	7,108	42.99%	16,534
Santo Tomas	5,906	83.03%	1,207	16.97%	4,699	66.06%	7,113
Sison	16,781	75.35%	5,489	24.65%	11,292	50.70%	22,270
Sual	13,907	57.30%	10,364	42.70%	3,543	14.60%	24,271
Tayug	15,493	72.56%	5,858	27.44%	9,635	45.13%	21,351
Umingan	28,276	76.52%	8,675	23.48%	19,601	53.05%	36,951
Urbiztondo	21,111	70.51%	8,831	29.49%	12,280	41.01%	29,942
Urdaneta City	43,981	58.60%	31,070	41.40%	12,911	17.20%	75,051
Villasis	22,065	70.20%	9,365	29.80%	12,700	40.41%	31,430
Totals	1,022,160	72.62%	385,316	27.38%	636,844	45.25%	1,407,476

== Provincial board ==
The ruling API party suffered significant losses in the provincial board elections, losing 7 seats compared to its previous composition of 8 seats. Meanwhile, the Nacionalista Party made substantial gains, winning 5 additional seats and increasing its total representation to 7 seats. As a result, the Nacionalista Party secured majority control of the provincial Board, shifting the balance of power in the provincial legislature.

=== Results ===
2025 Pangasinan provincial board election
Party	Votes	Percentage	Seats	Seat change
Nacionalista	1,178,852	44.64%	7	▲5
API	484,918	18.36%	1	▼7
NPC	424,144	16.06%	1	▼1
Lakas	264,370	10.01%	1	▲1
Independents	198,946	7.53%	1	▲1
Liberal	89,563	3.39%	1	New
Totals	2,640,793	100.00%	12	—

==== Results summary by district ====
‡ - Incumbent term-limited

District	Incumbents	Party	Elected board members	Party
1st	Napoleon Fontelera Jr.	Nacionalista	Apolonia Bacay	Nacionalista
1st	Apolonia Bacay	Nacionalista	Napoleon Fontelera Jr.	Nacionalista
2nd	Philip Theodore Cruz	NPC	Philip Theodore Cruz	NPC
2nd	Haidee Pacheco	API	Haidee Pacheco	Nacionalista
3rd	Shiela Baniqued	API	Shiela Baniqued	Nacionalista
3rd	Vici Ventanilla	NPC	Vici Ventanilla	Nacionalista
4th	Noy De Guzman	API	Noy De Guzman	Nacionalista
4th	Jerry Rosario	API	Jerry Rosario	Nacionalista
5th	Chinky Perez‡	API	Rose Apaga	API
5th	Louie Sison	API	Louie Sison	Lakas
6th	Noel Bince	API	Noel Bince	Independent
6th	Salvador Perez Jr.‡	API	Ranjit Shahani	Liberal

==== 1st district ====
2025 Pangasinan's 1st district provincial board election (Note: Percentages calculated using the formula: (candidate vote / voters who actually voted) x 100)
Party	Candidate	Votes	%
Nacionalista	Apolonia Bacay	149,957	58.26%
Nacionalista	Napoleon Fontelera Jr.	130,912	50.86%
API	Ricky Camba	62,091	24.12%
Total votes		342,960	100.00%

==== 2nd district ====
2025 Pangasinan's 2nd district provincial board election
Party	Candidate	Votes	%
NPC	Philip Theodore Cruz	206,841	64.64%
Nacionalista	Haidee Pacheco	178,587	55.81%
API	Nikiboy Reyes	94,112	29.41%
Independent	Manuel Merrera	19,667	6.15%
Independent	Dondon Fernandez	10,219	3.19%
Total votes		509,426	100.00%

==== 3rd district ====
2025 Pangasinan's 3rd district provincial board election
Party	Candidate	Votes	%
Nacionalista	Shiela Baniqued	253,736	65.37%
Nacionalista	Vici Ventanilla	199,518	51.40%
API	Joesph Arman Bauzon	92,952	23.95%
NPC	Generoso Tulagan Jr.	55,755	14.36%
Independent	Eduardo Gonzales	11,074	2.85%
Total votes		613,035	100.00%

==== 4th district ====
2025 Pangasinan's 4th district provincial board election
Party	Candidate	Votes	%
Nacionalista	Noy De Guzman	103,967	34.41%
Nacionalista	Jerry Rosario	83,361	27.59%
API	Aldrin Soriano	57,639	19.08%
Total votes		244,967	100.00%

==== 5th district ====
2025 Pangasinan's 5th district provincial board election
Party	Candidate	Votes	%
API	Rose Apaga	178,124	57.05%
Lakas	Louie Sison	149,149	47.77%
Lakas	Jesus Basco	115,221	36.91%
Independent	Hero Sumera	47,635	15.26%
Total votes		490,129	100.00%

==== 6th district ====
2025 Pangasinan's 6th district provincial board election
Party	Candidate	Votes	%
Independent	Noel Bince	102,362	35.19%
Liberal	Ranjit Shahani	89,563	30.79%
NPC	Shiela Mae Perez	83,957	28.86%
Nacionalista	Rebecca Saldivar	78,814	27.09%
NPC	Ric Revita	77,591	26.67%
Independent	Walter Aquino	7,989	2.75%
Total votes		440,276	100.00%

== House of Representatives ==
Party Gains Legends: Nacionalista Hold NPC Hold Lakas Hold

District results Nacionalista: 90-100%; NPC: 70-80%; Lakas: 50-60% 60-70% 80-90% 90-100%

Municipal and city results Nacionalista: 90-100%; NPC: 50-60% 60-70% 70-80% 80-90%; Lakas: 50-60% 60-70% 70-80% 80-90% 90-100%; Independent: 50%-60%

Lakas won four of Pangasinan's six congressional districts, while the Nationalist People's Coalition secured the remaining seats. The results were largely consistent with incumbents retaining their seats, with Arthur Celeste of the Nacionalista Party running unopposed in the 1st district, and Gina de Venecia of Lakas winning the 4th district with 84.8% of the vote.

2025 Philippine House of Representatives elections in Pangasinan
Party	Votes	Percentage	Seats	Seat change
Lakas	913,980	54.09%	4	Steady
NPC	348,884	20.65%	1	Steady
Nacionalista	187,173	11.08%	1	Steady
Independents	170,907	10.11%	0	Steady
NUP	68,719	4.07%	0	Steady
Totals	1,689,663	100.00%	6	—

=== 1st district ===
Incumbent congressman Arthur Celeste, a member of the Nacionalista Party, had returned to the House in 2022 with 65.20% of the vote, and no one outside the Celeste family has represented the district since he was first elected in 2001. With Celeste being the sole candidate in the race, he was re-elected to a second term unopposed.

==== Candidates ====
- Arthur Celeste (Nacionalista), incumbent representative since 2022

==== Results ====
2025 House of Representatives election in Pangasinan's 1st district
Party	Candidate	Votes	%	±%
Nacionalista	Arthur Celeste	187,173	100.00%	+34.81
Total votes		187,173	100.00%	N/A

=== 2nd district ===
Incumbent representative Mark Cojuangco, son of businessman Danding Cojuangco, is a member of the Nationalist People's Coalition, the party founded by his father, and had narrowly won the seat in 2022 with 51.7%. His only challenger for re-election was Leopoldo Bataoil, the mayor of Lingayen and himself a former representative of the district, as well as a former Philippine National Police (PNP) police general and regional director. On election day, Cojuangco won 77.1% of the vote, defeating Bataoil in every municipality within the district, including Lingayen.

==== Candidates ====
- Mark Cojuangco (NPC), incumbent representative since 2022
- Leopoldo Bataoil (NUP), incumbent Lingayen Mayor and former representative from 2010–2019

==== Results ====
2025 House of Representatives election in Pangasinan's 2nd district
Party	Candidate	Votes	%	±%
NPC	Mark Cojuangco	231,839	77.14%	+25.41
NUP	Leopoldo Bataoil	68,719	22.86%	N/A
Total votes		300,558	100.00%	N/A

=== 3rd district ===
Incumbent congresswoman Maria Rachel Arenas had won her first term in 2022 as a member of PDP-Laban, taking 90.5% of the vote. Arenas faced two opponents: former representative Gener Tulagan, who had served the district for three terms until 2007, and George Absolor. Despite the competition, Arenas emerged victorious with 91.7% of the vote. Since Tulagan's departure, she and her mother Rosemarie Arenas have been the only people elected to represent this district.

==== Candidates ====
- Maria Rachel Arenas (Lakas), incumbent representative since 2022
- Generoso Tulagan (Independent), former representative from 1998–2007
- George Absolor (Independent), engineer

==== Results ====
2025 House of Representatives election in Pangasinan's 3rd district
Party	Candidate	Votes	%	±%
Lakas	Maria Rachel Arenas	328,672	91.69%	+1.22
Independent	Generoso Tulagan	24,573	6.85%	N/A
Independent	George Absolor	5,228	1.46%	N/A
Total votes		358,473	100.00%	N/A

=== 4th district ===
Incumbent Christopher de Venecia had won a third and final term in 2022 with 80.0% of the vote, making him term-limited and unable to seek re-election. As a result, Lakas-CMD nominated his mother, Gina de Venecia, the wife of former House Speaker Jose de Venecia, the longest-serving House Speaker of the Fifth Republic, as their candidate. Her only opponent was Alvin Fernandez, the former vice mayor of Dagupan. De Venecia won with 84.8% of the vote, sweeping every municipality in the district and successfully returning to the House.

==== Candidates ====
- Gina de Venecia (Lakas), wife of former House Speaker Jose de Venecia Jr.
- Alvin Fernandez (Independent), former vice mayor of Dagupan

==== Results ====
2025 House of Representatives election in Pangasinan's 4th district
Party	Candidate	Votes	%	±%
Lakas	Gina de Venecia	229,189	84.75%	+4.72
Independent	Alvin Fernandez	41,239	15.25%	N/A
Total votes		270,428	100.00%	N/A

=== 5th district ===
Incumbent representative Ramon Guico Jr., a three-time mayor of Binalonan, won his first term in 2022 with 59.4% of the vote, succeeding his son Mon-Mon, who had been elected governor of the province. Guico ran for re-election against councilor Franco del Prado of Urdaneta, coasting to victory with 65.3% of the vote. While he won most of the municipalities in the district, del Prado carried his home city of Urdaneta and the municipality of Bautista.

==== Candidates ====
- Ramon Guico Jr. (Lakas), incumbent representative since 2022
- Franco del Prado (Independent), former vice mayor of Urdaneta from 2013–2016

==== Results ====
2025 House of Representatives election in Pangasinan's 5th district
Party	Candidate	Votes	%	±%
Lakas	Ramon Guico Jr.	187,934	65.30%	+5.90
Independent	Franco del Prado	99,867	34.70%	N/A
Total votes		287,801	100.00%	N/A

=== 6th district ===
Congresswoman Marlyn Primicias-Agabas has represented this district since 2010, with the exception of the three years between 2019 and 2022, and had won her most recent re-election with 92.7% of the vote as a member of PDP-Laban. Her opponent this election was Gilbert Estrella, son of Secretary of Agrarian Reform Conrado Estrella III, who himself represented the district for 18 of the 27 years he served in Congress. Primicias-Agabas won re-election with 59.0% of the vote, in what was the closest race among Pangasinan's six districts.

==== Candidates ====
- Marlyn Primicias-Agabas (Lakas), incumbent representative since 2022
- Gilbert Estrella (NPC), son of former representative Conrado Estrella III

==== Results ====
2025 House of Representatives election in Pangasinan's 6th district
Party	Candidate	Votes	%	±%
Lakas	Marlyn Primicias-Agabas	168,185	58.96%	−33.74
NPC	Gilbert Estrella	117,045	41.04%	N/A
Total votes		285,230	100.00%	N/A

== See also ==
- 2025 Philippine local elections in the Ilocos Region
- 2025 Philippine general election
