= List of Cultural Properties of the Philippines in Agno, Pangasinan =

This list contains an overview of the government recognised Cultural Properties of the Philippines in Agno, a municipality in the province of Pangasinan. Pangasinan is located in the Ilocos Region of Luzon.

The list is based on the official lists provided by the National Commission for Culture and the Arts, National Historical Commission of the Philippines, and the National Museum of the Philippines.

Cultural Property wmph identifier (Note: wmph is an internal identifier used by Wikimedia Philippines to identify the monument. This is not an official identifier, and only shown temporarily in the templates until the government creates an updated complete list.)	Site name	Description	Province	City or municipality	Address	Coordinates	Image
	Saint Catherine de Alexandria Parish Church	Construction started in 1834	Pangasinan	Agno, Pangasinan	Zamora St.	16°07′00″N 119°47′59″E	Upload file
	Church Convent	Construction started in 1845	Pangasinan	Agno, Pangasinan	Zamora St.	16°07′00″N 119°47′58″E	Upload file
	Agno Central School	Gabaldon building, built between 1915-1920	Pangasinan	Agno, Pangasinan	Mabini St.	16°07′07″N 119°47′49″E	Upload file
	Don Angel Sison Bridge	Old bridge parallel to Don Marcelo Nagal Bridge	Pangasinan	Agno, Pangasinan		16°07′07″N 119°47′49″E	Upload file
	Kirai House	Construction finished on May 7, 1947	Pangasinan	Agno, Pangasinan	03 Regidor St.		Upload file
	Unknown House (Jan Jedd's Store)		Pangasinan	Agno, Pangasinan	88 Rizal St.		Upload file
	Unknown House		Pangasinan	Agno, Pangasinan	Gomez St. corner Rizal St.		Upload file
	Unknown House		Pangasinan	Agno, Pangasinan	18 Bonifacio St.		Upload file
	Fran House		Pangasinan	Agno, Pangasinan	Jaena St.		Upload file
	Unknown House		Pangasinan	Agno, Pangasinan			Upload file
	Nilo House	Built in the 1870s	Pangasinan	Agno, Pangasinan	62 Rizal St.		Upload file
	Nino House		Pangasinan	Agno, Pangasinan	54 Rizal St.		Upload file
	Unknown House		Pangasinan	Agno, Pangasinan			Upload file
	Navata-Padama House	Built around 1910	Pangasinan	Agno, Pangasinan	41 Rizal St.		Upload file
	Batalia House		Pangasinan	Agno, Pangasinan	48 Rizal St.		Upload file
	Nino House	Built in 1932	Pangasinan	Agno, Pangasinan	27 (old #) Rizal St.		Upload file
	Unknown House		Pangasinan	Agno, Pangasinan	22 Zamora St.		Upload file
	De Guzman House	Built in 1957	Pangasinan	Agno, Pangasinan	26 Zamora St.		Upload file
