= 2022 Dagupan local elections =

- May 9, 2022
- Registered: 138,721
- Turnout: 89.87% (▲6.24 pp)
- Mayoral election
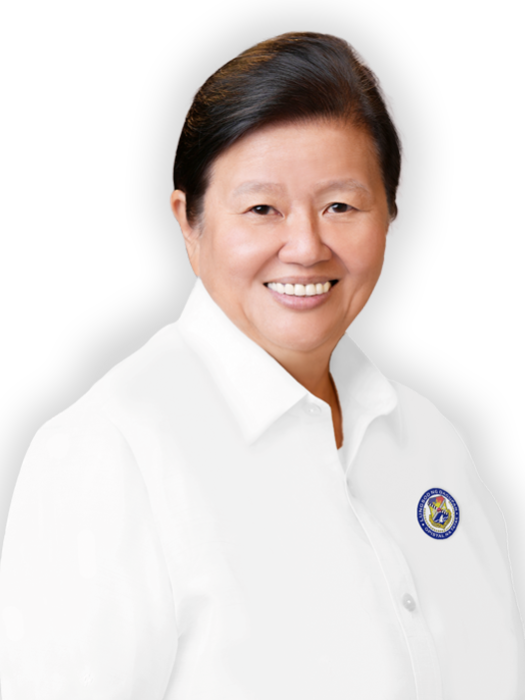

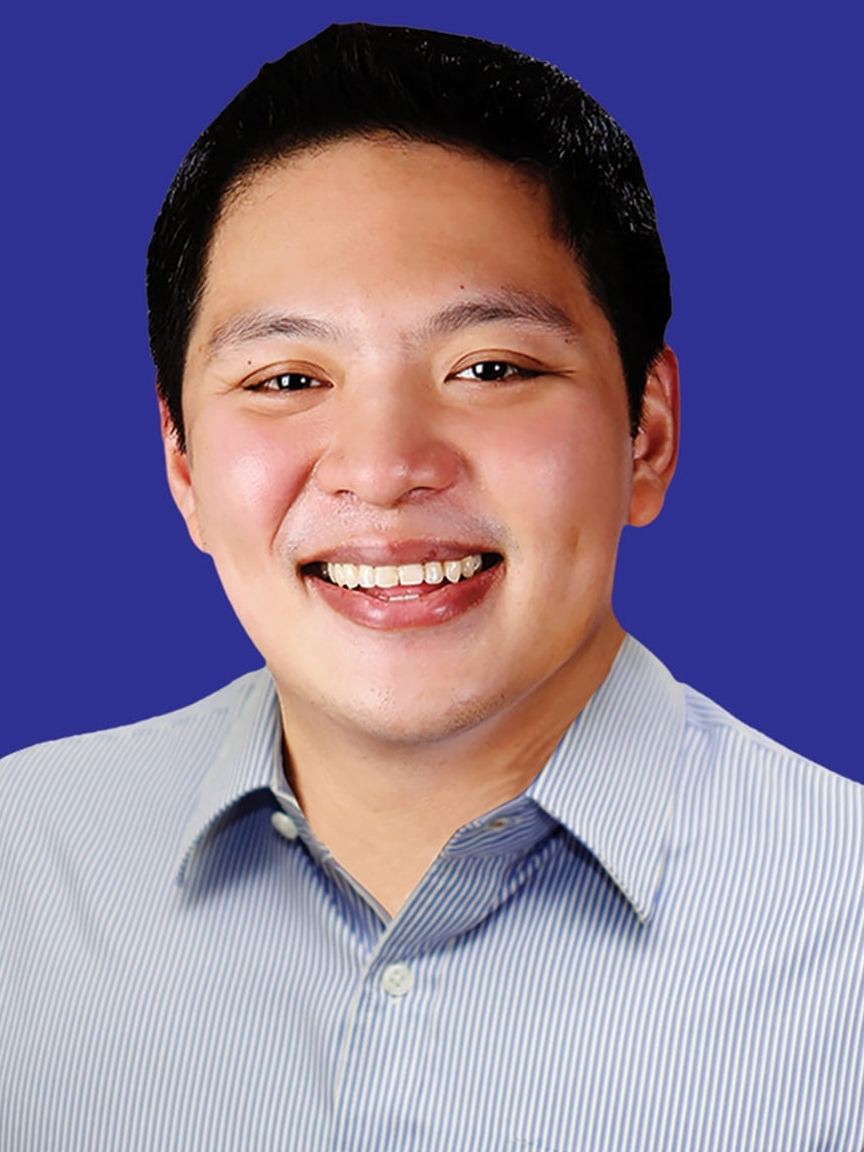
Candidate	Belen Fernandez	Brian Lim
Party	Aksyon	Nacionalista
Running mate	Bryan Kua	Carlos Alipio Fernandez
Popular vote	67,499	53,042
Percentage	55.80%	43.85%
Fernandez 50–60% 60–70% 70–80%	Lim 50–60% 60–70%
Mayor before election
Bryan Lim
Nacionalista
Elected mayor
Belen Fernandez
Aksyon
- Vice mayoral election
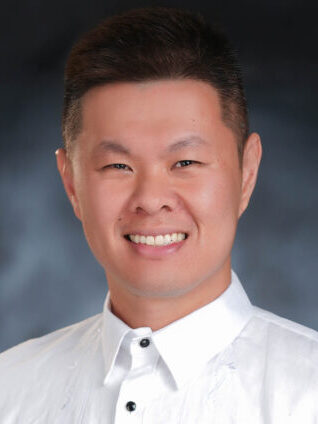
Candidate	Bryan Kua	Carlos Alipio Fernandez
Party	Aksyon	Nacionalista
Popular vote	73,766	42,689
Percentage	63.34%	36.66%
Kua
50–60%
60–70%
70–80%
Vice mayor before election
Bryan Kua
Lakas
Elected Vice mayor
Bryan Kua
Aksyon
- City Council election

10 of 12 seats in the Dagupan City council 7 seats needed for a majority
	First party	Second party	Third party
Party	Nacionalista	Aksyon	KANP
Last election	3 Seats, 44.93%	Did not participate	new
Seats before	3	new	new
Seats won	7	2	1
Seat change	▲4	new	new
Popular vote	483,527	340,183	97,916
Percentage	59.43%	33.89%	9.75%

Local elections were held in Dagupan, Pangasinan on May 9, 2022, as part of the 2022 Philippine general election. The electorate elected a mayor, vice mayor, and 10 members of the Dagupan City Council. The officials elected in this election assumed their respective offices on June 30, 2022, for a three-year-long term.

Belen Fernandez defeated incumbent mayor Brian Lim, while Bryan Kua was re-elected as vice mayor.

== Background ==
In the 2019 elections, a major political upset occurred when incumbent Vice Mayor Marc Brian Lim defeated two-term incumbent Mayor Belen Fernandez (Lakas-CMD) by a narrow margin of 1,239 votes.

The high-stakes mayoral contest was closely watched as a clash between two prominent local political families that also dominate retail and commercial businesses in Northern Luzon, the Lim family (operators of the Magic Group of Companies) and the Fernandez family (owners of City Supermarket, Inc.).

== Electoral system ==
Local elections in the Philippines take place every three years on the second Monday of May starting in 1992 and every three years thereafter, as per the 1987 constitution. Single-member positions such as mayor and vice mayor are chosen through a first-past-the-post system. The mayor, vice mayor, and the city councilors are elected by all voters in the city at large.

City council members are selected using a plurality block voting method. Two additional ex officio members join the council later in the year, representing the presidents of the Liga ng mga Barangay and the Sangguniang Kabataan, both chosen after the barangay and Sangguniang Kabataan elections.

== Campaign ==
The campaign period for local elections began on March 28, 2022, and ended on May 10 as per the omnibus election code.

Ahead of the May 2022 elections, candidates in Dagupan City, including incumbent Mayor Marc Brian Lim and former Mayor Belen Fernandez participated in a simultaneous unity walk and peace covenant signing organized by the Commission on Elections, the Philippine National Police, and religious sectors to promote a peaceful and orderly electoral process.

During the campaign period in February 2022, prominent local officials in Pangasinan, including Dagupan City Mayor Brian Lim, publicly welcomed and endorsed presidential candidate Ferdinand "Bongbong" Marcos Jr. as he toured the province.

== Mayor ==
=== Candidates ===
- Belen T. Fernandez (Aksyon), former mayor of Dagupan (2013–2019)
- Brian C. Lim (Nacionalista), incumbent mayor of Dagupan (2019–present)

Candidate	Party	Votes	%
Belen Fernandez	Aksyon Demokratiko	67,499	55.80
Brian Lim (incumbent)	Nacionalista Party	53,042	43.85
Juan Siapno Jr.	Independent	417	0.34
Total		120,958	100.00
Valid votes		120,958	97.33
Invalid/blank votes		3,312	2.67
Total votes		124,270	100.00
Registered voters/turnout		138,721	89.58
Aksyon gain from Nacionalista			
Source: Commission on Elections

==== Results per barangay ====
Legend
Barangays won by Fernandez
Barangays won by Lim

Barangay	Belen Fernandez		Brian Lim		Juan Siapno Jr.		Margin		Total votes
Barangay	Votes	%	Votes	%	Votes	%	%	Votes	Total votes
Bacayao Norte	1,195	59.33%	816	40.52%	3	0.15%	18.82%	379	2,014
Bacayao Sur	1,151	56.67%	875	43.08%	5	0.25%	13.59%	276	2,031
Barangay I (T. Bugallon)	543	51.67%	501	47.67%	7	0.67%	4.00%	42	1,051
Barangay II (Nueva)	720	36.51%	1,249	63.34%	3	0.15%	26.83%	529	1,972
Barangay IV (Zamora)	697	45.62%	822	53.80%	9	0.59%	8.18%	125	1,528
Bolosan District	1,627	55.53%	1,297	44.27%	6	0.20%	11.26%	330	2,930
Bonuan Binloc	3,996	60.34%	2,609	39.39%	18	0.27%	20.94%	1,387	6,623
Bonuan Boquig	5,150	55.35%	4,128	44.37%	26	0.28%	10.98%	1,022	9,304
Bonuan Gueset	8,552	56.65%	6,495	43.02%	50	0.33%	13.63%	2,057	15,097
Calmay District	2,473	59.36%	1,689	40.54%	4	0.10%	18.82%	784	4,166
Carael District	2,203	57.96%	1,590	41.83%	8	0.21%	16.13%	613	3,801
Caranglaan District	3,216	55.84%	2,523	43.81%	20	0.35%	12.03%	693	5,759
Herrero	1,042	49.15%	1,072	50.57%	6	0.28%	1.42%	30	2,120
Lasip Chico	824	51.56%	770	48.19%	4	0.25%	3.38%	54	1,598
Lasip Grande	1,094	55.84%	862	44.00%	3	0.15%	11.84%	232	1,959
Lomboy	645	56.28%	497	43.37%	4	0.35%	12.91%	148	1,146
Lucao District	5,142	69.25%	2,249	30.29%	34	0.46%	38.96%	2,893	7,425
Malued District	3,590	55.39%	2,849	43.96%	42	0.65%	11.43%	741	6,481
Mamalingling District	850	68.27%	394	31.65%	1	0.08%	36.63%	456	1,245
Mangin	1,524	54.23%	1,276	45.41%	10	0.36%	8.83%	248	2,810
Mayombo District	2,214	46.99%	2,470	52.42%	28	0.59%	5.43%	256	4,712
Pantal District	6,607	56.83%	4,980	42.84%	38	0.33%	14.00%	1,627	11,625
Poblacion Oeste	1,558	51.57%	1,445	47.83%	18	0.60%	3.74%	113	3,021
Pogo Chico	1,909	53.94%	1,613	45.58%	17	0.48%	8.36%	296	3,539
Pogo Grande	797	48.81%	831	50.89%	5	0.31%	2.08%	34	1,633
Pugaro Suit	1,782	53.95%	1,513	45.81%	8	0.24%	8.14%	269	3,303
Salapingao	1,279	60.36%	840	39.64%	0	0.00%	20.72%	439	2,119
Salisay	885	48.63%	932	51.21%	3	0.16%	2.58%	47	1,820
Tambac District	1,107	51.04%	1,059	48.82%	3	0.14%	2.21%	48	2,169
Tapuac District	1,977	52.43%	1,767	46.86%	27	0.72%	5.57%	210	3,771
Tebeng	1,150	52.61%	1,029	47.07%	7	0.32%	5.53%	121	2,186
Total	67,499	55.80%	53,042	43.85%	417	0.34%	11.95%	14,457	120,958

== Vice Mayor ==
=== Candidates ===
- Bryan L. Kua (Aksyon), incumbent vice mayor of Dagupan (2019–present)
- Carlos Alipio T. Fernandez (Nacionalista)

Candidate	Party	Votes	%
Byran Kua (incumbent)	Aksyon Demokratiko	73,766	63.34
Carlos Alipio Fernandez	Nacionalista Party	42,689	36.66
Total		116,455	100.00
Valid votes		116,455	93.69
Invalid/blank votes		7,842	6.31
Total votes		124,297	100.00
Registered voters/turnout		138,721	89.60
Aksyon hold			
Source: Commission on Elections

==== Results per barangay ====
Legend
Barangays won by Kua
Barangays won by Fernandez

Barangay	Dean Bryan Kua		Carlos Alipio Fernandez		Margin		Total votes
Barangay	Votes	%	Votes	%	%	Votes	Total votes
Bacayao Norte	1,218	63.08%	713	36.92%	26.15%	505	1,931
Bacayao Sur	1,163	59.31%	798	40.69%	18.61%	365	1,961
Barangay I (T. Bugallon)	659	64.73%	359	35.27%	29.47%	300	1,018
Barangay II (Nueva)	921	48.63%	973	51.37%	2.75%	52	1,894
Barangay IV (Zamora)	819	55.90%	646	44.10%	11.81%	173	1,465
Bolosan District	1,829	64.56%	1,004	35.44%	29.12%	825	2,833
Bonuan Binloc	4,268	67.29%	2,075	32.71%	34.57%	2,193	6,343
Bonuan Boquig	5,354	59.87%	3,588	40.13%	19.75%	1,766	8,942
Bonuan Gueset	8,990	61.78%	5,562	38.22%	23.56%	3,428	14,552
Calmay District	2,736	68.45%	1,261	31.55%	36.90%	1,475	3,997
Carael District	2,369	65.35%	1,256	34.65%	30.70%	1,113	3,625
Caranglaan District	3,486	62.46%	2,095	37.54%	24.92%	1,391	5,581
Herrero	1,257	61.14%	799	38.86%	22.28%	458	2,056
Lasip Chico	976	64.59%	535	35.41%	29.18%	441	1,511
Lasip Grande	1,175	62.24%	713	37.76%	24.47%	462	1,888
Lomboy	667	60.75%	431	39.25%	21.49%	236	1,098
Lucao District	5,546	77.60%	1,601	22.40%	55.20%	3,945	7,147
Malued District	3,917	62.70%	2,330	37.30%	25.40%	1,587	6,247
Mamalingling District	849	70.46%	356	29.54%	40.91%	493	1,205
Mangin	1,566	57.98%	1,135	42.02%	15.96%	431	2,701
Mayombo District	2,870	63.19%	1,672	36.81%	26.38%	1,198	4,542
Pantal District	7,168	63.89%	4,052	36.11%	27.77%	3,116	11,220
Poblacion Oeste	1,820	63.28%	1,056	36.72%	26.57%	764	2,876
Pogo Chico	2,425	69.90%	1,044	30.10%	39.81%	1,381	3,469
Pogo Grande	880	55.73%	699	44.27%	11.46%	181	1,579
Pugaro Suit	1,969	62.23%	1,195	37.77%	24.46%	774	3,164
Salapingao	1,288	62.89%	760	37.11%	25.78%	528	2,048
Salisay	854	49.05%	887	50.95%	1.90%	33	1,741
Tambac District	1,266	60.60%	823	39.40%	21.21%	443	2,089
Tapuac District	2,219	61.25%	1,404	38.75%	22.49%	815	3,623
Tebeng	1,242	58.89%	867	41.11%	17.78%	375	2,109
Total	73,766	63.34%	42,689	36.66%	26.68%	31,077	116,455

== City Council ==
The Dagupan City Council is composed of 12 councilors, 10 of whom are elected.

29 candidates were included in the ballot.

The Nacionalista Party won seven seats, gaining a majority in the city council.

Party	Votes	%	Seats	+/–
Nacionalista Party	483,527	48.17	7	+4
Aksyon Demokratiko	340,183	33.89	2	New
Katipunan ng Nagkakaisang Pilipino	97,916	9.75	1	New
Kilusang Bagong Lipunan	35,039	3.49	0	New
Independent	47,207	4.70	0	0
Total	1,003,872	100.00	10	0
Total votes	124,668	–		
Registered voters/turnout	138,721	89.87		

Candidate	Party	Votes	%
Dada Manaois Reyna (incumbent)	Nacionalista Party	69,392	6.91
Jigs Seen	Aksyon Demokratiko	59,340	5.91
Alvin Coquia	Nacionalista Party	59,237	5.90
Celia Lim (incumbent)	Nacionalista Party	57,889	5.77
Malou Fernandez	Nacionalista Party	57,693	5.75
Alipio Serafin Fernandez	Nacionalista Party	57,106	5.69
Red Erfe-Mejia	Nacionalista Party	54,480	5.43
Dennis Canto (incumbent)	Aksyon Demokratiko	53,720	5.35
Irene Lim Acosta	Nacionalista Party	51,787	5.16
Michael Fernandez (incumbent)	Katipunan ng Nagkakaisang Pilipino	51,211	5.10
Chito Samson (incumbent)	Aksyon Demokratiko	49,123	4.89
Tess Coquia (incumbent)	Aksyon Demokratiko	48,242	4.81
Karlos Reyna (incumbent)	Katipunan ng Nagkakaisang Pilipino	46,705	4.65
Teddy Villamil Jr.	Nacionalista Party	43,380	4.32
Emong Vallejos	Aksyon Demokratiko	36,275	3.61
Diane Decano	Aksyon Demokratiko	35,604	3.55
Leo Cuaton	Kilusang Bagong Lipunan	35,039	3.49
Jek Palaganas	Nacionalista Party	32,563	3.24
Josh Bugayong	Aksyon Demokratiko	32,141	3.20
Danila Cayabyab	Aksyon Demokratiko	25,738	2.56
Raul delos Santos	Independent	11,941	1.19
Jonarch Aquino Jr.	Independent	7,664	0.76
Bizzyblade dela Cruz	Independent	6,583	0.66
Pink Salve Bravo	Independent	4,849	0.48
Mercy Saplan	Independent	3,732	0.37
Manuel John Sia	Independent	3,600	0.36
Mary Rose Olaguer	Independent	3,550	0.35
Alfredo Dawana	Independent	3,423	0.34
Anselmo Atabes	Independent	1,865	0.19
Total		1,003,872	100.00
Total votes		124,668	–
Registered voters/turnout		138,721	89.87
Source: Commission on Elections

== See also ==
- 2022 Pangasinan local elections
