= 2025 Dagupan local elections =

- May 12, 2025
- Registered: 144,481
- Turnout: 87.51% (▼2.36 pp)
- Mayoral election
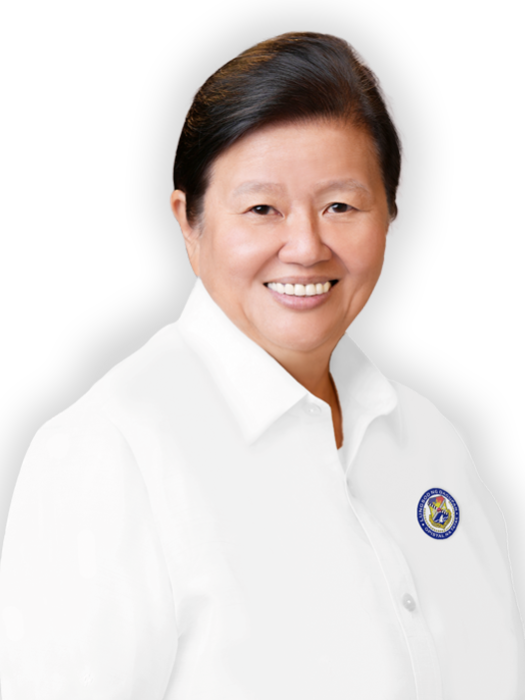

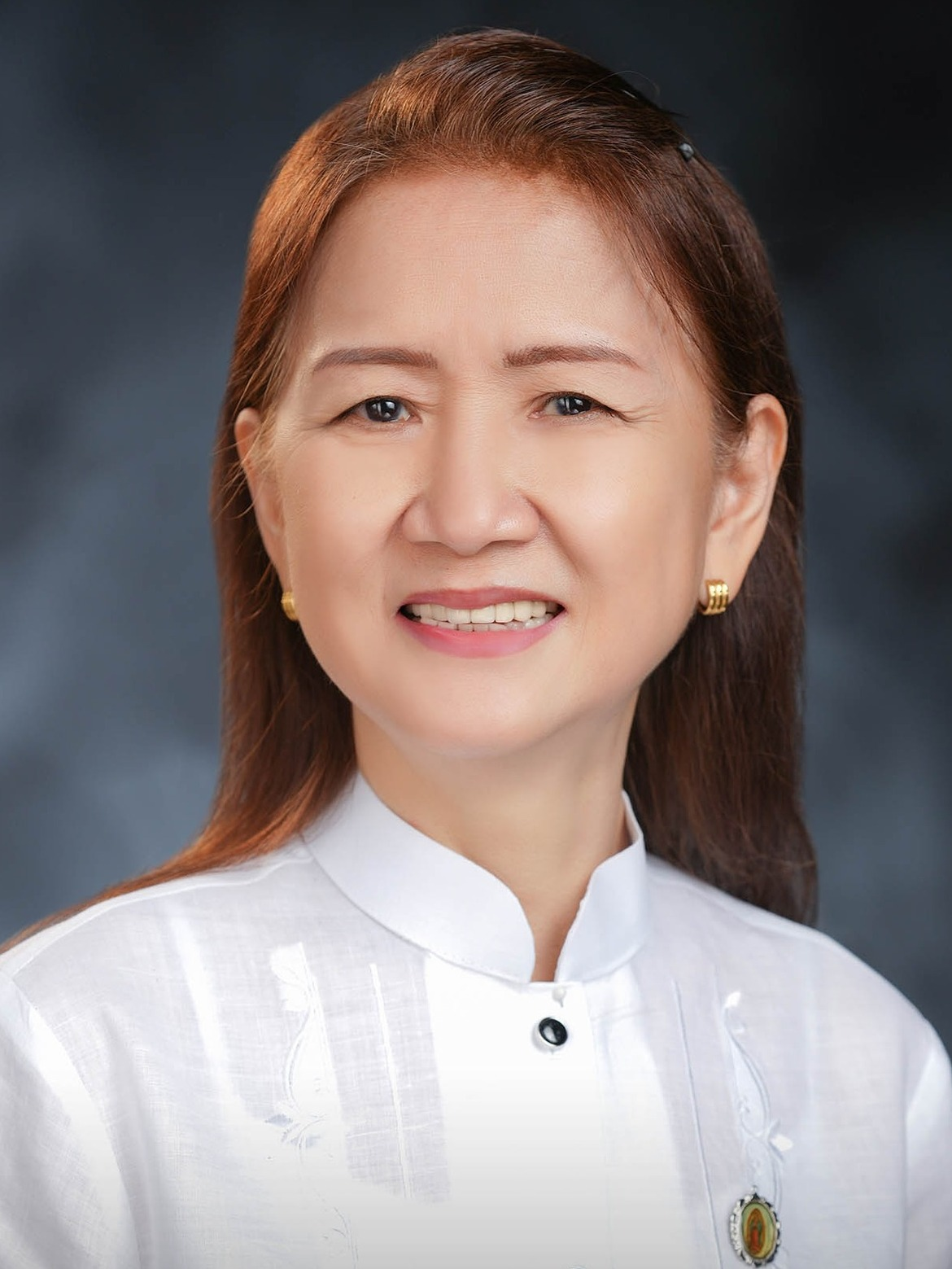
Candidate	Belen Fernandez	Celia Lim
Party	PFP	Nacionalista
Alliance	UNLISERBISYO	Team LiFe
Running mate	Bryan Kua	Brian Lim
Popular vote	81,977	42,200
Percentage	66.02%	33.98%
Fernandez
50–60%
60–70%
70–80%
80–90%
Mayor before election
Belen Fernandez
Aksyon
Elected mayor
Belen Fernandez
PFP
- Vice mayoral election
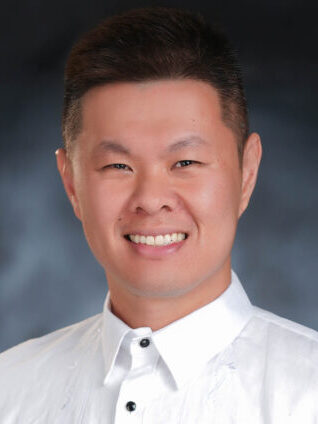

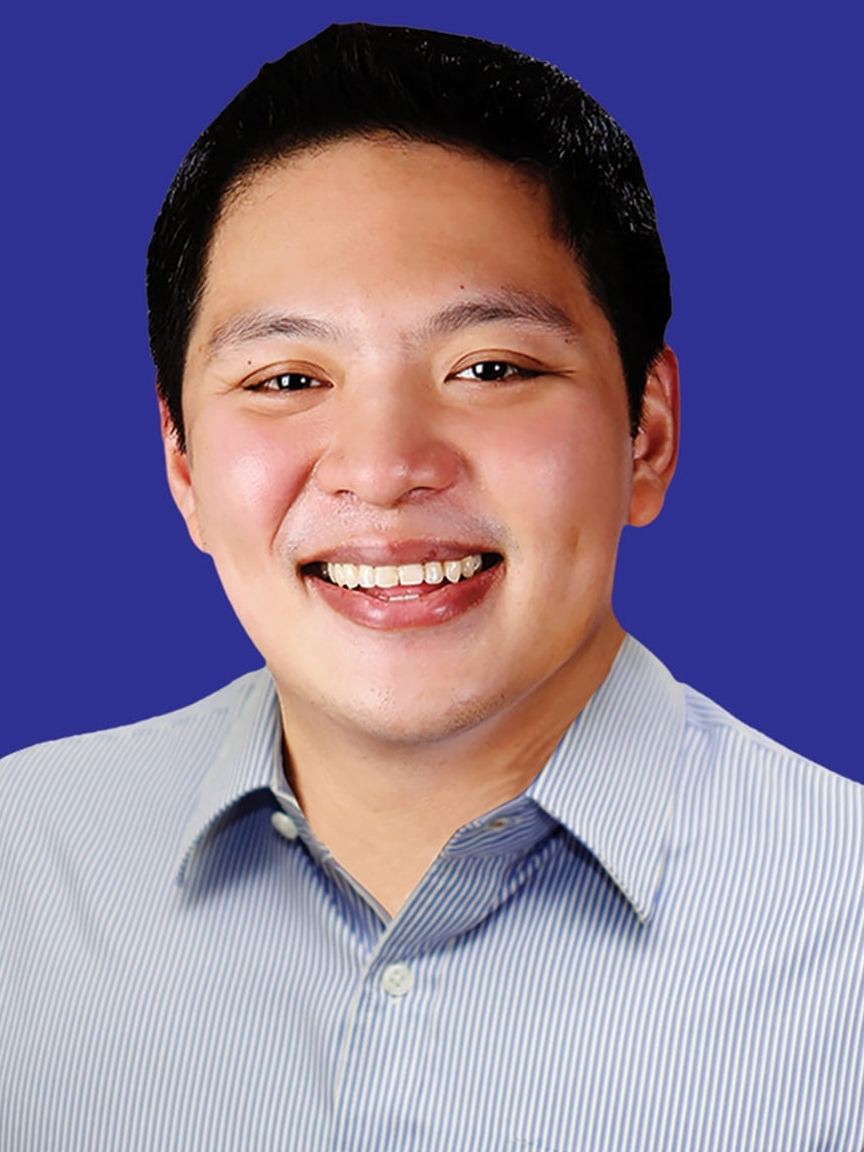
Candidate	Bryan Kua	Brian Lim
Party	PFP	Lakas
Alliance	UNLISERBISYO	Team LiFe
Popular vote	65,765	57,965
Percentage	53.15%	46.85%
Kua 50–60% 60–70% 70–80%	Lim 50–60%
Vice mayor before election
Bryan Kua
Aksyon
Elected Vice mayor
Bryan Kua
PFP
- City Council election

10 of 12 seats in the Dagupan City council 7 seats needed for a majority
	First party	Second party	Third party
Party	PFP	Nacionalista	Independent
Last election	Did not participate	7 seats, 48.17%	no seats, 4.70%
Seats before	new	7 seats	0 seat
Seats won	9	1	0
Seat change	new	▼6	Steady
Popular vote	611,701	401,498	16,095
Percentage	59.43%	39.01%	1.56%

Local elections were held in Dagupan, Pangasinan on May 12, 2025, as part of the 2025 Philippine general election. The electorate elected a mayor, vice mayor, and 10 members of the Dagupan City Council. The officials elected in this election assumed their respective offices on June 30, 2025, for a three-year-long term.

Belen Fernandez and Bryan Kua were re-elected mayor on her second consecutive term and vice mayor on his third term respectively, defeating the mother-son duo Celia Lim and Brian Lim.

== Background ==
In the 2022 elections, incumbent Mayor Brian Lim was defeated by Belen Fernandez in a rematch with a margin of 14,457 votes. In the vice mayoral election, incumbent Dean Bryan Kua defeated Carlos Alipio Fernandez, with a margin of 31,077 votes.

On Monday, Oct. 7 2025. Incumbent Mayor Belen Fernandez was challenged by Councilor Celia Lim, who officially filed her certificate of candidacy (COC).

Lim, running under the Nacionalista Party, was joined by her son, former Mayor Brian Lim, who is her vice mayoral candidate, along with their full slate of councilors.

== Electoral system ==
Local elections in the Philippines take place every three years on the second Monday of May starting in 1992 and every three years thereafter, as per the 1987 constitution. Single-member positions such as mayor and vice mayor are chosen through a first-past-the-post system. The mayor, vice mayor, and the city councilors are elected by all voters in the city at large.

City council members are selected using a plurality block voting method. Two additional ex officio members join the council later in the year, representing the presidents of the Liga ng mga Barangay and the Sangguniang Kabataan, both chosen after the barangay and Sangguniang Kabataan elections.

== Campaign ==
The campaign period for local elections began on March 28, 2025, and ended on May 10 as per the omnibus election code.

=== Vote Buying ===
During the 2025 local elections in Dagupan City, reports of vote-buying emerged as a major concern for election authorities. The Commission on Elections (COMELEC) warned that individuals caught engaging in vote-buying or vote-selling could face warrantless arrest, emphasizing its commitment to curb electoral malpractice ahead of the polls. On election day, police authorities arrested six individuals in Dagupan City for alleged vote-buying activities, as part of intensified operations to ensure a clean and orderly election process.

== Tickets ==
Note: names in italic are incumbents

Team UNLISERBISYO
Position	#	Name	Party
Mayor	1	Belen Fernandez	PFP
Vice mayor	1	Bryan Kua	PFP
City councilor	2	Joshua Bugayong	PFP
City councilor	3	Danee Canto	PFP
City councilor	4	Jaja Cayabyab	PFP
City councilor	11	Marvin Fabia	PFP
City councilor	14	Michael Fernandez	PFP
City councilor	16	Tala Paras	PFP
City councilor	18	Karlos Reyna	PFP
City councilor	19	Chito Samson	PFP
City councilor	20	Jigs Seen	PFP
City councilor	22	Joey Tamayo	PFP

Team LiFe
Position	#	Name	Party
Mayor	2	Celia Lim	Nacionalista
Vice mayor	2	Brian Lim	Nacionalista
City councilor	1	Irene Lim Acosta	Nacionalista
City councilor	5	Benedict Cayabyab	Nacionalista
City councilor	6	Tope Lim Chua	Nacionalista
City councilor	7	Alvin Coquia	Nacionalista
City councilor	8	Leo Cuaton	Nacionalista
City councilor	10	Red Erfe-Mejia	Nacionalista
City councilor	12	Alfie Fernandez	Nacionalista
City councilor	13	Malou Fernandez	Nacionalista
City councilor	15	Jek Palaganas	Nacionalista
City councilor	17	Dada Manaois Reyna	Nacionalista

Independents
Position	#	Name	Party
City councilor	9	Apring Dawana	Independent
City councilor	21	Manuel John Sia	Independent
City councilor	23	Mackoy Vinluan	Independent

== Mayor ==
Incumbent Mayor Belen Fernandez of the Partido Federal ng Pilipinas ran for a second term. She was previously affiliated with Aksyon Demokratiko.

Celia Lim, incumbent councilor challenges Belen Fernandez's re-election, but was defeated.

=== Candidates ===
- Belen T. Fernandez (PFP), incumbent mayor of Dagupan (2022–present)
- Celia "Manang Celia" C. Lim (Nacionalista), incumbent councilor of Dagupan (2019–present)

Candidate	Party	Votes	%
Belen Fernandez (incumbent)	Partido Federal ng Pilipinas	81,977	66.02
Celia Lim	Nacionalista Party	42,200	33.98
Total		124,177	100.00
Valid votes		124,177	98.21
Invalid/blank votes		2,265	1.79
Total votes		126,442	100.00
Registered voters/turnout		144,481	87.51
Partido Federal ng Pilipinas hold			
Source: Commission on Elections

==== Results per barangay ====
Legend
Barangays won by Fernandez
Barangays won by Lim

Barangay	Belen Fernandez		Celia Lim		Margin		Total votes
Barangay	Votes	%	Votes	%	%	Votes	Total votes
Bacayao Norte	1,491	70.07%	637	29.93%	40.13%	854	2,128
Bacayao Sur	1,605	73.66%	574	26.34%	47.32%	1,031	2,179
Barangay I (T. Bugallon)	776	67.83%	368	32.17%	35.66%	408	1,144
Barangay II (Nueva)	1,859	80.72%	444	19.28%	61.44%	1,415	2,303
Barangay IV (Zamora)	844	60.03%	562	39.97%	20.06%	282	1,406
Bolosan District	2,094	69.50%	919	30.50%	39.00%	1,175	3,013
Bonuan Binloc	4,659	64.41%	2,574	35.59%	28.83%	2,085	7,233
Bonuan Boquig	6,409	65.67%	3,351	34.33%	31.33%	3,058	9,760
Bonuan Gueset	9,525	62.34%	5,753	37.66%	24.69%	3,772	15,278
Calmay District	3,033	69.45%	1,334	30.55%	38.91%	1,699	4,367
Carael District	2,309	61.00%	1,476	39.00%	22.01%	833	3,785
Caranglaan District	3,693	64.37%	2,044	35.63%	28.74%	1,649	5,737
Herrero	1,296	58.94%	903	41.06%	17.87%	393	2,199
Lasip Chico	1,276	75.41%	416	24.59%	50.83%	860	1,692
Lasip Grande	1,303	65.08%	699	34.92%	30.17%	604	2,002
Lomboy	899	75.42%	293	24.58%	50.84%	606	1,192
Lucao District	5,921	76.28%	1,841	23.72%	52.56%	4,080	7,762
Malued District	4,375	65.78%	2,276	34.22%	31.56%	2,099	6,651
Mamalingling District	1,108	79.43%	287	20.57%	58.85%	821	1,395
Mangin	2,235	74.08%	782	25.92%	48.16%	1,453	3,017
Mayombo District	2,716	57.30%	2,024	42.70%	14.60%	692	4,740
Pantal District	7,058	62.82%	4,177	37.18%	25.64%	2,881	11,235
Poblacion Oeste	1,922	63.52%	1,104	36.48%	27.03%	818	3,026
Pogo Chico	2,044	60.58%	1,330	39.42%	21.16%	714	3,374
Pogo Grande	965	59.17%	666	40.83%	18.33%	299	1,631
Pugaro Suit	2,561	73.63%	917	26.37%	47.27%	1,644	3,478
Salapingao	1,620	74.24%	562	25.76%	48.49%	1,058	2,182
Salisay	1,284	66.91%	635	33.09%	33.82%	649	1,919
Tambac District	1,392	60.97%	891	39.03%	21.94%	501	2,283
Tapuac District	2,113	58.81%	1,480	41.19%	17.62%	633	3,593
Tebeng	1,592	64.38%	881	35.62%	28.75%	711	2,473
Total	81,977	66.02%	42,200	33.98%	39,777	32.04%	124,177

== Vice Mayor ==
Incumbent Vice Mayor Bryan Kua of the Partido Federal ng Pilipinas ran for a third term. He was previously affiliated with Aksyon Demokratiko.

Kua won re-election against former Dagupan mayor Brian Lim.

=== Candidates ===
- Dean Bryan "BK" L. Kua (PFP), incumbent vice mayor of Dagupan (2019–present)
- Brian C. Lim (Nacionalista), former mayor of Dagupan (2019–2022)

Candidate	Party	Votes	%
Bryan Kua (incumbent)	Partido Federal ng Pilipinas	65,765	53.15
Brian Lim	Nacionalista Party	57,965	46.85
Total		123,730	100.00
Valid votes		123,730	97.86
Invalid/blank votes		2,712	2.14
Total votes		126,442	100.00
Registered voters/turnout		144,481	87.51
Partido Federal ng Pilipinas hold			
Source: Commission on Elections

==== Results per barangay ====
Legend
Barangays won by Kua
Barangays won by Lim

Barangay	Bryan Kua		Brian Lim		Margin		Total votes
Barangay	Votes	%	Votes	%	%	Votes	Total votes
Bacayao Norte	1,160	54.67%	962	45.33%	9.33%	198	2,122
Bacayao Sur	1,271	58.25%	911	41.75%	16.50%	360	2,182
Barangay I (T. Bugallon)	633	55.09%	516	44.91%	10.18%	117	1,149
Barangay II (Nueva)	1,640	71.55%	652	28.45%	43.11%	988	2,292
Barangay IV (Zamora)	664	47.26%	741	52.74%	-5.48%	-77	1,405
Bolosan District	1,629	54.26%	1,373	45.74%	8.53%	256	3,002
Bonuan Binloc	3,610	50.22%	3,578	49.78%	0.45%	32	7,188
Bonuan Boquig	4,937	50.70%	4,801	49.30%	1.40%	136	9,738
Bonuan Gueset	7,572	49.81%	7,630	50.19%	-0.38%	-58	15,202
Calmay District	2,574	59.27%	1,769	40.73%	18.54%	805	4,343
Carael District	1,857	49.55%	1,891	50.45%	-0.91%	-34	3,748
Caranglaan District	2,929	51.12%	2,801	48.88%	2.23%	128	5,730
Herrero	982	44.80%	1,210	55.20%	-10.40%	-228	2,192
Lasip Chico	995	59.09%	689	40.91%	18.17%	306	1,684
Lasip Grande	1,075	53.78%	924	46.22%	7.55%	151	1,999
Lomboy	796	67.34%	386	32.66%	34.69%	410	1,182
Lucao District	4,898	63.40%	2,827	36.60%	26.81%	2,071	7,725
Malued District	3,349	50.52%	3,280	49.48%	1.04%	69	6,629
Mamalingling District	927	66.93%	458	33.07%	33.86%	469	1,385
Mangin	1,758	58.21%	1,262	41.79%	16.42%	496	3,020
Mayombo District	2,103	44.74%	2,598	55.26%	-10.53%	-495	4,701
Pantal District	5,831	52.01%	5,380	47.99%	4.02%	451	11,211
Poblacion Oeste	1,550	51.16%	1,480	48.84%	2.31%	70	3,030
Pogo Chico	1,876	55.47%	1,506	44.53%	10.94%	370	3,382
Pogo Grande	722	44.43%	903	55.57%	-11.14%	-181	1,625
Pugaro Suit	2,044	59.11%	1,414	40.89%	18.22%	630	3,458
Salapingao	1,342	61.84%	828	38.16%	23.69%	514	2,170
Salisay	973	50.55%	952	49.45%	1.09%	21	1,925
Tambac District	1,067	46.92%	1,207	53.08%	-6.16%	-140	2,274
Tapuac District	1,730	48.35%	1,848	51.65%	-3.30%	-118	3,578
Tebeng	1,271	51.69%	1,188	48.31%	3.38%	83	2,459
Total	65,765	53.15%	57,965	46.85%	6.30%	7,800	123,730

== City Council ==
The Dagupan City Council is composed of 12 councilors, 10 of whom are elected.

23 candidates were included in the ballot.

The Partido Federal ng Pilipinas won nine seats, gaining a majority in the city council.

Party	Votes	%	Seats	+/–
Partido Federal ng Pilipinas	611,701	59.43	9	New
Nacionalista Party	401,498	39.01	1	–6
Independent	16,095	1.56	0	0
Total	1,029,294	100.00	10	0
Total votes	126,442	–		
Registered voters/turnout	144,481	87.51		
Source: Commission on Elections

Candidate	Party	Votes	%
Michael Fernandez (incumbent)	Partido Federal ng Pilipinas	72,462	7.04
Joey Tamayo	Partido Federal ng Pilipinas	65,957	6.41
Tala Paras	Partido Federal ng Pilipinas	63,228	6.14
Jigs Seen (incumbent)	Partido Federal ng Pilipinas	62,683	6.09
Karlos Reyna	Partido Federal ng Pilipinas	61,468	5.97
Danee Canto	Partido Federal ng Pilipinas	61,207	5.95
Chito Samson	Partido Federal ng Pilipinas	60,245	5.85
Marvin Fabia	Partido Federal ng Pilipinas	59,318	5.76
Jaja Cayabyab	Partido Federal ng Pilipinas	55,275	5.37
Dada Manaois Reyna (incumbent)	Nacionalista Party	52,516	5.10
Joshua Bugayong	Partido Federal ng Pilipinas	49,858	4.84
Alfie Fernandez (incumbent)	Nacionalista Party	48,043	4.67
Alvin Coquia (incumbent)	Nacionalista Party	46,905	4.56
Irene Lim Acosta (incumbent)	Nacionalista Party	45,647	4.43
Malou Fernandez (incumbent)	Nacionalista Party	44,798	4.35
Tope Lim Chua	Nacionalista Party	38,596	3.75
Red Erfe-Mejia (incumbent)	Nacionalista Party	37,737	3.67
Benedict Cayabyab	Nacionalista Party	33,494	3.25
Leo Cuaton	Nacionalista Party	31,556	3.07
Jek Palaganas	Nacionalista Party	22,206	2.16
Mackoy Vinluan	Independent	8,663	0.84
Apring Dawana	Independent	4,017	0.39
Manuel John Sia	Independent	3,415	0.33
Total		1,029,294	100.00
Total votes		126,442	–
Registered voters/turnout		144,481	87.51
Source: Commission on Elections

== See also ==
- 2025 Pangasinan local elections
