= Michael Morden =

Filipino activist and congressman

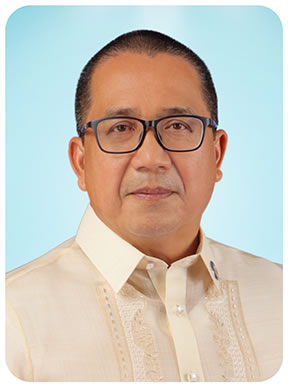

Member of the Philippine House of Representatives for Abante Pangasinan-Ilokano Party
- In office June 30, 2022 – June 30, 2025
- President: Bongbong Marcos

Personal details
- Born: Michael M. Morden Pangasinan, Philippines
- Party: API (partylist; 2021–present)
- Occupation: Politician

Michael Morden is a Filipino party-list representative for the Abante Pangasinan-Ilokano Party. He also was an activist against the Filipino Martial Law.

== Early life ==
Michael Morden was born in the province of Pangasinan, the Philippines.

== Career ==
=== Martial Law ===
Morden was an activist against the implementation of the Martial Law. In 1994, He was captured by the allies of former President Ferdinand Marcos in Pangasinan, he was captured for a year before being released by a court case.

=== Entrepreneurship ===
Morden operated a trading business in Urdaneta City, which lasted for 10 years. He later closed the business to sell Bonsai. He is originally from Villasis, Pangasinan.

=== Politics ===
He was a nominee for the Abante Pangasinan-Ilokano Party for the 2022 elections, he later was picked by his party after they won a seat.

== Political positions ==
Morden advocates multiple positions, including livelihood, peace, health, justice, education, environment, culture, youth, and women rights, he also filed bills regarding the positions: healthcare accessibility, establishment of a national stockpile, benefits for community watchmen, creation of a medical corps, protection of Filipino seafarers, regulation of single-use plastic, and safeguarding the rights of the elderly against abuse and violence. He also supports the Ilocos Region, hence his membership for the Abante Pangasinan-Ilokano Party.

== Bills ==
Michael Morden was the principal author of multiple bills. Namely:

=== House Bill (HB) No. 8463 ===
The bill talks about the implementation of food banks for calamities, Morden was one of the principal authors of the bill, Speaker Martin Romualdez stated "This reality requires us to prepare for the eventuality of storms and similar calamities displacing residents of affected areas. We have to have a faster, a more efficient and a more effective system of responding to disasters and helping our people".
