= Amado Espino III =

Filipino politician

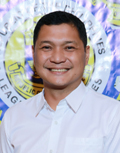

30th Governor of Pangasinan
- In office June 30, 2016 – June 30, 2022
- Vice Governor: Jose Ferdinand Calimlim Jr. (2016–2019); Mark Lambino (2019–2022)
- Preceded by: Amado Espino Jr.
- Succeeded by: Ramon V. Guico III

Personal details
- Born: Amado Ignacio Espino III; November 22, 1977 (age 48) Quezon City, Philippines
- Party: PDP (2018–present); API (local party; 2021–present)
- Other political affiliations: Aksyon (2015–2018); NPC (2007–2015)
- Relations: Amado Espino Jr. (father)

Amado Ignacio Espino III is a Filipino politician from Pangasinan, Philippines. He is a former Governor of Pangasinan. Espino was first elected Governor in 2016 and was re-elected in 2019.

== Electoral history ==
Electoral history of Amado Espino III
Year	Office	Party		Votes received				Result
Year	Office	Local	National	Total	%	P.	Swing	Result
2016	Governor of Pangasinan	—N/a	Aksyon	720,820	58.57%	1st	—N/a	Won
2019	Governor of Pangasinan	—N/a	PDP–Laban	781,307	57.29%	1st	-1.28	Won
2022	Governor of Pangasinan	API	PDP–Laban	699,441	43.80%	2nd	-13.49	Lost
2025	Governor of Pangasinan	API	PDP–Laban	784,470	47.09%	2nd	+3.29	Lost
