= Amado Espino Jr. =

Filipino politician

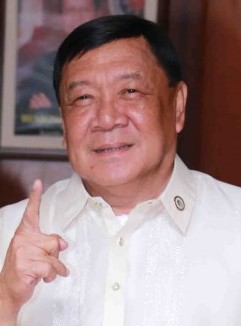
- Espino in August 2014

Member of the Philippine House of Representatives from Pangasinan's 5th congressional district
- In office June 30, 2016 – June 30, 2019
- Preceded by: Kimi Cojuangco
- Succeeded by: Ramon Guico III

29th Governor of Pangasinan
- In office June 30, 2007 – June 30, 2016
- Vice Governor: Marlyn Primicias-Agabas (2007–2010); Jose Ferdinand Calimlim, Jr. (2010–2016)
- Preceded by: Victor Agbayani
- Succeeded by: Amado Espino III

Member of the Philippine House of Representatives from Pangasinan's 2nd district
- In office June 30, 2001 – June 30, 2007
- Preceded by: Teodoro Cruz
- Succeeded by: Victor Agbayani

Personal details
- Born: Amado Totaan Espino Jr. June 20, 1948 (age 78) Bautista, Pangasinan, Philippines
- Party: PDP (2018–present); API (local party; 2021–present)
- Other political affiliations: Aksyon (2012–2018); NPC (2009–2012); KAMPI (2007–2008); Lakas (2001–2007; 2008–2012)
- Spouse: Priscilla Ignacio
- Children: 4, including Amado III
- Profession: Police Officer; Military

Amado Totaan Espino Jr. (born June 20, 1948) is a Filipino politician and the former representative of Pangasinan's 5th District in the Philippine House of Representatives. He earlier served as Governor of the province of Pangasinan.

== Early life ==
Espino was born on June 20, 1948. He finished his secondary education at Bayambang National High School in 1966. He took up three courses in college. First, he took up Bachelor of Science in education (Pangasinan Normal College) but he did not finish it. Then he shifted to Bachelor of Science in commerce (Luzon Colleges). Again, he did not pursue it. In 1972, he earned the degree of Bachelor of Science in Philippine Military Academy and even obtained a degree in Masters in Development Management in 1995 at Pangasinan State University.

== Career history ==
A graduate of PMA, Espino was placed in different police ranks. He started out as an intelligence and operations officer in Quirino Constabulary Command; then, as company commander both in the Philippine Constabulary of La Union and Pangasinan; commanding officer of Angeles Metrodiacom, Pampanga; district commander in Criminal Investigation Service, Region 3 of Philippine National Police; narcotics regional chief of Region 3, Philippine National Police; provincial director, La Union Police Provincial office; provincial director, Pangasinan Police Provincial office; chief, Regional Directorial Staff in Region I, Philippine National Police; and finally, as a regional director in Region I, Philippine National Police.

== As a lawmaker and governor ==
Two-time representative of the second district of Pangasinan, Espino was the first former military and police officer in modern times to become governor of Pangasinan.

Espino vowed to restore peace and order in Pangasinan in the wake of unsolved political killings of San Carlos City Mayor Julian Resuello and San Manuel Vice Mayor Bonie Apilado.

In the campaign, Espino vowed to also put an end to cattle rustling which is rampant in some towns of central Pangasinan, particularly in San Carlos City.

Espino also outlined his other top priorities for Pangasinan which are: tourism and investments promotions; environmental protection, sports development and hosting of national and international events using the Narciso Ramos Sports and Civic Center in Lingayen, venue of the 1995 Palarong Pambansa.

During his oath-taking on June 30, 2007, he was quoted as saying, “Our destiny as a province and our future as a people depend not upon one single person, much less the governor, even with all the powers in his hands."

In 2016 National and Local Elections, Espino ran for representative of 5th District of Pangasinan under Aksyon Demokratiko Party and he was able to win on 2016 Elections against his former ally, Carmen "Kimi" Cojuangco, whose seeking her third and last term in Congress. Espino sought for re-election bid for the second time in the recently concluded 2019 Midterm Elections, however, he lost to Ramon Guico III, a last-term Mayor of Binalonan town located in 5th District.

Meanwhile, Congressman Espino's youngest child, Mayor Jumel Anthony of Bugallon town, won as representative of 2nd District of Pangasinan as well as his wife, Priscilla, won for Mayor of Bugallon, succeeding for their son and lastly incumbent Pangasinan governor Amado "Pogi" Espino III was re-elected for his second term.

== Controversies ==
=== Jueteng involvement ===
In December 2012, Governor Amado Espino was accused of receiving bribes from jueteng operators in Pangasinan amounting to P10 million per month. Espino believes that is political smearing against him by Alaminos Mayor Nani Braganza, his opponent in the election.

Jueteng is an illegal numbers game in the Philippines.

=== Allegation of drug trafficking ===
In August 2016, Congressman Amado Espino was identified as one of six government officials accused of illegal drug operations at the New Bilibid Prison. The drug matrix released by the government also linked Espino to illegal mining operations in Pangasinan. On September 27, 2016, President Duterte cleared Espino of the charges relating to the illegal drug trade, publicly apologized to him for the lapse in the validation of the intelligence report, but maintained that the charges of illegal mining against him and Pangasinan Administrator Rafael Baraan remain valid as the Sandiganbayan has already decided on the case. He later decided to leave his old party and joined PDP–Laban.

=== Black sand mining ===
On September 8, 2016, the Sandiganbayan ordered a 90-day suspension for Espino as Congressman of Pangasinan due to alleged black sand mining in the province.
