= Pangasinan Provincial Board =

Legislative body of the province of Pangasinan, Philippines

Pangasinan Provincial Board Sangguniang Panlalawigan ng Pangasinan

Type
- Type: Unicameral
- Term limits: 3 consecutive terms (9 years)

Leadership
- Presiding Officer: Mark Ronald DG. Lambino, Lakas–CMD since June 30, 2019

Structure
- Seats: 15 board members 1 ex officio presiding officer
- Political groups: Nacionalista (7) Lakas-CMD (1) NPC (1) API (1) Liberal (1) Independent (1) Nonpartisan (3)
- Length of term: 3 years
- Authority: Local Government Code of the Philippines

Elections
- Voting system: Multiple non-transferable vote (regular members); Indirect election (ex officio members)
- Last election: May 12, 2025
- Next election: May 15, 2028

Meeting place
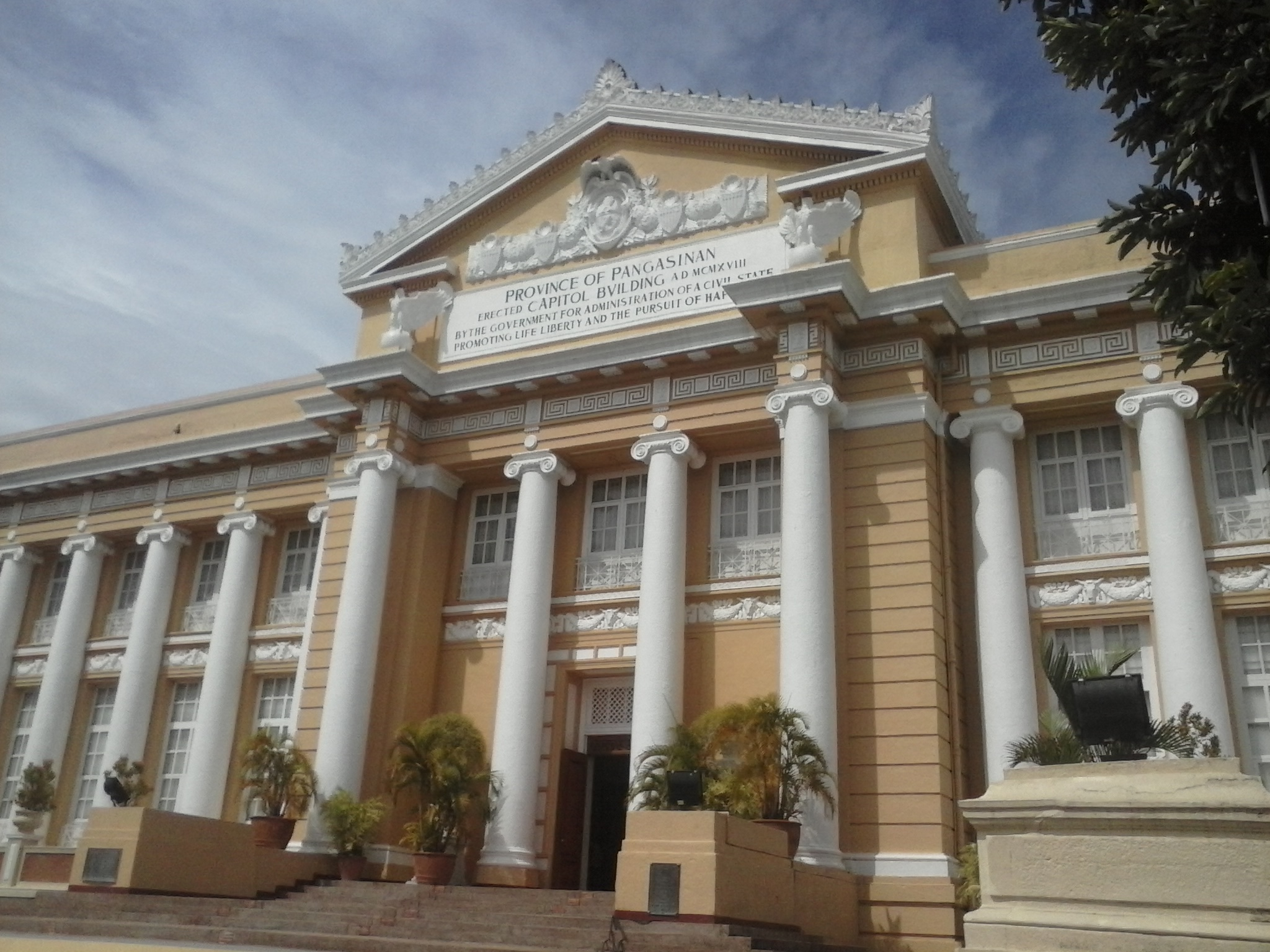
- Pangasinan Provincial Capitol, Lingayen

The Pangasinan Provincial Board is the Sangguniang Panlalawigan (provincial legislature) of the Philippine province of Pangasinan.

The members are elected via plurality-at-large voting: the province is divided into six districts, each having two seats. A voter votes up to two names, with the top two candidates per district being elected. The vice governor is the ex officio presiding officer, and only votes to break ties. The vice governor is elected via the plurality voting system province-wide.

The districts used in appropriation of members is coextensive with the legislative districts of Pangasinan.

Aside from the regular members, the board also includes the provincial federation presidents of the Liga ng mga Barangay (ABC, from its old name "Association of Barangay Captains"), the Sangguniang Kabataan (SK, youth councils) and the Philippine Councilors League (PCL).

== Apportionment ==
Elections	Seats per district						Ex officio seats	Total seats
Elections	1st	2nd	3rd	4th	5th	6th	Ex officio seats	Total seats
2010–present	2	2	2	2	2	2	3	15

== List of members ==
=== Current members ===
These are the members after the 2025 local elections and 2023 barangay and SK elections:

- Vice Governor: Mark Ronald DG. Lambino (Lakas)

Seat	Board member	Party	Assumed Office
1st district	Apolonia DG. Bacay	Nacionalista	June 30, 2022
1st district	Napoleon C. Fontelera Jr.	Nacionalista	June 30, 2022
2nd district	Philip Theodore E. Cruz	NPC	June 30, 2022
2nd district	Haidee S. Pacheco	Nacionalista	June 30, 2022
3rd district	Shiela Marie F. Baniqued	Nacionalista	June 30, 2022
3rd district	Vici Munda C. Ventanilla	Nacionalista	June 30, 2019
4th district	Marinor B. De Guzman	Nacionalista	June 30, 2022
4th district	Jerry Agerico B. Rosario	Nacionalista	June 30, 2022
5th district	Rosalina C. Apaga	API	June 30, 2025
5th district	Nicholi Jan Louie Q. Sison	Lakas	June 30, 2019
6th district	Noel R. Bince, Jr.	Independent	June 30, 2025
6th district	Ranjit R. Shahani	Liberal	June 30, 2025
ABC	Raul Sabangan	Nonpartisan	January 29, 2023
PCL	Kimberly G. Bandarlipe (Interim)	Nonpartisan	July 3, 2025
SK	Joyce Fernandez	Nonpartisan	January 1, 2023

=== Vice governor ===
Election year	Name	Party	Ref.
2013	Jose Ferdinand Z. Calimlim, Jr.	NPC	
2016	Jose Ferdinand Z. Calimlim, Jr.	Aksyon	
2019	Mark Ronald DG. Lambino	Kambilan	
2022	Mark Ronald DG. Lambino	Lakas	
2025	Mark Ronald DG. Lambino	Lakas	

=== 1st district ===
- Population (2024): 456,894

Election year	Member (party)	Member (party)	Ref.
2013	Napoleon C. Fontelera, Jr. (NPC)	Antonio Sison (NPC)	
2016	Napoleon C. Fontelera, Jr. (NPC)	Antonio Sison (NPC)	
2019	Donabel N. Fontelera (Nacionalista)	Margielou Orange D. Humalde-Verzosa (PDP–Laban)	
2022	Napoleon C. Fontelera, Jr. (Nacionalista)	Apolonia DG. Bacay (Nacionalista)	
2025	Napoleon C. Fontelera, Jr. (Nacionalista)	Apolonia DG. Bacay (Nacionalista)	

=== 2nd district ===
- Population (2024): 518,738

Election year	Member (party)	Member (party)	Ref.
2013	Raul P. Sison (NPC)	Nestor Reyes (NPC)	
2016	Raul P. Sison (Aksyon)	Nestor Reyes (Liberal)	
2019	Von Mark R. Mendoza (NPC)	Nestor Reyes (PDP–Laban)	
2022	Philip Theodore E. Cruz (NPC)	Haidee S. Pacheco (API)	
2025	Philip Theodore E. Cruz (NPC)	Haidee S. Pacheco (Nacionalista)	

=== 3rd district ===
- Population (2024): 713,514

Election year	Member (party)	Member (party)	Ref.
2013	Generoso D. Tulagan, Jr. (Liberal)	Angel Baniqued, Jr. (NPC)	
2016	Generoso D. Tulagan, Jr. (KBL)	Angel Baniqued, Jr. (Liberal)	
2019	Vici Munda C. Ventanilla (NPC)	Angel Baniqued, Jr. (PDP–Laban)	
2022	Vici Munda C. Ventanilla (NPC)	Shiela Marie F. Baniqued (API)	
2025	Vici Munda C. Ventanilla (NPC)	Shiela Marie F. Baniqued (Nacionalista)	

=== 4th district ===
- Population (2024): 497,112 (Note: Dagupan included; 322,335 if excluded.)

Election year	Member (party)	Member (party)	Ref.
2013	Mojamito R. Libunao Jr. (NPC)	Liberato Villegas (Liberal)	
2016	Jeremy Agerico B. Rosario (Liberal)	Liberato Villegas (Liberal)	
2019	Jeremy Agerico B. Rosario (PDP–Laban)	Liberato Villegas (PDP–Laban)	
2022	Jerry Agerico B. Rosario (API)	Marinor B. de Guzman (API)	
2025	Jerry Agerico B. Rosario (Nacionalista)	Marinor B. de Guzman (Nacionalista)	

=== 5th district ===
- Population (2024): 528,814

Election year	Member (party)	Member (party)	Ref.
2013	Danilo C. Uy (NPC)	Clemente B. Arboleda, Jr. (NPC)	
2016	Rosary Gracia Perez-Talaba (NPC)	Clemente B. Arboleda, Jr. (NPC)	
2019	Rosary Gracia Perez-Talaba (PDP–Laban)	Nicholi Jan Louie Q. Sison (Lakas)	
2022	Rosary Gracia Perez-Talaba (API)	Nicholi Jan Louie Q. Sison (API)	
2025	Rosalina C. Apaga (API)	Nicholi Jan Louie Q. Sison (Lakas)	

=== 6th district ===
- Population (2024): 473,468

Election year	Member (party)	Member (party)	Ref.
2013	Ranjit R. Shahani (Liberal)	Alfonso C. Bince (NPC)	
2016	Salvador S. Perez, Jr. (NPC)	Noel C. Bince (Liberal)	
2019	Salvador S. Perez, Jr. (PDP–Laban)	Noel C. Bince (PDP–Laban)	
2022	Salvador S. Perez, Jr. (API)	Noel C. Bince (API)	
2025	Ranjit R. Shahani (Liberal)	Noel R. Bince, Jr. (Independent)	
