= Agno, Pangasinan =

Municipality in Pangasinan, Philippines

Agno
- Municipality
- Municipality of Agno
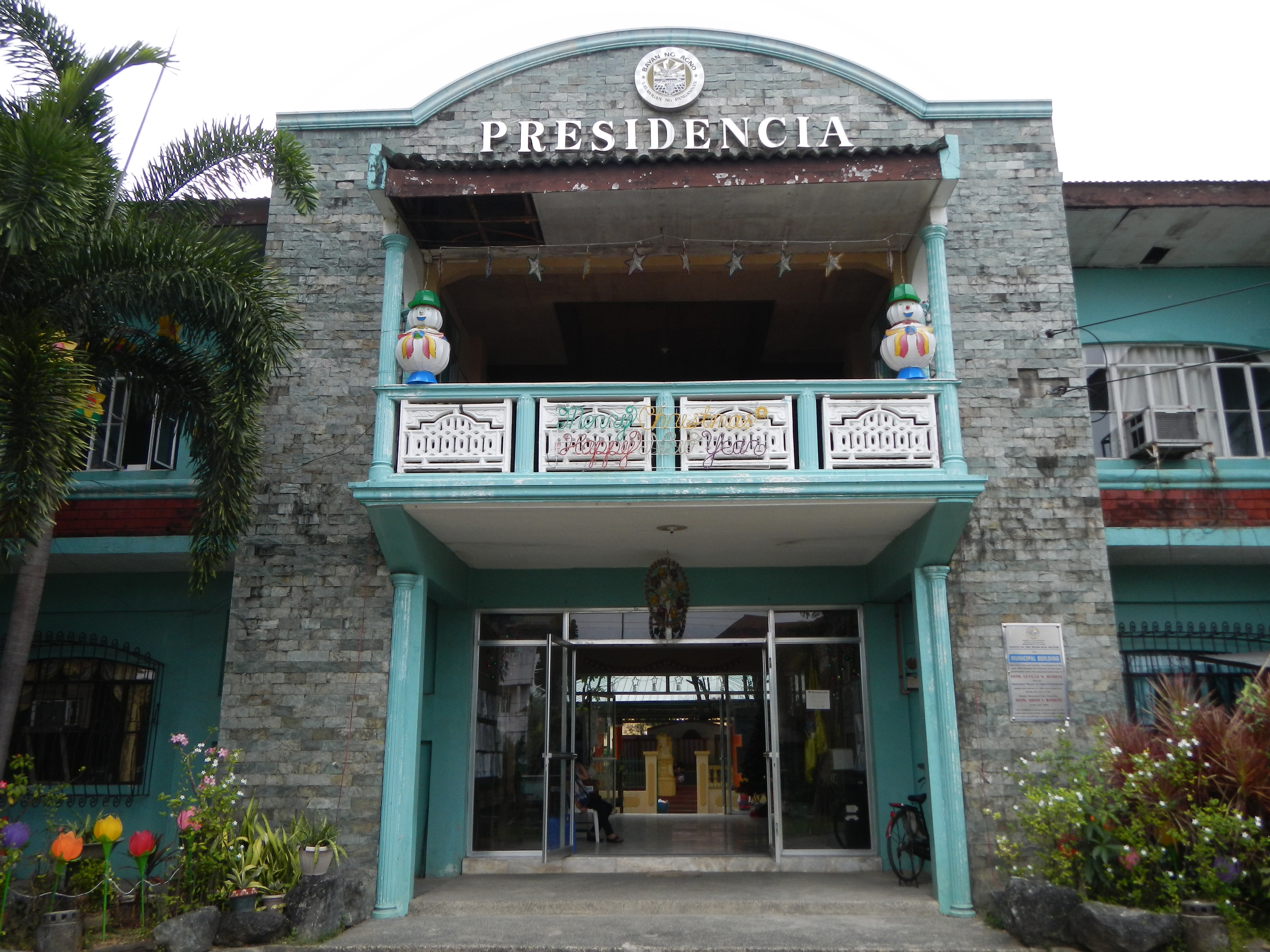
- Presidencia Agno Pangasinan

- Seal

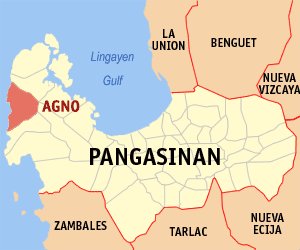
- Map of Pangasinan with Agno highlighted
- Interactive map of Agno
- Location within the Philippines
- Coordinates: 16°06′58″N 119°48′10″E
- Country: Philippines
- Region: Ilocos Region
- Province: Pangasinan
- District: 1st district
- Founded: November 25, 1791
- Barangays: 17 (see Barangays)

Government
  - Type: Sangguniang Bayan
  - Mayor: John N. Celeste (NPC)
  - Vice Mayor: Jonathan G. Doromal (API)
  - Representative: Arthur F. Celeste (NP)
  - Municipal Council: Members: Jefferlyn P. Dela Concha (API); Jhon Lester N. Natividad (API); Kristine N. Feble (API); Larry P. Sagun (API); Edilberto C. Manalastas (API); Micah Alvin S. Gimelo (API); Lorna N. Nivera (API); Obed N. Sison (NPC)
  - Electorate: 21,085 voters (2025)

Area
  - Total: 169.75 km^{2} (65.54 sq mi)
- Elevation: 43 m (141 ft)
- Highest elevation: 140 m (460 ft)
- Lowest elevation: 0 m (0 ft)

Population (2024 census)
  - Total: 29,270
  - Density: 172.4/km^{2} (446.6/sq mi)
  - Households: 7,382

Economy
  - Income class: 2nd municipal income class
  - Poverty incidence: 18.44% (2023)
  - Revenue: ₱ 183.3 million (2024)
  - Assets: ₱ 436.7 million (2024)
  - Expenditure: ₱ 162.1 million (2024)
  - Liabilities: ₱ 48.35 million (2024)

Service provider
  - Electricity: Pangasinan 1 Electric Cooperative (PANELCO 1)
- Time zone: UTC+8 (PST)
- ZIP code: 2408
- PSGC: 0105501000
- IDD : area code: +63 (0)75
- Native languages: Pangasinan; Ilocano; Tagalog; Sambal
- Website: www.agno.gov.ph

Agno, officially the Municipality of Agno (Pangasinan: Baley na Agno; Ilocano: Ili ti Agno; Sambal: Babali nin Agno; Tagalog: Bayan ng Agno), is a municipality in the province of Pangasinan, Philippines. According to the 2024 census, it has a population of 29,270 people.

== Etymology ==
The name Agno was derived from the fruit, mango (Tagalog: mangga), and a species of swamp tree called “cited agnus-castus”, a chaste tree used for medicinal concoctions to relieve pain and illness. It was known to be abundant in the area. Over time, the name “Agno” was retained and adopted as the official name of the town.

== History ==
Agno was formally established as a municipality in 1791. During the Spanish and early American periods, it was part of the province of Zambales.

On October 15, 1903, by virtue of Act No. 945, entitled “An Act Reducing the Twenty-five Municipalities of the Province of Zambales to Fifteen,” while still part of the Province of Zambales, the municipality of Agno retained its existing boundaries.

On November 30, 1903, by virtue of Act No. 1004, the municipalities of Bolinao, Alaminos, San Isidro (Burgos), and Infanta were annexed to the Province of Pangasinan.

On December 19, 1903, by virtue of Act No. 1029, Act No. 1004 was amended to include the municipalities of Anda, Bani, and Agno among those annexed to the Province of Pangasinan.

== Geography ==
The Municipality of Agno is characterized by rolling terrain and rainfed rice fields. Near the poblacion, or town plaza, the road passes along the Mabini river or (Balincaguing River), which drains into the South China Sea further west. The town plaza is home to a centuries-old Roman Catholic church, as well as one of the first congregations of the Philippine Independent Church. The town shares borders with the town of Bani to the north, the town of Mabini and Alaminos to the east and with Burgos to the south. Contrary to popular belief, the Agno River does not pass this municipality.

Agno is situated 68.34 kilometres (42.46 mi) from the provincial capital Lingayen, and 277.27 kilometres (172.29 mi) from the country's capital city of Manila.

=== Barangays ===
Agno is politically subdivided into 17 barangays. Each barangay consists of puroks and some have sitios.

- Allabon
- Aloleng
- Bangan-Oda
- Baruan
- Boboy
- Cayungnan
- Dangley
- Gayusan
- Macaboboni
- Magsaysay
- Namatucan
- Patar
- Poblacion East
- Poblacion West
- San Juan
- Tupa
- Viga

=== Climate ===
Climate data for Agno, Pangasinan
Month	Jan	Feb	Mar	Apr	May	Jun	Jul	Aug	Sep	Oct	Nov	Dec	Year
Mean daily maximum °C (°F)	31 (88)	31 (88)	32 (90)	34 (93)	35 (95)	34 (93)	32 (90)	32 (90)	32 (90)	32 (90)	32 (90)	31 (88)	32 (90)
Mean daily minimum °C (°F)	22 (72)	22 (72)	22 (72)	24 (75)	24 (75)	24 (75)	24 (75)	24 (75)	24 (75)	23 (73)	23 (73)	22 (72)	23 (74)
Average precipitation mm (inches)	13.6 (0.54)	10.4 (0.41)	18.2 (0.72)	15.7 (0.62)	178.4 (7.02)	227.9 (8.97)	368.0 (14.49)	306.6 (12.07)	310.6 (12.23)	215.7 (8.49)	70.3 (2.77)	31.1 (1.22)	1,766.5 (69.55)
Average rainy days	3	2	2	4	14	16	23	21	24	15	10	6	140
Source: World Weather Online

== Demographics ==
Population Census of Agno
Year	Pop.	±% p.a.
1903	6,169	—
1918	7,536	+1.34%
1939	9,533	+1.13%
1948	12,485	+3.04%
1960	13,424	+0.61%
1970	15,216	+1.26%
1975	16,011	+1.03%
1980	17,241	+1.49%
1990	21,197	+2.09%
1995	23,326	+1.81%
2000	25,077	+1.56%
2007	26,023	+0.51%
2010	27,508	+2.04%
2015	28,052	+0.37%
2020	29,947	+1.39%
2024	29,270	−0.55%
Source: Philippine Statistics Authority

== Economy ==
Poverty incidence of Agno (%)

Source: Philippine Statistics Authority

The town's main livelihood is fishing and agriculture, although a number of her sons and daughters work as doctors, physical therapist, nurses, engineers, computer programmers and accountants in numerous countries around the globe. On top of that, the town produces successful teachers, policemen and policewomen, and lawyers.

During the summer months of April and May the town's market abounds with fresh fruits such as mangoes and duhat, as well as fresh catch such as tuna, flying fish, grouper, lobsters and other seafood.

=== Tourism ===
The town is home to natural attractions such as the Mabini river, the Umbrella Rocks in Sabangan, as well as several beaches, Agno Beach being the longest and most popular. There are several other beaches hidden along the coast such as the Macaboboni cove (which features a small cave) as well as a white beach in Barangay Gayusan. To the southern end of Agno Beach, one can dive from a two-story-high rock amidst crashing waves and end up in a beautiful coral garden below.

== Government ==
=== Local government ===
Agno, belonging to the first congressional district of the province of Pangasinan, is governed by a mayor designated as its local chief executive and by a municipal council as its legislative body in accordance with the Local Government Code. The mayor, vice mayor, and the councilors are elected directly by the people through an election which is being held every three years.

=== Elected officials ===
Members of the Agno Municipal Government (2025-2028)
Position	Name
Congressman	Arthur F. Celeste (NP)
Municipal Mayor	John N. Celeste (NPC)
Municipal Vice-Mayor	Jonathan G. Doromal (API)
Municipal Councilors	Jefferlyn P. Dela Concha (API)
Municipal Councilors	Jhon Lester N. Natividad (API)
Municipal Councilors	Kristine N. Feble (API)
Municipal Councilors	Larry P. Sagun (API)
Municipal Councilors	Edilberto C. Manalastas (API)
Municipal Councilors	Micah Alvin S. Gimelo (API)
Municipal Councilors	Lorna N. Nivera (API)
Municipal Councilors	Obed N. Sison (NPC)

== Education ==
The Agno Schools District Office governs all educational institutions within the municipality. It oversees the management and operations of all private and public elementary and high schools.

=== Primary and elementary schools ===
- Agno Central School
- Allabon Elementary School
- Aloleng Elementary School
- Aroas Elementary School
- Bani UMC Precious Learners Center
- Baruan Elementary School
- Calomboyan Elementary School
- Cayungnan Elementary School
- Creative Gems Learning Center
- Dasol UMC Learning Center
- Don A. Evangelista Memorial Elementary School
- Eastern Gate Christian Academy
- Emmanuel's Way Educational Institutions
- Great Heritage School of Sta. Barbara
- First Asian Learning Center of Northern Luzon
- Harvent School Foundation
- Horizon Educational Learning Centre
- JN Montessori and High School
- Juan Niño Elementary School
- Justice Potenciano P. Pecson Elementary School
- Macaboboni Elementary School
- Mother Lourdes Learning School
- Namatucan Elementary School
- Patar Elementary School
- Precious Dream School
- PSU-Infanta Laborary School
- Rev. Teodorico A. Vidal Christian School
- San Juan Elementary School
- Silvery Christian Academy
- Sunbeam Methodist Christian School
- The United Methodist Church Agno Kiddie School
- Tupa Elementary School
- Urbiztondo Catholic School
- Viga Elementary School

=== Secondary schools ===
- Abagatanen Integrated School
- Agno National High School
- Bangan-Oda National High School
- Gayusan Integrated School
- Mapita Integrated School

=== Higher educational institutions ===
- Lingayen Technological Institute
- Señor Tesoro College
- Philippine College of Science and Technology
