= Ramon Guico III =

Filipino politician (born 1975)

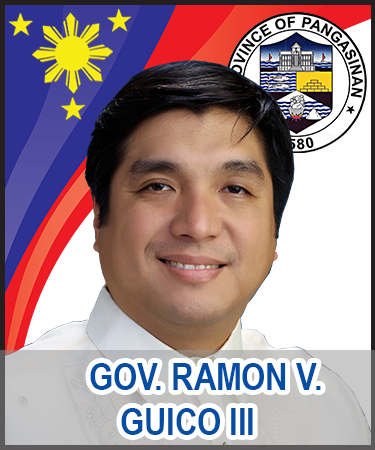

31st Governor of Pangasinan
- Incumbent
- Assumed office June 30, 2022
- Vice Governor: Mark Lambino
- Preceded by: Amado Espino III

Member of the Philippine House of Representatives from Pangasinan's 5th district
- In office June 30, 2019 – June 30, 2022
- Preceded by: Amado Espino Jr.
- Succeeded by: Ramon Guico Jr.

Mayor of Binalonan
- In office June 30, 2010 – June 30, 2019
- Preceded by: Ramon Guico Jr.
- Succeeded by: Ramon Guico Jr.

Vice Mayor of Binalonan
- In office June 30, 2007 – June 30, 2010

Personal details
- Born: Ramon Velicaria Guico III; March 19, 1975 (age 51) Quezon City, Philippines
- Party: Nacionalista (2021–present)
- Other political affiliations: Lakas (2007–2021)
- Spouse: Maan Tuazon (m. 2010)
- Children: 4
- Parent(s): Ramon Naval Guico; Arlyn Grace V. Guico
- Education: University of the Philippines Diliman (BA, CPE, MA); Pamantasan ng Lungsod ng Maynila (D.P.M)
- Occupation: Politician

Ramon "Mon-Mon" Velicaria Guico III (born March 19, 1975) is a Filipino politician who has served as the 31st governor of Pangasinan since 2022. Prior to his governorship, he served as representative for Pangasinan's fifth district from 2019 to 2022 and as the mayor of Binalonan from 2010 to 2019.

== Life and career ==
Guico was born on March 19, 1975, in Quezon City, Philippines. His father, Ramon Guico Jr., is a former Municipal Mayor of Binalonan and the National President of the League of Municipalities of the Philippines from 2001 to 2010. His mother is Arlyn Grace V. Guico, a pharmacist and President/CEO of WorldCiti Medical Hospital.

He attended Ateneo de Manila University in high school (1993). He obtained his bachelor's degree in Philosophy (1997), Certificate in Professional Education, and Master's degree in Education (2004) from the University of the Philippines Diliman. He also earned a doctorate degree in Public Management from the Pamantasan ng Lungsod ng Maynila in 2005. He also pursued his interest in aviation and aeronautics and turned it into a profession by becoming a licensed commercial pilot.

== Personal life ==
Guico and his wife, Maan Tuazon, have four children.

Political offices
Preceded by Amado Espino III	Governor of Pangasinan; 2022–present	Incumbent
Preceded by Ramon Guico Jr.	Mayor of Binalonan; 2010–2019	Succeeded by Ramon Guico Jr.
House of Representatives of the Philippines
Preceded by Amado Espino Jr.	Member of the House of Representatives from Pangasinan's 5th district 2019–2022	Succeeded by Ramon Guico Jr.
