= Abante Pangasinan–Ilokano Party =

Local political party in the Philippines

Abante Pangasinan-Ilokano
- — Philippine partylist —
- Full name: Abante Pangasinan-Ilokano Party
- Abbreviation: API
- Chairperson: Amado Espino, Jr.
- President: Amado Espino III
- Secretary: Michael Morden
- Type: Regional party
- Founders: Amado Espino Jr.; Amado Espino III; Luzerfeda Pascual; Jose Ferdinand Calimlim; Nelson Gayo; Modesto Operana; Danielo dela Cruz; Angel Baniqued
- COMELEC accreditation: September 29, 2021; 4 years ago
- Headquarters: API Party, Socony, Salasa, Bugallon, Pangasinan 2416
- Ideology: Regionalism (Pangasinan)
- Colors: Red

The Abante Pangasinan Ilokano Party (API) is a political party and party-list organization in the Philippines, primarily based in the province of Pangasinan. It seeks to represent both Pangasinense and Ilokano communities and is active in local and national politics, particularly through participation in the House of Representatives under the party-list system.

== History ==
=== 2022 elections ===
In the 2022 Philippine general elections, the party garnered 451,372 votes, earning one seat in the 19th congress. Amado Espino III, the party's president, ran for a third term as Pangasinan's governor but lost to outgoing 5th district representative Ramon Guico III.

=== 2025 elections ===
In the 2025 elections, the party failed to earn a seat in the House.

== Electoral results ==
Election	Votes	%	Secured Seats	Party-List Seats	Congress	1st Representative	2nd Representative	3rd Representative
2022	451,372	1.28%	1 / 3	63	19th Congress; 2022–2025	Michael Morden	—N/a	—N/a
2025	170,795	0.43%	0 / 3	63	20th Congress; 2025–2028	—N/a	—N/a	—N/a
