= 2019 Pangasinan local elections =

Local elections in the Philippines

- May 13, 2019
- Registered: 1,946,692
- Turnout: 80.29% (▼4.82 pp)
- Gubernatorial election
- Registered: 1,827,528 (Note: Excluding Dagupan City)
- Turnout: 80.08%
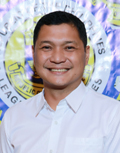

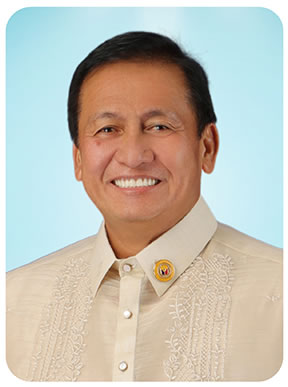
Candidate	Amado Espino III	Arthur Celeste
Party	PDP–Laban	Nacionalista
Running mate	Angel Baniqued Sr.	Mark Lambino
Popular vote	781,307	582,380
Percentage	57.3%	42.7%

Espino 50–60% 60–70% 70–80% 80–90%	Celeste 50–60% 60–70% 80–90%	N/A
Governor before election
Amado Espino III
Aksyon
Elected Governor
Amado Espino III
PDP–Laban
- Vice gubernatorial election
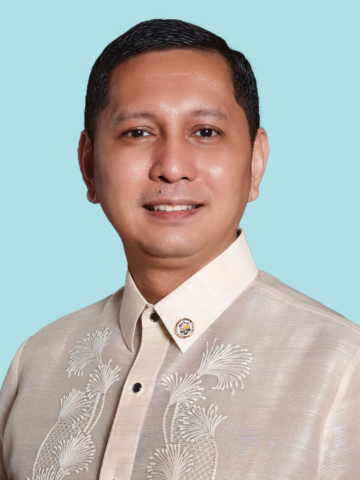

Candidate	Mark Lambino	Angel Baniqued Sr.
Party	NPC	PDP–Laban
Popular vote	716,010	499,330
Percentage	58.7%	41.3%

Lambino 50–60% 60–70% 70–80% 80–90%	Baniqued 50–60% 60–70% 70–80%	N/A
Vice Governor before election
Ferdie Calimlim
Aksyon
Elected Vice Governor
Mark Lambino
NPC

Local elections were held in the province of Pangasinan on May 13, 2019 as part of the 2019 Philippine general election. Pangasinan voters will elect a governor, a vice governor, 6 members of the House of Representatives that will represent the 6 congressional districts of the province, and 12 out of 15 members of the Pangasinan Provincial Board. The officials elected will assume their respective offices on June 30, 2019, for a three-year-long term.

== Electoral system ==
Local elections in the Philippines are held every second Monday of May starting in 1992 and every three years thereafter. Single-seat positions (governor, vice governor, and House representative) are elected via first-past-the-post-voting. The governor and vice governor are elected by the province at-large, while the House representative and provincial board members are elected per district.

provincial board elections are done via plurality block voting; Pangsinan is divided into six districts, with each district sending two board members. There are three other ex officio seats, the president of the Philippine Councilors’ League, the president of the Association of Barangay Captains, and the president of the Sangguniang Kabataan (SK) Provincial Federation; these will be determined later in the year at the barangay and Sangguniang Kabataan elections.

== Campaign ==
=== Vote buying ===
During the 2019 Philippine general elections, several incidents of vote-buying were reported in Pangasinan. In Barangay Buer, Aguilar, four individuals were arrested after authorities confiscated around ₱443,300 in cash, along with sample ballots and flyers bearing the names of local candidates. The suspects were turned over to the National Bureau of Investigation (NBI) in Dagupan City for case filing, while barangay officials were invited for questioning. Incumbent Governor Amado Espino III and Representative Amado Espino Jr. denied any involvement, calling the incident a smear tactic against their campaign.

Nationwide, the Philippine National Police (PNP) reported that around 147 individuals were arrested for allegedly buying or selling votes, with several cases traced to Pangasinan and other regions. The PNP said the arrests formed part of its intensified operations to maintain election integrity.

== Governor ==
Candidates listed according to COMELEC.

Espino defeated incumbent Alaminos City Mayor Arthur Celeste with 782,073 votes. Celeste only got 582,872 votes.

=== Candidates ===
- Amado Espino III (PDP-Laban), governor of Pangasinan (2016–2019)
- Arthur Celeste (NP), Mayor of Alaminos City (2013–2019)

=== Results ===
Candidate	Party	Votes	%
Amado Espino III (incumbent)	PDP-Laban	781,307	57.29
Arthur Celeste	Nacionalista	582,380	42.71
Total		1,363,687	100.00
Registered voters/turnout		1,705,260	–
PDP-Laban hold			

=== Per City/Municipality ===
City/Municipality	Amado Espino III		Arthur Celeste	
City/Municipality	Votes	%	Votes	%
Agno	7,066	51.55	6,641	48.45
Aguilar	11,556	54.34	9,709	45.66
Alaminos	15,359	36.19	27,083	63.81
Alcala	16,689	76.51	5,125	23.49
Anda	8,273	43.57	10,716	56.43
Asingan	19,428	67.2	9,483	32.8
Balungao	9,877	65.21	5,269	34.79
Bani	11,046	47.88	12,025	52.12
Basista	12,899	74.15	4,497	25.85
Bautista	13,726	85.24	2,377	14.76
Bayambang	25,916	45.23	31,386	54.77
Binalonan	13,612	52.15	12,491	47.85
Binmaley	28,412	60.64	18,443	39.36
Bolinao	5,823	18.15	26,258	81.85
Bugallon	21,223	60.81	13,675	39.19
Burgos	5,787	59.47	3,944	40.53
Calasiao	27,884	57.55	20,564	42.45
Dasol	8,808	52.03	8,120	47.97
Infanta	5,735	47.81	6,260	52.19
Labrador	8,372	58.53	5,931	41.47
Laoac	11,021	69.46	4,845	30.54
Lingayen	31,845	63.33	18,442	36.67
Mabini	7,368	58.21	5,289	41.79
Malasiqui	34,090	58.98	23,705	41.02
Manaoag	17,671	52.75	15,830	47.25
Mangaldan	25,485	51.46	24,041	48.54
Mangatarem	22,732	56.76	17,319	43.24
Mapandan	12,642	69.28	5,607	30.72
Natividad	8,118	61.50	5,082	38.50
Pozorrubio	18,969	54.23	16,007	45.77
Rosales	18,099	55.44	14,546	44.56
San Carlos	51,958	64.68	28,372	35.32
San Fabian	19,873	52.24	18,168	47.76
San Jacinto	10,930	53.56	9,477	46.44
San Manuel	17,259	80.55	4,168	19.45
San Nicolas	13,960	71.07	5,682	28.93
San Quintin	10,350	60.33	6,806	39.67
Santa Barbara	23,218	58.43	16,518	41.57
Santa Maria	8,499	51.53	7,995	48.47
Santo Tomas	3,858	60.02	2,570	39.98
Tayug	11,491	57.47	8,504	42.53
Sison	12,191	53.64	10,537	46.36
Sual	10,507	48.77	11,038	51.23
Umingan	24,099	62.74	14,313	37.26
Urbiztondo	18,521	67.48	8,924	32.52
Urdaneta	35,811	54.52	29,876	45.48
Villasis	23,251	72.72	8,722	27.28
TOTAL	781,307	57.29	582,380	42.71

=== Per Legislative District ===
District	Amado Espino III		Arthur Celeste	
District	Votes	%	Votes	%
1st	85,772	42.22	117,374	57.78
2nd	155,560	61.61	96,940	38.39
3rd	175,708	58.21	126,152	41.79
4th	73,959	52.28	67,516	47.72
5th	149,128	61.71	92,550	38.29
6th	141,180	63.30	81,848	36.70

== Vice Governor ==
Mark Lambino defeated Angel Baniqued Sr. with 716,010 votes to 499,330.

Candidate	Party	Votes	%
Mark Lambino	NPC	716,010	58.91
Angel Baniqued Sr.	PDP-Laban	499,330	41.09
Total		1,215,340	100.00
Registered voters/turnout		1,705,260	–
NPC gain from Aksyon			

=== Per City/Municipality ===
City/Municipality	Mark Lambino		Angel Baniqued Sr.	
City/Municipality	Votes	%	Votes	%
Agno	6,560	59.36	4,491	40.64
Aguilar	12,942	68.65	5,909	31.35
Alaminos	28,180	73.72	10,046	26.28
Alcala	10,816	57.71	7,927	42.29
Anda	11,191	70.03	4,790	29.97
Asingan	13,805	57.43	10,234	42.57
Balungao	6,763	52.52	6,115	47.48
Bani	13,006	64.84	7,052	35.16
Basista	6,280	41.71	8,777	58.29
Bautista	4,903	34.41	9,346	65.59
Bayambang	29,088	53.92	24,856	46.08
Binalonan	17,088	76.81	5,160	23.19
Binmaley	23,715	56.35	18,368	43.65
Bolinao	23,829	86.98	3,567	13.02
Bugallon	17,576	57.22	13,139	42.78
Burgos	4,753	57.99	3,443	42.01
Calasiao	18,535	40.96	26,716	59.04
Dasol	8,646	61.06	5,514	38.94
Infanta	6,513	65.36	3,452	34.64
Labrador	7,577	62.79	4,491	37.21
Laoac	7,234	50.46	7,101	49.54
Lingayen	27,695	62.21	16,823	37.79
Mabini	6,708	60.36	4,405	39.64
Malasiqui	23,852	44.66	29,559	55.34
Manaoag	21,288	71.36	8,544	28.64
Mangaldan	40,861	83.53	8,056	16.47
Mangatarem	23,185	65.01	12,478	34.99
Mapandan	8,309	47.76	9,087	52.24
Natividad	5,579	47.55	6,153	52.45
Pozorrubio	25,904	78.62	7,044	21.38
Rosales	19,088	68.64	8,721	31.36
San Carlos	21,960	29.61	52,211	70.39
San Fabian	22,268	64.85	12,072	35.15
San Jacinto	13,222	71.35	5,308	28.65
San Manuel	9,209	51.25	8,760	48.75
San Nicolas	7,244	41.06	10,399	58.94
San Quintin	8,729	57.88	6,351	42.12
Santa Barbara	17,203	46.80	19,557	53.20
Santa Maria	9,816	66.42	4,962	33.58
Santo Tomas	3,588	63.48	2,064	36.52
Sison	14,921	74.80	5,027	25.20
Sual	11,265	60.42	7,381	39.58
Tayug	8,686	51.40	8,214	48.60
Umingan	16,181	48.30	17,321	51.70
Urbiztondo	12,973	54.94	10,642	45.06
Urdaneta	43,485	77.00	12,990	23.00
Villasis	13,791	48.39	14,707	51.61
TOTAL	880,348	61.5	552,212	38.5

=== Per Legislative District ===
District	Mark Lambino		Angel Baniqued Sr.	
District	Votes	%	Votes	%
1st	120,651	69.03	54,141	30.97
2nd	131,943	59.28	90,627	40.72
3rd	118,947	42.34	161,986	57.66
4th	97,639	74.18	33,980	25.82
5th	141,730	66.51	71,366	33.49
6th	105,100	54.65	87,230	45.35

== Provincial Board ==
The Pangasinan Provincial Board is composed of 15 board members, 12 of whom are elected.

=== Results ===
Party	Votes	%	Seats
PDP-Laban	1,062,393	56.82	8
Nationalist People's Coalition	371,034	19.84	2
Nacionalista Party	261,220	13.97	1
Lakas-CMD	168,987	9.04	1
Independent	47,563	2.54	0
Ex officio seats			3
Total	1,911,197	100.00	15

=== First district ===
Pangasinan's 1st provincial district consists of the same area as Pangasinan's 1st legislative district. Two board members are elected from this provincial district.

==== Results ====
Candidate	Party	Votes	%
Donabel Fontelera	Nacionalista Party	107,150	35.99
Orange Humilde-Verzosa	PDP-Laban	73,836	24.80
Antonio Sison (incumbent)	Nacionalista Party	67,705	22.74
Ricky Camba	PDP-Laban	49,040	16.47
Total		297,731	100.00

=== 2nd provincial district ===
Pangasinan's 2nd provincial district consists of the same area as Pangasinan's 2nd legislative district. Two board members are elected from this provincial district.

==== Results ====
Candidate	Party	Votes	%
Nikiboy Reyes (incumbent)	PDP-Laban	145,131	35.46
Von Mark Mendoza	Nationalist People's Coalition	101,605	24.82
Haidee Soriano	PDP-Laban	85,015	20.77
Maan Verzosa	Independent	40,342	9.86
Arsenio Merrera	Nationalist People's Coalition	37,231	9.10
Total		409,324	100.00

=== 3rd provincial district ===
Pangasinan's 3rd provincial district consists of the same area as Pangasinan's 3rd legislative district. Two board members are elected from this provincial district.

==== Results ====
Candidate	Party	Votes	%
Vici Ventanilla	Nationalist People's Coalition	172,646	34.49
Angel Baniqued Jr. (incumbent)	PDP-Laban	139,303	27.83
Generoso Tulagan Jr. (incumbent)	Nationalist People's Coalition	94,982	18.98
Darwina Sampang	Nacionalista Party	86,365	17.26
Eduardo Gonzales	Independent	7,221	1.44
Total		500,517	100.00

=== 4th provincial district ===
Pangasinan's 4th provincial district consists of the same area as Pangasinan's 4th legislative district, excluding the city of Dagupan. Two board members are elected from this provincial district.

==== Results ====
Candidate	Party	Votes	%
Jeremy Rosario (incumbent)	PDP-Laban	68,680	35.01
Liberato Villegas	PDP-Laban	67,967	34.64
Kap Richie Abalos	Nationalist People's Coalition	59,552	30.35
Total		196,199	100.00

=== 5th provincial district ===
Pangasinan's 5th provincial district consists of the same area as Pangasinan's 5th legislative district. Two board members are elected from this provincial district.

==== Results ====
Candidate	Party	Votes	%
Chinky Perez (incumbent)	PDP-Laban	150,726	40.06
Nicholi Jan Louie Sison	Lakas	108,653	28.88
Onofre Gorospre	Lakas	60,334	16.03
Atty. Francis Tinio	PDP-Laban	56,555	15.03
Total		376,268	100.00

=== 6th provincial district ===
Pangasinan's 6th provincial district consists of the same area as Pangasinan's 6th legislative district. Two board members are elected from this provincial district.

==== Results ====
Candidate	Party	Votes	%
Noel Bince (incumbent)	PDP-Laban	127,118	56.21
Salvador Perez Jr. (incumbent)	PDP-Laban	99,022	43.79
Total		226,140	100.00

== House of Representatives Elections ==
=== First District ===
Noli Celeste runs to replace Jesus Celeste, his sibling. Noli is challenged by Thomas Orbos.

==== Results ====
Candidate	Party	Votes	%
Noli Celeste	Nacionalista	101,024	51.57
Thomas Orbos	PDP-Laban	93,476	47.72
Ernesto Regaspi	Independent	1,394	0.71
Total		195,894	100.00
Nacionalista gain from NPC			

==== Results per city/municipality ====
City/municipality	Noli Celeste		Thomas Orbos		Ernesto Regaspi	
City/municipality	Votes	%	Votes	%	Votes	%
Agno	5,423	39.86	8,111	59.61	72	0.53
Alaminos City	19,310	47.97	20,560	51.07	387	0.96
Anda	9,264	51.09	8,755	48.28	113	0.62
Bani	9,721	42.44	13,117	57.27	65	0.28
Bolinao	25,553	80.34	6,102	19.18	153	0.48
Burgos	3,513	37.74	5,724	61.50	71	0.76
Dasol	7,908	48.72	8,233	50.72	92	0.57
Infanta	5,918	51.63	5,396	47.08	148	1.29
Mabini	4,589	37.75	7,498	61.69	68	0.56
Sual	10,035	48.82	10,290	50.06	229	1.11
Total	101,024	51.57	93,476	47.72	1,394	0.71

First District Results

Vote %

0–10%
10–20%
30–40%
40–50%
50–60%
60–70%
80–90%

=== Second District ===
Bugallon Mayor Jumel Anthony Espino defeated board member Raul Sison.

Results

Candidate	Party	Votes	%
Jumel Espino	PDP-Laban	129,371	52.19
Raul Sison	Nacionalista	109,639	44.23
Butch Merrera	Independent	8,864	3.58
Total		247,874	100.00
PDP-Laban gain from Liberal Party			

==== Results per city/municipality ====
City/municipality	Jumel Espino		Raul Sison		Butch Merrera	
City/municipality	Votes	%	Votes	%	Votes	%
Aguilar	9,834	47.21	10,597	50.87	399	1.92
Basista	10,705	61.19	6,579	37.61	211	1.21
Binmaley	21,897	48.51	18,546	41.09	4,692	10.40
Bugallon	20,676	60.32	13,033	38.02	567	1.65
Labrador	7,351	52.76	6,307	45.27	275	1.97
Lingayen	25,856	52.69	21,655	44.13	1,557	3.17
Mangatarem	19,040	48.39	19,414	49.34	895	2.27
Urbiztondo	14,012	50.42	13,508	48.61	268	0.96
Total	129,371	52.19	109,639	44.23	8,864	3.58

Second District Results

Vote %

0–10%
10–20%
30–40%
40–50%
50–60%
60–70%

=== Third District ===
Rose Marie "Baby" Arenas runs for her 3rd term as congresswoman.

Results

Candidate	Party	Votes	%
Rose Marie "Baby" Arenas	PDP-Laban	242,465	83.67
Felipe Devera	NUP	41,653	14.37
Jaime Aquino	Independent	5,655	1.95
Total		289,773	100.00
PDP-Laban hold			

==== Results per city/municipality ====
City/municipality	Rose Marie "Baby" Arenas		Felipe Devera		Jaime Aquino	
City/municipality	Votes	%	Votes	%	Votes	%
Bayambang	51,609	93.09	3,030	5.47	798	1.44
Calasiao	27,458	58.26	19,039	40.40	634	1.35
San Carlos City	69,425	89.64	6,412	8.28	1,610	2.08
Malasiqui	50,191	90.16	4,520	8.12	959	1.72
Mapandan	14,306	85.19	1,711	10.19	776	4.62
Santa Barbara	29,476	79.03	6,941	18.61	878	2.35
Total	242,465	83.89	41,653	14.41	5,655	1.70

Third District Results

Vote %

0–10%
10–20%
40–50%
50–60%
70–80%
80–90%
90–100%

=== Fourth District ===
Christopher de Venecia runs for a 2nd term as congressman.

Results

Candidate	Party	Votes	%
Christopher de Venecia	Lakas-CMD	166,917	73.22
Alipio Fernandez	Independent	43,718	19.18
Red Erfe-Mejia	Independent	15,655	6.87
Winky Manaois	Independent	1,680	0.74
Total		227,970	100.00
Lakas-CMD hold			

==== Results per city/municipality ====
City/municipality	Christopher de Venecia		Alipio Fernandez		Red Erfe-Mejia		Winky Manaois	
City/municipality	Votes	%	Votes	%	Votes	%	Votes	%
Dagupan City	54,574	60.15	21,676	23.89	13,500	14.88	984	1.08
Manaoag	26,013	82.35	4,983	15.77	428	1.35	164	0.52
Mangaldan	41,531	84.45	6,641	13.50	759	1.54	245	0.50
San Fabian	29,318	79.47	6,683	18.12	697	1.89	192	0.52
San Jacinto	15,481	79.06	3,735	19.07	271	1.38	95	0.49
Total	166,917	73.22	43,718	19.18	15,655	6.87	1,680	0.74

Fourth District Results

Vote %

0–10%
10–20%
20–30%
60–70%
70–80%
80–90%

=== Fifth District ===
Ramon Guico III defeated Amado Espino Jr. by just 3,512 votes, whose running for a 2nd term as congressman.

Candidate	Party	Votes	%
Ramon Guico III	Lakas-CMD	125,136	50.71
Amado Espino Jr. (incumbent)	PDP-Laban	121,624	49.29
Total		246,760	100.00
Lakas-CMD gain from PDP-Laban			

==== Results per city/municipality ====
City/municipality	Ramon Guico III		Amado Espino Jr.	
City/municipality	Votes	%	Votes	%
Alcala	10,790	48.33	11,534	51.67
Bautista	2,558	15.89	13,536	84.11
Binalonan	19,690	71.72	7,764	28.28
Laoac	8,636	52.70	7,752	47.30
Pozorrubio	19,874	55.38	16,010	44.62
Santo Tomas	3,246	49.36	3,330	50.64
Sison	10,899	46.93	12,326	53.07
Urdaneta City	35,275	53.29	30,925	46.71
Villasis	14,168	43.44	18,447	56.56
Total	125,136	50.71	121,624	49.29

Fifth District Results

Vote %

0–10%
10–20%
20–30%
40–50%
50–60%
70–80%
80–90%

=== Sixth District ===
Marilyn Primicias-Agabas is term limited. Her husband Tyrone Agabas runs for congressman to replace her.

Candidate	Party	Votes	%
Tyrone Agabas	NPC	202,978	93.73
Myrna Custodio	Independent	13,568	6.27
Total		216,546	100.00
NPC hold			

==== Results per city/municipality ====
City/municipality	Tyrone Agabas		Myrna Custodio	
City/municipality	Votes	%	Votes	%
Asingan	25,409	94.86	1,377	5.14
Balungao	13,757	93.88	897	6.12
Natividad	12,461	96.05	513	3.95
Rosales	29,427	94.57	1,691	5.43
San Manuel	19,653	95.70	883	4.30
San Nicolas	16,035	82.54	3,392	17.46
San Quintin	16,336	96.51	590	3.49
Santa Maria	15,562	96.33	593	3.67
Tayug	17,747	90.41	1,883	9.59
Umingan	36,591	95.30	1,803	4.70
Total	202,978	93.73	13,568	6.27

Sixth District Results

Vote %

0–10%
10–20%
80–90%
90–100%

== City elections ==
=== Alaminos ===
Candidate	Party	Votes	%
Bryan Celeste	Nacionalista Party	22,498	53.44
Earl James Aquino	PDP-Laban	19,452	46.20
Wenard Camba	Independent	152	0.36
Total		42,102	100.00

=== Dagupan ===
Candidate	Party	Votes	%
Bryan Lim	Nacionalista Party	49,156	50.64
Belen Fernandez	Lakas-CMD	47,917	49.36
Total		97,073	100.00

=== San Carlos ===
Candidate	Party	Votes	%
Ayoy Resuello	Nacionalista Party	45,711	55.01
Jonathan Lomboy	Nationalist People's Coalition	30,505	36.71
Beebong Soriano	Liberal Party	6,610	7.95
Romeo Cayabyab	Independent	270	0.32
Total		83,096	100.00

=== Urdaneta ===
Candidate	Party	Votes	%
Rammy Parayno	Lakas	38,695	56.28
Tet Perez-Naguiat	PDP-Laban	30,060	43.72
Total		68,755	100.00

== Municipal Elections ==
=== 1st District ===
- City: Alaminos City
- Municipalities: Agno, Anda, Bani, Bolinao, Burgos, Dasol, Infanta, Mabini, Sual

Agno

Candidate	Party	Votes	%
Gualberto Sison	PDP-Laban	8,271	57.71
Wilson Rosete	Nacionalista Party	6,062	42.29
Total		14,333	100.00

Anda

Candidate	Party	Votes	%
Jogz Rarang	Nacionalista Party	11,665	62.27
Lyn Ray Celino	PDP-Laban	7,069	37.73
Total		18,734	100.00

Bani

Candidate	Party	Votes	%
Gwen Yamamoto	Nacionalista Party	14,063	59.66
Filipina Rivera	PDP-Laban	9,508	40.34
Total		23,571	100.00

Bolinao

Candidate	Party	Votes	%
Alfonso Celeste	Nacionalista Party	25,801	83.40
Serafin Cacho Jr.	PDP-Laban	4,068	13.15
Paul Tucay	Independent	1,068	3.45
Total		30,937	100.00

Burgos

Candidate	Party	Votes	%
Ronald Ngayawan	Nacionalista Party	4,132	40.64
Allan Valenzuela	PDP-Laban	3,566	35.07
Domingo Doctor Jr.	Independent	2,469	24.28
Total		10,167	100.00

Dasol

Candidate	Party	Votes	%
Noel Nacar	PDP-Laban	9,485	52.68
Eric Verzosa	Nacionalista Party	8,519	47.32
Total		18,004	100.00

Infanta

Candidate	Party	Votes	%
Marvin Martinez	Nacionalista Party	8,361	64.55
Percival Mallare	PDP-Laban	4,592	35.45
Total		12,953	100.00

Mabini

Candidate	Party	Votes	%
Ariel De Guzman	PDP-Laban	8,361	64.55
Carlitos Reyes	Nacionalista Party	4,592	35.45
Total		12,953	100.00

Sual

Candidate	Party	Votes	%
Liseldo Calugay	PDP-Laban	12,101	53.70
John Rodney Arcinue	Nacionalista Party	10,434	46.30
Total		22,535	100.00

=== 2nd District ===
Municipalities: Aguilar, Basista, Binmaley, Bugallon, Labrador, Lingayen, Mangatarem, Urbiztondo

Aguilar

Candidate	Party	Votes	%
Boyet Sagles	Nationalist People's Coalition	6,718	31.01
Beth Ballesteros	PDP-Laban	6,501	30.01
Bert Zamuco	Independent	4,531	20.91
Ano Evangelista	National Unity Party	3,662	16.90
Eduardo Queroda	Independent	252	1.16
Total		21,664	100.00

Basista

Candidate	Party	Votes	%
Jr. Resuello	National Unity Party	9,398	51.67
Mannolito De Leon	PDP-Laban	8,391	46.13
Joy Perez	Nationalist People's Coalition	400	2.20
Total		18,189	100.00

Binmaley

Candidate	Party	Votes	%
Simplicio Rosario	United Nationalist Alliance	26,125	55.30
Pedro Merrera III	Independent	21,117	44.70
Total		47,242	100.00

Bugallon

Candidate	Party	Votes	%
Priscilla Espino	PDP-Laban	17,711	50.79
Rodrigo Orduña	Nacionalista Party	13,747	39.42
Vic Castro	Katipunan ng Demokratikong Pilipino	3,240	9.29
Rodolfo Javier	Independent	176	0.50
Total		34,874	100.00

Labrador

Candidate	Party	Votes	%
Domy Arenas	PDP-Laban	6,714	45.51
Ernesto Acain	Independent	5,281	35.80
Art Arenas	Nationalist People's Coalition	2,758	18.69
Total		14,753	100.00

Lingayen

Candidate	Party	Votes	%
Leopoldo Bataoil	National Unity Party	30,501	59.19
Iday Castañeda	Lakas-CMD	21,027	40.81
Total		51,528	100.00

Mangatarem

Candidate	Party	Votes	%
Balong Ventenilla	PDP-Laban	33,994	82.90
Teodoro Cruz	Independent	7,014	17.10
Total		41,008	100.00

Urbiztondo

Candidate	Party	Votes	%
Martin Raul Sison II	Nacionalista Party	15,482	54.86
Fidel Posadas	PDP-Laban	12,487	44.24
Mark Baniqued	Independent	254	0.90
Total		28,223	100.00

=== 3rd District ===
- City: San Carlos City
- Municipalities: Bayambang, Calasiao, Malasiqui, Mapandan, Santa Barbara

Bayambang

Candidate	Party	Votes	%
Cezar Quiambao	Nacionalista Party	38,001	63.81
Ricardo Camacho	PDP-Laban	21,557	36.19
Total		59,558	100.00

Calasiao

Candidate	Party	Votes	%
Joseph Arman Bauzon	PDP-Laban	28,355	56.24
Mark Roy Macanlalay	Nationalist People's Coalition	22,067	43.76
Total		50,422	100.00

Malasiqui

Candidate	Party	Votes	%
Noel Geslani	PDP-Laban	46,692	100.00
Total		46,692	100.00

Mapandan

Candidate	Party	Votes	%
Dooy Penuliar	National Unity Party	9,944	52.49
Gerald Glenn Tambaoan	PDP-Laban	9,002	47.51
Total		18,946	100.00

Santa Barbara

Candidate	Party	Votes	%
Joel Delos Santos	Nationalist People's Coalition	20,914	50.13
Carlito Zaplan Jr.	PDP-Laban	20,807	49.87
Total		41,721	100.00

=== 4th District ===
- City: Dagupan City
- Municipalities: Manaoag, Mangaldan, San Fabian, San Jacinto

Manaoag

Candidate	Party	Votes	%
Kim Amador	PDP-Laban	29,626	100.00
Total		29,626	100.00

Mangaldan

Candidate	Party	Votes	%
Marilyn Lambino	Lakas-CMD	26,938	51.99
Bona De Vera-Parayno	PDP-Laban	24,874	48.01
Total		51,812	100.00

San Fabian

Candidate	Party	Votes	%
Constante Agbayani	PDP-Laban	29,872	75.44
Jaming Libunao	Nationalist People's Coalition	9,727	24.56
Total		39,599	100.00

San Jacinto

Candidate	Party	Votes	%
Leo De Vera	PDP-Laban	12,207	58.28
Hilario De Guzman Jr.	Nationalist People's Coalition	8,738	41.72
Total		20,945	100.00

=== 5th District ===
- City: Urdaneta City
- Municipalities: Alcala, Bautista, Binalonan, Laoac, Pozorrubio, Santo Tomas, Sison, Villasis

Alcala

Candidate	Party	Votes	%
Jojo Callejo	PDP-Laban	14,670	64.91
Rene Mencias	Lakas-CMD	7,929	35.09
Total		22,599	100.00

Bautista

Candidate	Party	Votes	%
Amadeo Espino	PDP-Laban	11,807	74.78
Eduardo Ong	Nationalist People's Coalition	3,847	24.37
Rolando Jimenez	Workers' and Peasants' Party	135	0.86
Total		15,789	100.00

Binalonan

Candidate	Party	Votes	%
Ramon Guico Jr.	Lakas-CMD	15,883	59.25
Ryan Gotoc	PDP-Laban	10,924	40.75
Total		26,807	100.00

Laoac

Candidate	Party	Votes	%
Ricardo Balderas	PDP-Laban	11,770	71.23
Ramos Rolando	Lakas-CMD	4,634	28.04
Joselito Monico	Independent	120	0.73
Total		16,524	100.00

Pozorrubio

Candidate	Party	Votes	%
Emma Zosima Chan	Lakas-CMD	21,538	58.30
Ernesto Go	PDP-Laban	13,567	36.73
Joseph Frianeza	Independent	1,837	4.97
Total		36,942	100.00

Santo Tomas

Candidate	Party	Votes	%
Dick Villar	PDP-Laban	3,219	54.24
Ely Ramos	Lakas-CMD	2,716	45.76
Total		5,935	100.00

Sison

Candidate	Party	Votes	%
Danilo Uy	Nacionalista Party	14,585	59.65
Ericson Biason	Lakas-CMD	8,246	33.72
Filemon Gutierrez	PDP-Laban	1,620	6.63
Total		24,451	100.00

Villasis

Candidate	Party	Votes	%
Nato Abrenica	PDP-Laban	23,067	69.43
Butch Sison	Nationalist People's Coalition	9,830	29.59
Isagani Rabe	Independent	324	0.98
Total		33,221	100.00

=== 6th District ===
- Municipalities: Asingan, Balungao, Natividad, Rosales, San Manuel, San Nicolas, San Quintin, Santa Maria, Tayug, Umingan

Asingan

Candidate	Party	Votes	%
Carlos Lopez Jr.	Nationalist People's Coalition	15,820	52.57
Joshua Viray	PDP-Laban	9,053	30.08
Emmanuel Sapigao	Independent	5,222	17.35
Total		30,095	100.00

Balungao

Candidate	Party	Votes	%
Riza Peralta	PDP-Laban	10,482	66.47
Nestor Bergonia	Independent	5,288	33.53
Total		15,770	100.00

Natividad

Candidate	Party	Votes	%
Ruby Rafael	Nationalist People's Coalition	7,412	54.28
April Supnet	PDP-Laban	6,243	45.72
Total		13,655	100.00

Rosales

Candidate	Party	Votes	%
Susan Casareno	Nationalist People's Coalition	22,976	66.75
Ricardo Revita	PDP-Laban	11,445	33.25
Total		34,421	100.00

San Manuel

Candidate	Party	Votes	%
Kenneth Marco Perez	Nationalist People's Coalition	19,834	100.00
Total		19,834	100.00

San Nicolas

Candidate	Party	Votes	%
Alicia Primicias	PDP-Laban	12,996	62.67
Rebecca Saldivar	Nationalist People's Coalition	7,742	37.33
Total		20,738	100.00

San Quintin

Candidate	Party	Votes	%
Clark Cecil Tiu	Nacionalista Party	13,669	100.00
Total		13,669	100.00

Santa Maria

Candidate	Party	Votes	%
Julius Ramos	Nationalist People's Coalition	9,395	54.91
Kash Ginez	PDP-Laban	5,682	33.21
Condring Ignacio	Independent	1,957	11.44
Robin Carpo	Independent	76	0.44
Total		17,110	100.00

Tayug

Candidate	Party	Votes	%
Carlos Trece Mapili	Nationalist People's Coalition	18,003	100.00
Total		18,003	100.00

Umingan

Candidate	Party	Votes	%
Michael Carleone Cruz	Nacionalista Party	23,111	56.87
Emil Trinidad	Lakas-CMD	17,525	43.13
Total		40,636	100.00
