= One Pangasinan Alliance =

Economic alliance of six towns of Pangasinan, Philippines

- Country: Philippines
- Region: Region I
- Island: Luzon
- Province: Pangasinan
- Cities: Alaminos; Agno; Anda; Bani; Bolinao; Burgos; Dasol; Infanta; Mabini; Sual
- Legislative Districts: 1st District of Pangasinan

Government
  - Type: Economic Alliance

Area
  - Total: 1,759 km^{2} (679 sq mi)

Population (August 1, 2007)
  - Total: 379,637
- Time zone: UTC+8 (Philippine Standard Time)

One Pangasinan Alliance or OPAL (DMA) is an economic alliance of six towns and one city of western Pangasinan, representing the 1st District of Pangasinan. It is composed of Alaminos, Agno, Anda, Bani, Bolinao, Burgos, Dasol, Infanta, Mabini & Sual

According to the 2007 Philippine census, OPAL is home to 379,637 people and a land area of 1,759.

== Geography ==
=== Components ===
LGU	Income Class	District	Population (2007)	Area (km²)
Alaminos	4th class, component city	1st	79,788	164
Agno	3rd Class	1st	26,023	170
Anda	3rd Class	1st	34,398	75
Bani	2nd Class	1st	45,652	180
Burgos	4th Class	1st	20,187	131
Dasol	3rd Class	1st	27,027	167
Infanta	3rd Class	1st	23,731	254
Mabini	3rd Class	1st	23,338	291
Sual	1st Class	1st	29,925	130

=== Physical ===
OPAL is bounded by the 2nd District of Pangasinan to the South East, Lingayen Gulf to the North and North East, South China Sea facing West and Zambales on the South.

== Economy ==
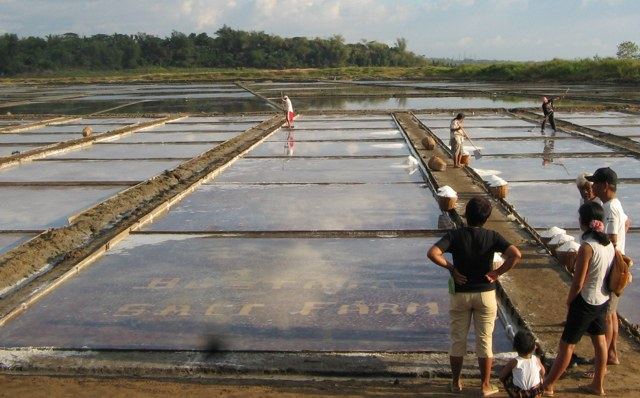
Commercial Salt Industry in Dasol

OPAL's economic drivers are Aquaculture, Tourism, Farming and Mineral extraction.

=== Energy ===
The 1200 megawatt Sual Coal-Fired Power Plant is located in the town of Sual.

=== Marine ===
Fish pens and fishponds dot the coastline of OPAL.

=== Agriculture ===
The major crops in are rice, mangoes, and corn.

=== Tourist attractions ===
- Cape Bolinao Beach in Bolinao
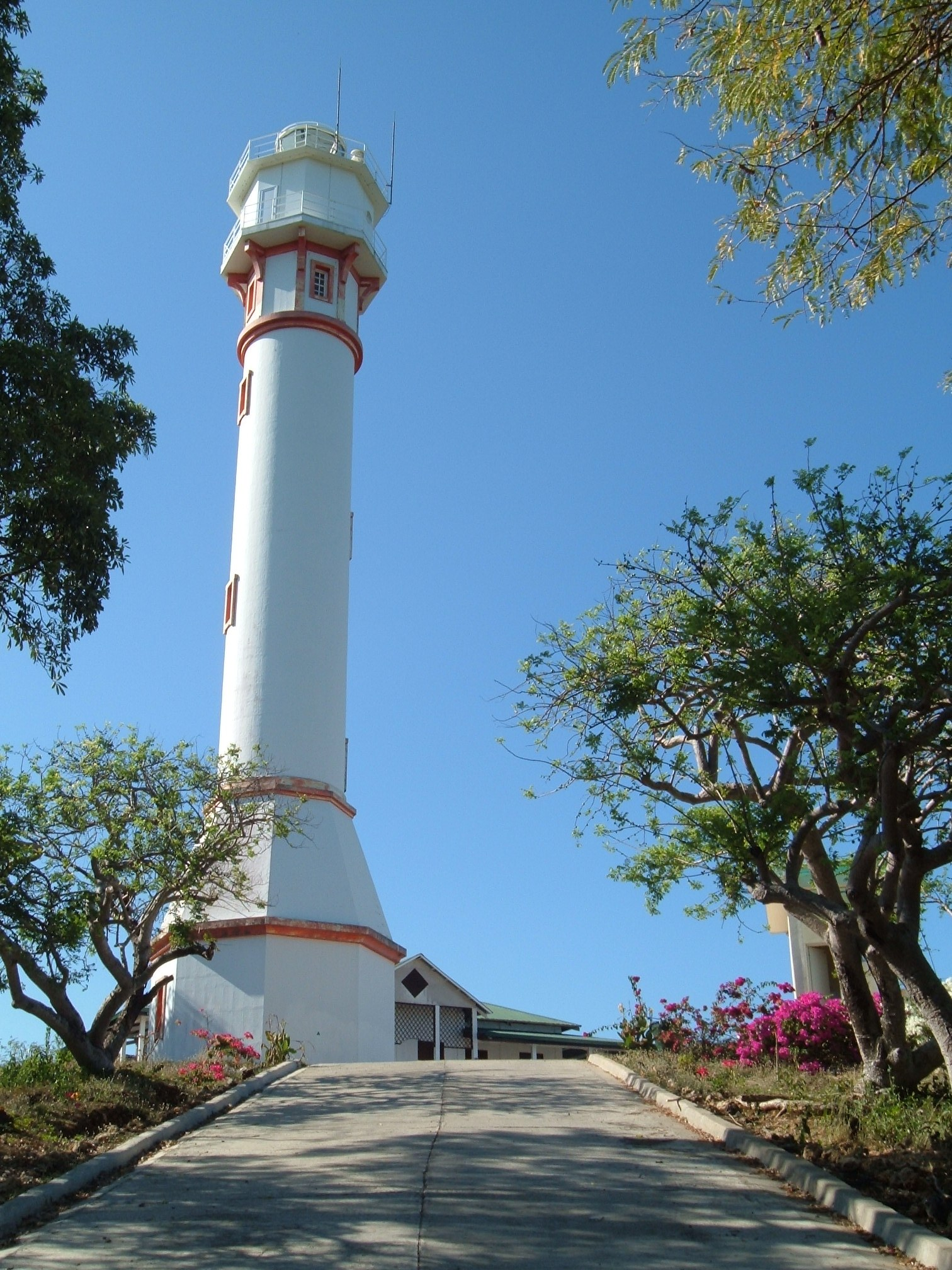
  Cape Bolinao Lighthouse
- Tambobong White Beach in Dasol
- Caves of Dasol
- Tondol Beach in Anda
- Cacupangan Cave System (Bintanilya, Binmatya, Villacorta Caves) in Brgys Tagudin & Villacorta, Mabini
- Sto. Rosario Cave System (Tubo-Tubo, Bual, Cabalyoriza Caves) in Brgys San Pedro & Barlo, Mabini
- Caves in Brgy. De Guzman, Mabini
- Balincaguin River in Mabini
- Sawang Falls in Brgy. Villcorta, Mabini
- Nalsoc Cave System (Mel-let, Abot Aso Caves) in Brgy. Colayo, Bani
- Bolinao Museum in Bolinao
- Hundred Islands Marine Sanctuary in Alaminos
- Oceanographic Marine Laboratory in Alaminos
- Hundred Islands National Park of Alaminos
- Umbrella Rocks of Agno
- Viewdeck in Suasalito, Sual, Pangasinan
- Dumaloy Cave & Sinkhole in Bolinao

== See also ==
- Urdaneta
- San Carlos
- Dagupan
