= Burgos, Pangasinan =

Municipality in Pangasinan, Philippines

Burgos San Isidro de Potot
- Municipality
- Municipality of Burgos
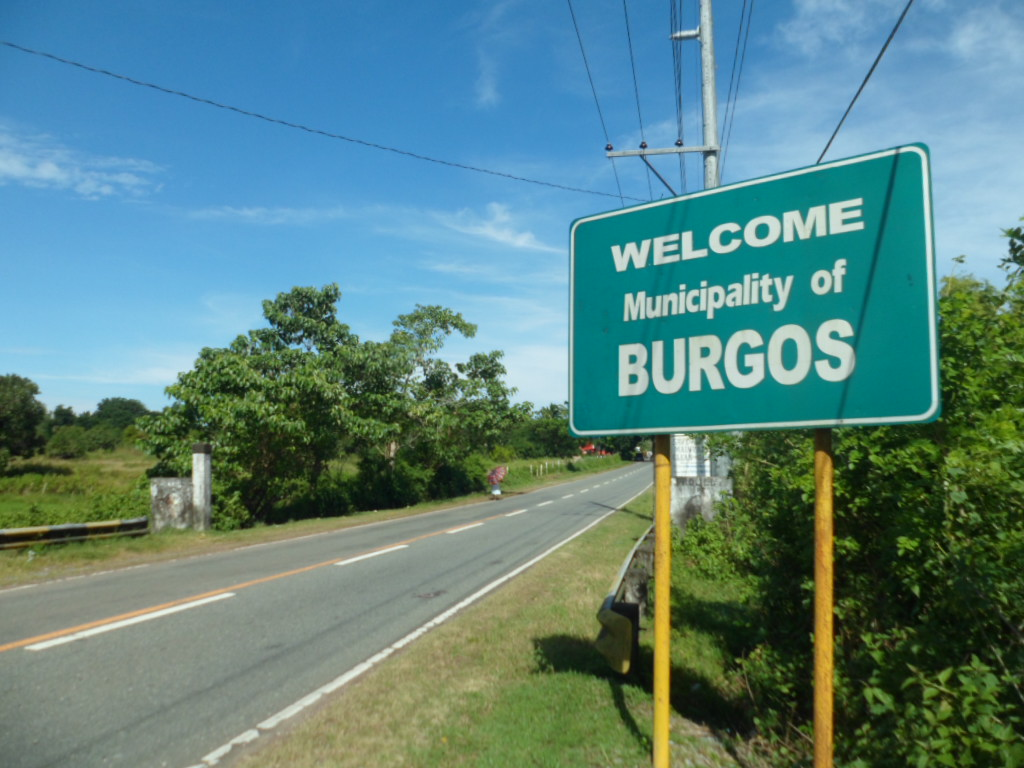
- Welcome signage

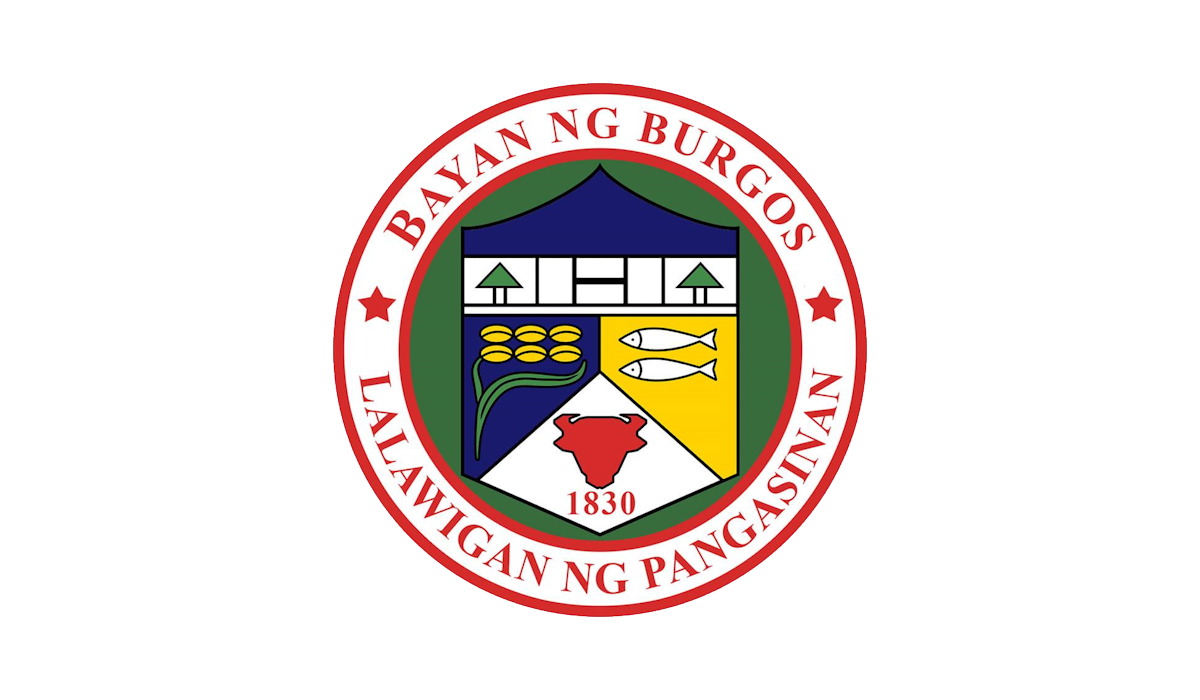
- Flag Seal

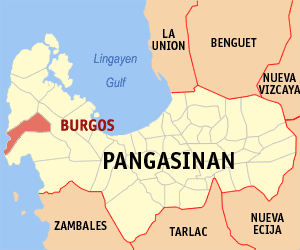
- Map of Pangasinan with Burgos highlighted
- Interactive map of Burgos
- Location within the Philippines
- Coordinates: 16°02′47″N 119°51′24″E
- Country: Philippines
- Region: Ilocos Region
- Province: Pangasinan
- District: 1st district
- Chartered: May 15, 1830
- Renamed: February 28, 1914
- Named for: José Burgos
- Barangays: 14 (see Barangays)

Government
  - Type: Sangguniang Bayan
  - Mayor: Jesster Allan B. Valenzuela (API)
  - Vice Mayor: Alberto R. Guiang Jr. (NP)
  - Representative: Arthur F. Celeste (NP)
  - Municipal Council: Members: Ronie P. Balisalisa (API); King Jordan B. Valenzuela (API); Norman G. Rosete (NP); Alvin G. Tolentino (NP); Osward A. Gines (API); Jovito D. Bonsato (NP); Fred Christian E. Nacar (API); Jordan B. Bonode (NP)
  - Electorate: 15,319 voters (2025)

Area
  - Total: 131.32 km^{2} (50.70 sq mi)
- Elevation: 55 m (180 ft)
- Highest elevation: 152 m (499 ft)
- Lowest elevation: 0 m (0 ft)

Population (2024 census)
  - Total: 23,240
  - Density: 177.0/km^{2} (458.4/sq mi)
  - Households: 5,601

Economy
  - Income class: 3rd municipal income class
  - Poverty incidence: 14.52% (2023)
  - Revenue: ₱ 161.1 million (2024)
  - Assets: ₱ 359.5 million (2024)
  - Expenditure: ₱ 148.7 million (2024)
  - Liabilities: ₱ 60.64 million (2024)

Service provider
  - Electricity: Pangasinan 1 Electric Cooperative (PANELCO 1)
- Time zone: UTC+8 (PST)
- ZIP code: 2410
- PSGC: 0105516000
- IDD : area code: +63 (0)75
- Native languages: Pangasinan; Ilocano; Sambal; Tagalog

Burgos, officially the Municipality of Burgos (Pangasinan: Baley na Burgos; Ilocano: Ili ti Burgos; Sambal: Babali nin Burgos; Tagalog: Bayan ng Burgos), is a municipality in the province of Pangasinan, Philippines. According to the 2024 census, it has a population of 23,240 people.

Burgos is located in the western part of Pangasinan, along the coast of the South China Sea. It was founded as an independent town in 1830 by the early Ilocanos from Paoay, Ilocos Norte headed by Don Matias Guiang. As the settlement became more populated and extensive, Don Guiang initiated a petition to the Governor of Zambales to create a new town out of the settlement. The request was granted and the new town was first named San Isidro before being renamed Burgos, after the Filipino martyr priest who was executed in 1872.

== Etymology ==
Burgos was originally named San Isidro in honor of its patron saint, Isidore the Laborer. Since there was another locality named San Isidro along the shores of the Lingayen Gulf, the residents added "Potot " to the town's name. This term is an Ilocano adjective meaning "clipped", "cut-off" or "disconnected", referring to the Agno River which during dry season does not have continuously flowing water. This stream, therefore, is discontinued and disconnected during summer months. Confusion however continued and persisted as mail for San Isidro de Potot was erroneously sent to the town of San Isidro Labrador and those of the latter to the former town.

On February 28, 1914, by virtue of Act No. 2390, the names of the municipalities of San Isidro Labrador and San Isidro de Potot in the Province of Pangasinan were changed to Labrador and Burgos, respectively.

== History ==
=== Spanish colonial era ===
In the first part of the 19th century, Matías Guiang, a mighty sailor-explorer from the town of Paoay, Ilocos Norte, regularly traveled the China Sea between the Ilocos and Zambales regions for the purpose of trade. Attracted to its agricultural possibilities, Matías Guiang along with his family, friends and neighbors eventually migrated to Zambales del Norte, now the westernmost part of the province of Pangasinan. They disembarked at the mouth of the Agno River by tracing it.

They found a settlement in the eastern part of the present town proper. The provincial government of Zambales has not ignored the ever increasing population of San Isidro and as it saw the necessity of a government to oversee the village. Don Matías Guiang made history, as quoted from the Philippine Archives, when on May 15, 1830, the Spanish Governor of Iba, Zambales issued a decree creating the settlement into a pueblo and appointed Don Matías Guiang, who was then the most wealthy and influential land owner of the place, as the first gobernadorcillo of the town. San Isidro de Potot was its incorporated name in honor of Saint Isidore the Laborer, whom the settlers had adopted, loved and revered as their patron saint.

Like in San Isidro de Potot, the origin of the largest number of Ilocano settlers who went & stayed in the rest of Zambales is Paoay, including those who stayed in the towns transferred to the administration of Pangasinan.

==== Philippine Revolution ====
In the late 19th century, the gobernadorcillo was Don Tomás Braga, and the parish priest of the town during the revolution was Mariano Torrente, a native of Barcelona, Spain. The town was a prosperous community of farming and ranching, but the atmosphere was already seething with dissidence; winds of rebellion disturbed the people.

Twenty Spanish cazadores had their cuartel or barracks in the big house of Don Gaspar Ruiz. Cazadores literally means "hunters" their aim was to hunt the Filipino outlaws or dissidents. Across the plaza from the cuartel was a big convent, made out of adobe stones, 24 meters long and 12 meters wide, and two stories high. Across the plaza from the convent was the tribunal or municipal hall, this tribunal was made out of stones, ten meters high. A tower was being constructed at the town plaza between the convent and the tribunal. This tower or fort was made of stones, 5 meters square inside dimensions, 3 stories high, and its walls are 1/2 meter thick.

As insurgency was becoming widespread; the Spaniards adopted measures that increased the number of outlaws. In Northern Zambales (now Western Pangasinan), the leader of the insurgency was Roman Manalang whose headquarters was in a hideout somewhere in Alaminos, while in San Isidro, the captain of the outlaws was Juanso Viado. The outlaws or dissidents, while numerous, had very few defective guns, and mostly armed with crude sabers, sharp spears and long bolos.

In February 1898, the outlaws attacked the cuartel of the Spanish forces in the big house of Don Gaspar Ruiz. The attackers greatly outnumbered the Spaniards, who managed to escape to the big convent across the plaza. The Filipino attackers laid a siege to them, but the Spaniards were able to escape again, now they entrenched themselves deeply to the tower at the middle of the plaza. The people of the town including the gobernadorcillo and the principales gone to distant the place.

After a siege of two nights and three days, the Spanish forces threw their guns out of the windows of the tower as surrender, mediated by Fr. Mariano Torrente.

The morning following the surrender, news reached San Isidro that a big Spanish troop, heavily armed had arrived in Alaminos and were on their way to San Isidro, to save the Spaniards. To prevent the escape, they were taken to the forest of Alimpayukan between San Isidro and Balincaguin (now Mabini), where in the forest, Alimpayukan, the Spanish cazadores and civiles and including Fr. Torrente and also Fr. Navas of Dasol were blindfolded and their heads cut-off.

Shortly after the Spaniards were murdered, the big Spanish troop arrived in San Isidro and encircled the town. There were 20 uniformed Filipino outlaws or insurgents who were to form a local government. These were caught, taken to Mt. Polipol just a few kilometers east from the town, and were shot in a single file. The Spanish troop burned down the big houses that were owned by the richest and the most influential people of the town.

Because the Spanish priest of Dasol, Fr. Juan Navas, was beheaded in the forest of Alimpayukan and many of the insurgents were from Dasol, the big Spanish troop proceeded to Dasol, where they killed the principales and captains, that is, the rich and the influential, and also burned their big houses.

On March 7, 1898, the small Spanish detachments in the northern towns of Zambales were defeated and around fifty Spanish friars were killed. These were the parish priests of Anda, Balincaguin, Bani, Bolinao, Dasol and San Isidro de Potot.

When the Spanish troops had left, the insurgents returned and established a local Katipunan Government.

=== American occupation ===
The Revolutionary Government functioned smoothly in San Isidro. In November 1900, Gen. Miguel and Don Miguel and Don Mauro Ortiz came to recruit volunteers to fight the Americans in Mangatarem. The volunteers went to Mangatarem, but poorly armed, had to retreat before the heavily armed Americans. They went back across the mountains to Mt. Pita, then went to Infanta, and then back to San Isidro.

The Americans occupied San Isidro by December 1900 and established peace and order through a policy of attraction. They gave clothes, free goods and tolerated the local customs. American styles of dress influenced the changing of Filipino costumes from oriental to occidental. In 1901, a severe storm hit San Isidro, destroying the big convent and the municipal building.

On October 15, 1903, by virtue of Act No. 945, entitled “An Act Reducing the Twenty-five Municipalities of the Province of Zambales to Fifteen,” while still part of the Province of Zambales, the municipality of San Isidro(Burgos) was consolidated with the municipalities of Balincaguin (Mabini) and Dasol, with the seat of the municipal government at San Isidro (Burgos). On November 30, 1903, the municipalities Alaminos, Bolinao, Infanta and San Isidro de Potot were ceded to Pangasinan. On December 19, 1903, by virtue of Act No. 1029, Act No. 1004 was amended to include the municipalities of Anda, Bani, and Agno among those annexed to the Province of Pangasinan. On October 26, 1904, the barrio of Eguia, then a part of the municipality of San Isidro (Burgos), was annexed to and consolidated with the municipality of Infanta.

On February 10, 1908, by virtue of Executive Order No. 12, issued by Governor-General James F. Smith, Balincaguin (Mabini) was separated from San Isidro de Potot (Burgos), effective January 1, 1909. On December 15, 1910 by virtue of Executive Order No. 84, issued by Governor-General William Cameron Forbes, Dasol was separated from San Isidro de Potot (Burgos), effective January 1, 1911.

San Isidro de Potot was renamed to Burgos (in honor of José Burgos) in 1914 and Balincaguin was renamed as Mabini (in honor of Apolinario Mabini) in 1930.

=== Japanese occupation ===
During the Japanese Occupation from 1941 to 1945, the Japanese soldiers did not much disturb the barrios of the town due to the Japanese high command ordering compulsory contribution of rice and bamboos for their garrison.

== Geography ==
The Municipality of Burgos is in the western part of Pangasinan situated on a broad plateau at the edge of the Zambales mountain ranges. It is west of Mabini, south of Agno, north of Dasol, and east of the South China Sea, on the Olongapo–Bugallon Road. It also holds the westernmost point in Luzon.

Burgos is situated 60.41 kilometres (37.54 mi) from the provincial capital Lingayen, and 269.34 kilometres (167.36 mi) from the country's capital city of Manila.

=== Barangays ===
Burgos is politically subdivided into 14 barangays. Each barangay consists of puroks and some have sitios.

- Anapao (Bur Anapac)
- Cacayasen
- Concordia
- Ilio-ilio (Iliw-iliw)
- Papallasen
- Poblacion
- Pogoruac
- Don Matias
- San Miguel
- San Pascual
- San Vicente
- Sapa Grande
- Sapa Pequeña
- Tambacan

=== Climate ===
Climate data for Burgos, Pangasinan
Month	Jan	Feb	Mar	Apr	May	Jun	Jul	Aug	Sep	Oct	Nov	Dec	Year
Mean daily maximum °C (°F)	31 (88)	31 (88)	32 (90)	34 (93)	35 (95)	34 (93)	32 (90)	32 (90)	32 (90)	32 (90)	32 (90)	31 (88)	32 (90)
Mean daily minimum °C (°F)	22 (72)	22 (72)	22 (72)	24 (75)	24 (75)	24 (75)	24 (75)	24 (75)	24 (75)	23 (73)	23 (73)	22 (72)	23 (74)
Average precipitation mm (inches)	13.6 (0.54)	10.4 (0.41)	18.2 (0.72)	15.7 (0.62)	178.4 (7.02)	227.9 (8.97)	368 (14.5)	306.6 (12.07)	310.6 (12.23)	215.7 (8.49)	70.3 (2.77)	31.1 (1.22)	1,766.5 (69.56)
Average rainy days	3	2	2	4	14	16	23	21	21	15	10	6	137
Source: World Weather Online

== Demographics ==
Population census of Burgos
Year	Pop.	±% p.a.
1903	3,488	—
1918	5,143	+2.62%
1939	8,075	+2.17%
1948	7,891	−0.26%
1960	10,030	+2.02%
1970	10,586	+0.54%
1975	12,430	+3.27%
1980	12,817	+0.61%
1990	14,774	+1.43%
1995	17,003	+2.67%
2000	18,142	+1.40%
2007	20,187	+1.48%
2010	18,315	−3.48%
2015	21,637	+3.23%
2020	23,749	+1.98%
2024	23,240	−0.52%
Source: Philippine Statistics Authority

== Economy ==
Poverty incidence of Burgos (%)

Source: Philippine Statistics Authority

== Government ==
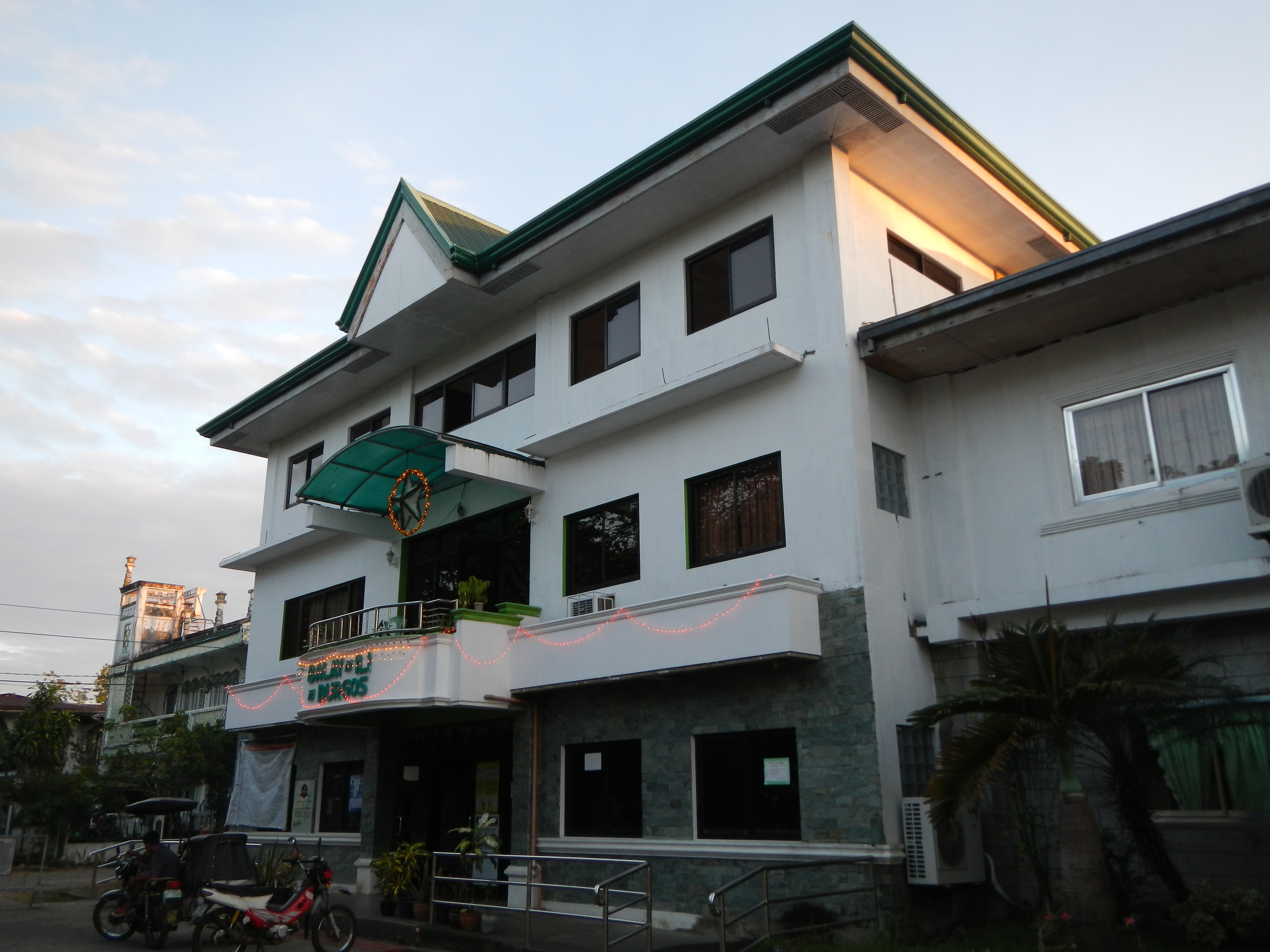
Burgos Town Hall

=== Local government ===
Burgos, belonging to the first congressional district of the province of Pangasinan, is governed by a mayor designated as its local chief executive and by a municipal council as its legislative body in accordance with the Local Government Code. The mayor, vice mayor, and the councilors are elected directly by the people through an election which is being held every three years.

=== Elected officials ===
Members of the Burgos Municipal Government (2025-2028)
Position	Name
Congressman	Arthur F. Celeste (NP)
Municipal Mayor	Jesster Allan B. Valenzuela (API)
Municipal Vice-Mayor	Albert R. Guiang Jr. (NP)
Municipal Councilors	Ronie P. Balisalisa (API)
Municipal Councilors	King Jordan B. Valenzuela (API)
Municipal Councilors	Norman G. Rosete (NP)
Municipal Councilors	Alvin G. Tolentino (NP)
Municipal Councilors	Osward A. Gines (API)
Municipal Councilors	Jovito D. Bonsato (NP)
Municipal Councilors	Fred Christian E. Nacar (API)
Municipal Councilors	Jordan B. Bonode (NP)

=== List of Municipal Heads ===
The name of persons who held a leading official position during the Spanish period and thereafter were the following.

Gobernadorcillo:

- Don Matias Guiang (1830)
- Don Pascual Bonostro (1831)
- Don Diego Bustamante (1832)
- Don Fernando Bonilla (1833)
- Don Paulo Padua (1834)
- Don Matias Guiang (1835)
- Don Juan Discoloso (1836)
- Don Juan Bonostro (1837)
- Don Agustin Cuaresma (1838)
- Don Pascual de Guzman (1839)
- Don Paulo Doctor (1840)
- Don Pedro Guiang (1841)
- Don Vicente Bondal (1842)
- Don Miguel Cuaresma (1843)
- Don Ramon Bustria (1844)
- Don Exequel Ugto (1845)
- Don Agapito Tolentino Braga (1846)
- Don Domingo Valdez (1847)
- Don Tomas Guiang (1848)
- Don Jose de Leon (1849)
- Don Juan Bonilla (1850)
- Don Henenio Doctor (1851)
- Don Raymundo Bonostro (1852)
- Don Romualdo Braga (1853)
- Don Melchor Ruiz (1854)
- Don Paulino Bustamante (1855)
- Don Feliciano de Guzman (1856)
- Don Eldefonzo Bona (1857)
- Don Cornelio Valdez (1858)
- Don Agapito Ugto (1859)
- Don Martin Gallardo (1860)
- Don Mariano Mendoza (1861)
- Don Anborcio Guiang (1862)
- Don Santiago Ruiz (1863–1865)
- Don Justo Bonado (1865–1867)
- Don Victorio Braga (1867–1869)
- Don Mauricio Gallardo (1869–1871)
- Don Silvestro Ruiz (1871–1873)
- Don Cornelio Braga (1873–1875)
- Don Flaviano Cudal (1875–1877)
- Don Francisco Guiang (1877–1879)
- Don Lorenzo Bonado (1879–1881)
- Don Raymundo Boricano (1881–1883)
- Don Simon Ruiz (1883–1885)
- Don Simon Guiang (1885–1887)
- Don Vinancio Gallardo (1887–1889)
- Don Pablo Boricano (1889–1891)
- Don Lauriano Kadarang (1891-1893)
- Don Luiz Bonilla (1893–1895)
- Don Tomas Braga (1895–1898)

=== Presidents during the Revolution ===
- Don Mauricio Gallardo (1898–1900)
- Don Vicente Mendoza
- Don Tomas Braga (1900–1901)
- Don Carlos Ruiz (1901–1902)

=== Civil Government (Municipal Presidents) ===
- Don Paulino Mendoza (1904–1905)
- Don Francisco Bustamante (1906–1907)
- Don Jacinto Braga (1908–1911)
- Don Nicolas Guiang (1911–1912)
- Don Anacleto Ruiz (1912–1916)
- Don Juan Bonado (1916–1919)
- Don Matias Ruiz (1919–1922)
- Don Agustin R. Braga (1922)
- Don Nazario Bonilla (1925–1928)
- Don Matias Bustamante (1928–1931)
- Don Melquiades Ruiz (1931–1934)
- Don Lorenzo Bonado (1934–1943)

=== Municipal Mayors ===
- Don Jacinto R. Braga (1907-1911)
- Don Nazario Bonilla (1925-1928)
- Hon. Melquiades D. Ruiz (1931-1934)
- Don Matias Bustamante (1928-1931)
- Don Lorenzo Bonado Y. Braga (1934)
- Don Severino Rayos (1948)
- Don Andres Ramos (1949–1951)
- Don Antonio Bonilla (1952-1956)
- Dr. Alberto G. Guiang Sr. (1956-1959)
- Hon. Pedro D. Ruiz (1960-1967)
- Hon. Emilio G. Ermitano M.D (1968-1971)
- Don Victorino B. Braga (1972-1980)
- Don Demetrio N. Cabiles (1980-1986) & (1988-1992)
- OIC Dr. Alberto R. Guiang Jr. (July 1, 1986 – November 30, 1986)
- Dr. Alberto G. Guiang, Sr. (1992-1995)
- Dr. Alberto G. Guiang, Jr. (1995-2001)
- Atty. Domingo A Doctor, Jr (2001-2010)
- Dr. Albert G. Guiang, Jr. (2010-2019)
- Dr. Ronald G. Ngayawan (2019–2022)
- Hon. Jesster Allan B. Valenzuela (2022–present)

== Tourism ==
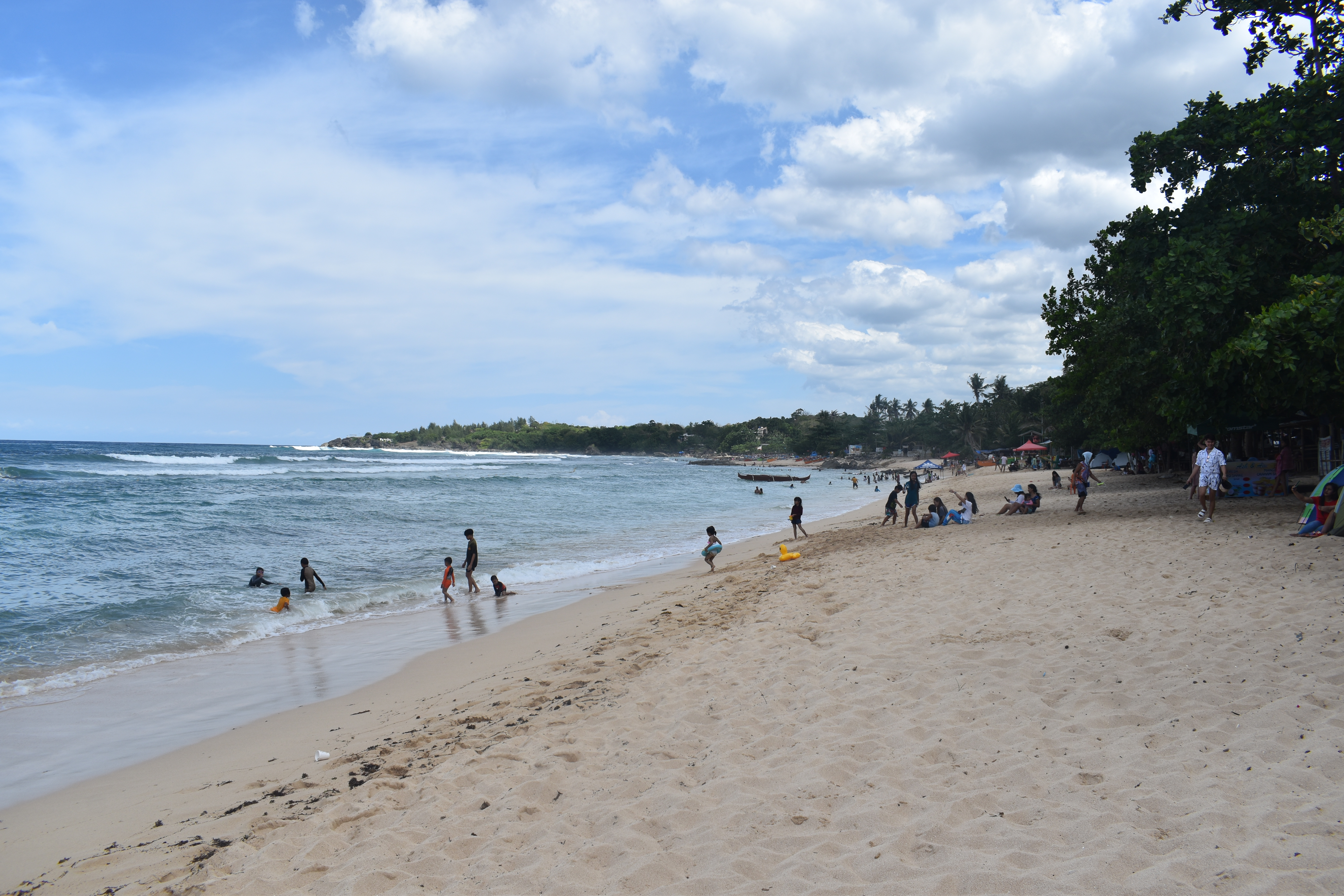
Cabongaoan White Sand Beach

The town of Burgos is home of some natural wonders like white-sand beaches and falls:

- Cabongaoan White Sand Beach: Cabongaoan Beach has a long stretch of sugary white sand that turns golden when the sun is out. Cabongaoan Beach has another feature that makes it a cut above the rest of Pangasinan's beaches, the so-called "Depth Pool." This tidal pool on the rocky side of the beach gets filled with water when the waves crash against it. It was featured in the national television show Kapuso Mo, Jessica Soho and Biyahe ni Drew.
- Sangbay Falls: Located in Barangay San Vicente. It can b challenging for some to get there because of the good 30-minute walk from the main road but the rewards at the other end are well worth the effort.
- Rolling Hills: Other natural attractions in Burgos include the rolling hills in southbound barangays of Sapa Pequeña, Sapa Grande, Concordia, Pogoruac, and Ilio-Ilio where herds of cattle in ranches roam freely.
- Danao Lake: Located in Barangay Cacayasen.
- Pao Beach/Nambalan Cove: Located in Barangay Ilio-ilio.
- Paratec Beach: Located in Barangay Ilio-ilio.
- Batog Beach: Located in Barangay Ilio-ilio.
- Nambalan Cove: Located in Barangay Ilio-Ilio
- Bayog Festival (May)

=== Saint Isidore the Farmer Parish Church ===
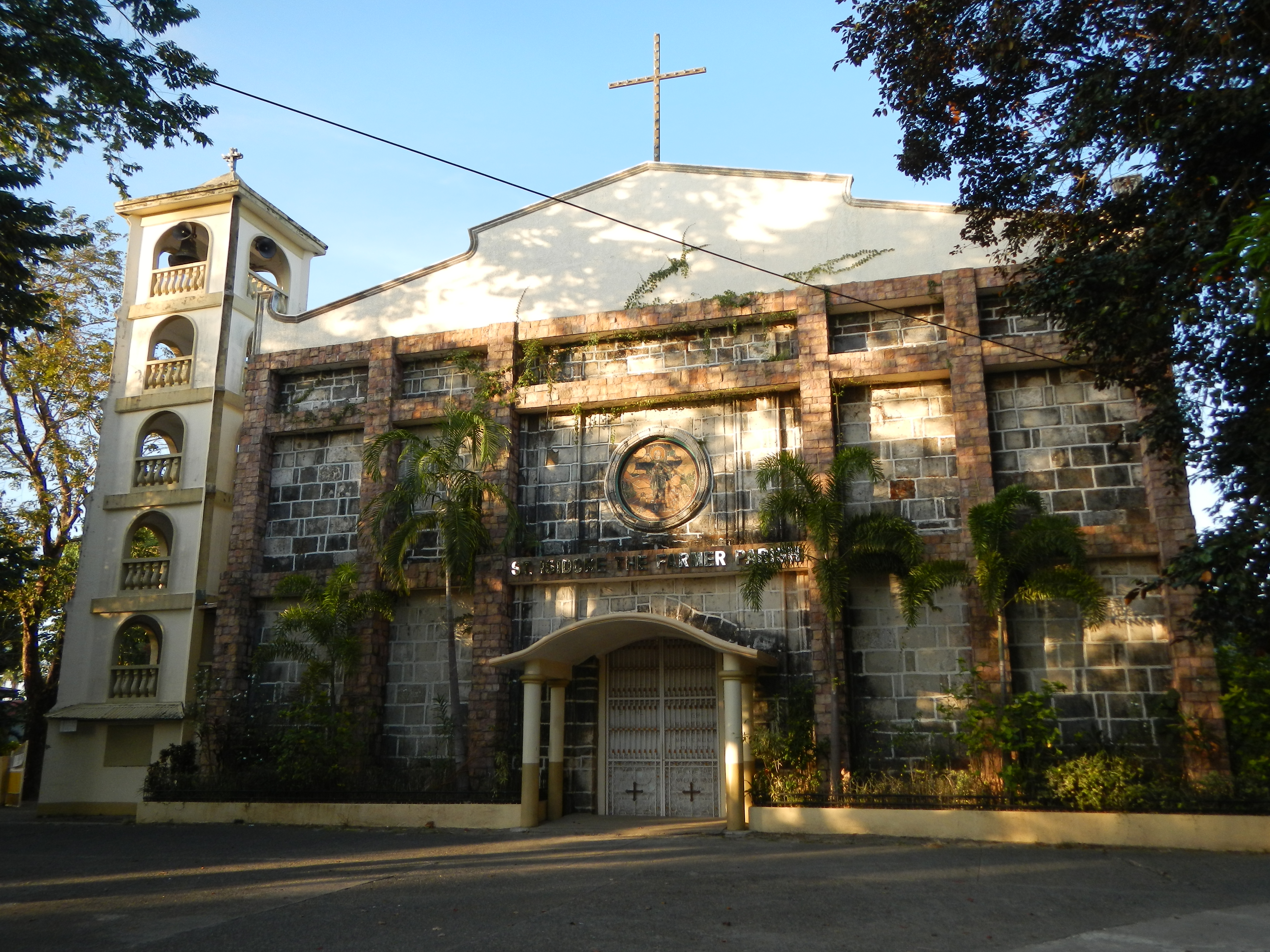
Saint Isidore the Farmer Parish Church

In 1876, the Dominicans created the Parish church of St. Isidore, the patron saint of farmers, seeing that the town's chief industry was farming. The patron's feast is annually celebrated on May 15.

It was the founding missionaries who built the present façade of the church, made mostly of quarried adobe stones contributed by the faithful. The Dominicans left during the American regime and were succeeded by Filipino clergymen who continued the improvement of the house of God and the ministration of the faithful. The church edifice, made mostly of quarried adobe stones and rough-hewn lumber, was built through many years.

== Education ==
The Burgos Schools District Office governs all educational institutions within the municipality. It oversees the management and operations of all private and public elementary and high schools.

=== Primary and elementary schools ===
- Anapao Elementary School
- Burgos Central School
- Cabaruan Elementary School
- Cabongaoan Elementary School
- Concordia Elementary School
- Don Antonio Bonilla Elementary School
- Don Antonio Bonilla Memorial Elementary School
- Don Matias Elementary School
- Ilio-Ilio Elementary School
- Papallasen Elementary School
- Poguruac Elementary School
- San Miguel Elementary School
- Sapa Pequeña Elementary School
- St. Adelaide School
- St. Isidore Learning Center
- Tambacan Elementary School
- The United Methodist Church Kiddie Learning Center

=== Secondary schools ===
- Burgos National High School
- Jose Rivera Bonsay National High School (Pogoruac National High School)
- Sapa Grande Integrated School

== See also ==
- List of renamed cities and municipalities of the Philippines
