= Legislative districts of Pangasinan =

Legislative district of the Philippines

The legislative districts of Pangasinan are the representations of the province of Pangasinan and the independent component city of Dagupan in the various national legislatures of the Philippines. The province and the city are currently represented in the lower house of the Congress of the Philippines through their first, second, third, fourth, fifth, and sixth congressional districts.

Map of the Current Legislative districts of Pangasinan

Map of the Reapportioned map of Pangasinan for House Bill No. 4140.

Proposed reapportioned map of Pangasinan for House Bill No. 5311.

== History ==
Pangasinan was initially composed of one representative district, wherein it had four representatives, at large, to the Malolos Congress from 1898 to 1899. Two representatives were elected, while the other two were appointed. It was later divided into five legislative districts from 1907 to 1972.

In the disruption caused by the Second World War, two delegates represented the province in the National Assembly of the Japanese-sponsored Second Philippine Republic: one was the provincial governor (an ex officio member), while the other was elected through a provincial assembly of KALIBAPI members during the Japanese occupation of the Philippines. Upon the restoration of the Philippine Commonwealth in 1945, the province retained its five pre-war representative districts.

It was part of the representation of Region I from 1978 to 1984, and from 1984 to 1986 it elected six assemblymen at-large.

Pangasinan was reapportioned into six congressional districts under the new Constitution which was proclaimed on February 11, 1987, and elected members to the restored House of Representatives starting that same year.

=== Reapportionment Attempts ===
2009 Reapportionment Attempt

In May 2009, Representative Victor Agbayani of Pangasinan filed House Bill No. 4140 (14th Congress)|House Bill No. 4140 during the 14th Congress. The bill sought to reapportion the province into seven legislative districts, citing population growth and the need for improved representation. After passing the House of Representatives, the bill was transmitted to the Senate. However, in June 2009, the Senate Committee on Local Government suspended hearings on the measure due to concerns over population data accuracy and potential political implications. As a result, the bill did not progress further and was not enacted into law.

2022 Reapportionment Attempt

In November 2022, Representative Robert Raymund M. Estrella of Pangasinan filed House Bill No. 6169 during the 19th Congress. The bill proposed to reapportion the province into eight legislative districts, aiming to address population disparities and enhance local governance.

== Current Districts ==
Legislative districts and representatives of Pangasinan
District	Current Representative		Party	Constituent LGUs	Population (2024)	Area	Map
District	Image	Name	Party	Constituent LGUs	Population (2024)	Area	Map
1st		Arthur Celeste (since 2022); Alaminos	Nacionalista	List: Agno; Alaminos; Anda; Bani; Bolinao; Burgos; Dasol; Infanta; Mabini; Sual	456,894	1,758.81 km^{2}	
2nd		Mark Cojuangco (since 2022); Labrador	NPC	List: Aguilar; Basista; Binmaley; Bugallon; Labrador; Lingayen; Mangatarem; Urbiztondo	518,738	1,080.86 km^{2}	
3rd		Maria Rachel Arenas (since 2022); San Carlos	Lakas–CMD	List: Bayambang; Calasiao; Malasiqui; Mapandan; San Carlos; Santa Barbara	713,514	584.07 km^{2}	
4th		Gina de Venecia (since 2025); Dagupan	Lakas–CMD	List: Dagupan; Manaoag; Mangaldan; San Fabian; San Jacinto	497,112	274.35 km^{2}	
5th		Ramon Guico Jr. (since 2022); Binalonan	Lakas–CMD	List: Alcala; Bautista; Binalonan; Laoac; Pozorrubio; Santo Tomas; Sison; Urdaneta; Villasis	528,814	585.67 km^{2}	
6th		Marlyn Primicias-Agabas (since 2022); Tayug	Lakas–CMD	List: Asingan; Balungao; Natividad; Rosales; San Manuel; San Nicolas; San Quintin; Santa Maria; Tayug; Umingan	473,468	1,175.09 km^{2}	

== At-Large (defunct) ==
=== 1898–1899 ===
Period	Representatives
Malolos Congress; 1898–1899	Vicente del Prado
Malolos Congress; 1898–1899	Antonio Feliciano
Malolos Congress; 1898–1899	Sebastian de Castro
Malolos Congress; 1898–1899	Adriano Garces

=== 1943–1944 ===
Period	Representative
National Assembly; 1943–1944	Bernabe de Aquino
National Assembly; 1943–1944	Santiago U. Estrada (ex officio)

=== 1984–1986 ===
Period	Representative
Regular Batasang Pambansa; 1984–1986	Victor E. Agbayani
Regular Batasang Pambansa; 1984–1986	Gregorio Cendaña
Regular Batasang Pambansa; 1984–1986	Felipe P. De Vera
Regular Batasang Pambansa; 1984–1986	Demetrio G. Demetria
Regular Batasang Pambansa; 1984–1986	Conrado F. Estrella, Sr.
Regular Batasang Pambansa; 1984–1986	Fabian S. Sison
