= Pangasinan's 1st congressional district =

Legislative district of the Philippines

- Constituency for the House of Representatives of the Philippines
- Boundary of Pangasinan's 1st congressional district in Pangasinan
- Location of Pangasinan within the Philippines
- Province: Pangasinan
- Region: Ilocos Region
- Population: 454,365 (2020)
- Electorate: 294,221 (2022)
- Major settlements: 10 LGUs: Cities; Alaminos; Municipalities; Agno; Anda; Bani; Bolinao; Burgos; Dasol; Infanta; Mabini; Sual
- Area: 1,758.81 km^{2} (679.08 sq mi)

Current constituency
- Created: 1907
- Representative: Arthur F. Celeste
- Political party: Nacionalista
- Congressional bloc: Majority

Pangasinan's 1st congressional district is one of the six congressional districts of the Philippines in the province of Pangasinan. It has been represented in the House of Representatives of the Philippines since 1916 and earlier in the Philippine Assembly from 1907 to 1916. The district consists of the western Pangasinan city of Alaminos and adjacent municipalities of Agno, Anda, Bani, Bolinao, Burgos, Dasol, Infanta, Mabini and Sual. It is currently represented in the 20th Congress by Arthur F. Celeste of the Nacionalista Party (NP).

== Representation history ==
#	Image	Member	Term of office		Legislature	Party	Electoral history	Constituent LGUs
#	Image	Member	Start	End	Legislature	Party	Electoral history	Constituent LGUs
=== Pangasinan's 1st district for the Philippine Assembly ===
District created January 9, 1907.
1		Nicanor Padilla	October 16, 1907	October 16, 1909	1st	Independent	Elected in 1907.	1907–1909; Agno, Aguilar, Alaminos, Anda, Bani, Bolinao, Infanta, Lingayen, Salasa, San Isidro de Potot, Sual
2		Cirilo Braganza	October 16, 1909	October 16, 1912	2nd	Nacionalista	Elected in 1909.	1909–1912; Agno, Aguilar, Alaminos, Anda, Balincaguin, Bani, Bolinao, Infanta, Labrador, Lingayen, Salasa, San Isidro de Potot, Sual
3		Vicente Solis	October 16, 1912	October 16, 1916	3rd	Independent	Elected in 1912.	1912–1916; Agno, Aguilar, Alaminos, Anda, Balincaguin, Bani, Bolinao, Dasol, Infanta, Labrador, Lingayen, Salasa, San Isidro de Potot, Sual
=== Pangasinan's 1st district for the House of Representatives of the Philippine Islands ===					3rd			
4		Modesto Sison	October 16, 1916	June 3, 1919	4th	Progresista	Elected in 1916.	1916–1922; Agno, Aguilar, Alaminos, Anda, Balincaguin, Bani, Bolinao, Burgos, Dasol, Infanta, Labrador, Lingayen, Salasa, Sual
5		Antonio Bengzon	June 3, 1919	June 6, 1922	5th	Nacionalista	Elected in 1919.	1916–1922; Agno, Aguilar, Alaminos, Anda, Balincaguin, Bani, Bolinao, Burgos, Dasol, Infanta, Labrador, Lingayen, Salasa, Sual
6		Mauro Navarro	June 6, 1922	June 2, 1925	6th	Nacionalista; Unipersonalista	Elected in 1922.	1922–1931; Agno, Aguilar, Alaminos, Anda, Balincaguin, Bani, Bolinao, Bugallon, Burgos, Dasol, Infanta, Labrador, Lingayen, Sual
7		Enrique Braganza	June 2, 1925	June 5, 1928	7th	Nacionalista; Consolidado	Elected in 1925.	1922–1931; Agno, Aguilar, Alaminos, Anda, Balincaguin, Bani, Bolinao, Bugallon, Burgos, Dasol, Infanta, Labrador, Lingayen, Sual
8		Potenciano Pecson	June 5, 1928	September 16, 1935	8th	Nacionalista; Consolidado	Elected in 1928.	1922–1931; Agno, Aguilar, Alaminos, Anda, Balincaguin, Bani, Bolinao, Bugallon, Burgos, Dasol, Infanta, Labrador, Lingayen, Sual
8		Potenciano Pecson	June 5, 1928	September 16, 1935	9th	Nacionalista; Consolidado	Re-elected in 1931.	1931–1935; Agno, Aguilar, Alaminos, Anda, Bani, Bolinao, Bugallon, Burgos, Dasol, Infanta, Labrador, Lingayen, Mabini, Sual
8		Potenciano Pecson	June 5, 1928	September 16, 1935	10th	Nacionalista; Democrático	Re-elected in 1934.	1931–1935; Agno, Aguilar, Alaminos, Anda, Bani, Bolinao, Bugallon, Burgos, Dasol, Infanta, Labrador, Lingayen, Mabini, Sual
#	Image	Member	Term of office		National Assembly	Party	Electoral history	Constituent LGUs
#	Image	Member	Start	End	National Assembly	Party	Electoral history	Constituent LGUs
=== Pangasinan's 1st district for the National Assembly (Commonwealth of the Philippines) ===
9		Anacleto B. Ramos	September 16, 1935	December 30, 1941	1st	Nacionalista; Democrático	Elected in 1935.	1935–1941; Agno, Aguilar, Alaminos, Anda, Bani, Bolinao, Bugallon, Burgos, Dasol, Infanta, Labrador, Lingayen, Mabini, Sual
9		Anacleto B. Ramos	September 16, 1935	December 30, 1941	2nd	Nacionalista	Re-elected in 1938.	1935–1941; Agno, Aguilar, Alaminos, Anda, Bani, Bolinao, Bugallon, Burgos, Dasol, Infanta, Labrador, Lingayen, Mabini, Sual
District dissolved into the two-seat Pangasinan's at-large district for the National Assembly (Second Philippine Republic).
#	Image	Member	Term of office		Common wealth Congress	Party	Electoral history	Constituent LGUs
#	Image	Member	Start	End	Common wealth Congress	Party	Electoral history	Constituent LGUs
=== Pangasinan's 1st district for the House of Representatives of the Commonwealth of the Philippines ===
District re-created May 24, 1945.
10		Jose P. Bengzon	June 11, 1945	May 25, 1946	1st	Nacionalista	Elected in 1941.	1945–1946; Agno, Aguilar, Alaminos, Anda, Bani, Bolinao, Bugallon, Burgos, Dasol, Infanta, Labrador, Lingayen, Mabini, Sual
#	Image	Member	Term of office		Congress	Party	Electoral history	Constituent LGUs
#	Image	Member	Start	End	Congress	Party	Electoral history	Constituent LGUs
=== Pangasinan's 1st district for the House of Representatives of the Philippines ===
11		Juan de Guzmán Rodríguez	May 25, 1946	December 30, 1949	1st	Nacionalista	Elected in 1946.	1946–1972; Agno, Aguilar, Alaminos, Anda, Bani, Bolinao, Bugallon, Burgos, Dasol, Infanta, Labrador, Lingayen, Mabini, Sual
12		Sulpicio R. Soriano	December 30, 1949	December 30, 1953	2nd	Liberal	Elected in 1949.	1946–1972; Agno, Aguilar, Alaminos, Anda, Bani, Bolinao, Bugallon, Burgos, Dasol, Infanta, Labrador, Lingayen, Mabini, Sual
13		Mario Bengzon	December 30, 1953	December 30, 1957	3rd	Nacionalista	Elected in 1953.	1946–1972; Agno, Aguilar, Alaminos, Anda, Bani, Bolinao, Bugallon, Burgos, Dasol, Infanta, Labrador, Lingayen, Mabini, Sual
14		Aguedo Agbayani	December 30, 1957	September 23, 1972	4th	Nacionalista	Elected in 1957.	1946–1972; Agno, Aguilar, Alaminos, Anda, Bani, Bolinao, Bugallon, Burgos, Dasol, Infanta, Labrador, Lingayen, Mabini, Sual
14		Aguedo Agbayani	December 30, 1957	September 23, 1972	5th	Nacionalista	Re-elected in 1961.	1946–1972; Agno, Aguilar, Alaminos, Anda, Bani, Bolinao, Bugallon, Burgos, Dasol, Infanta, Labrador, Lingayen, Mabini, Sual
14		Aguedo Agbayani	December 30, 1957	September 23, 1972	6th	Nacionalista	Re-elected in 1965.	1946–1972; Agno, Aguilar, Alaminos, Anda, Bani, Bolinao, Bugallon, Burgos, Dasol, Infanta, Labrador, Lingayen, Mabini, Sual
14		Aguedo Agbayani	December 30, 1957	September 23, 1972	7th	Nacionalista	Re-elected in 1969. Removed from office after imposition of martial law.	1946–1972; Agno, Aguilar, Alaminos, Anda, Bani, Bolinao, Bugallon, Burgos, Dasol, Infanta, Labrador, Lingayen, Mabini, Sual
District dissolved into the twelve-seat Region I's at-large district for the Interim Batasang Pambansa, followed by the six-seat Pangasinan's at-large district for the Regular Batasang Pambansa.
District re-created February 2, 1987.
15		Oscar Orbos	June 30, 1987	January 1, 1990	8th	Lakas ng Bansa	Elected in 1987. Resigned on appointment as Secretary of Transportation and Communications.	1987–present Agno, Alaminos, Anda, Bani, Bolinao, Burgos, Dasol, Infanta, Mabini, Sual
15		Oscar Orbos	June 30, 1987	January 1, 1990	8th	LDP	Elected in 1987. Resigned on appointment as Secretary of Transportation and Communications.	1987–present Agno, Alaminos, Anda, Bani, Bolinao, Burgos, Dasol, Infanta, Mabini, Sual
15		Oscar Orbos	June 30, 1992	June 30, 1995	9th	Independent	Re-elected in 1992.	1987–present Agno, Alaminos, Anda, Bani, Bolinao, Burgos, Dasol, Infanta, Mabini, Sual
16		Hernani Braganza	June 30, 1995	February 12, 2001	10th	Lakas	Elected in 1995.	1987–present Agno, Alaminos, Anda, Bani, Bolinao, Burgos, Dasol, Infanta, Mabini, Sual
16		Hernani Braganza	June 30, 1995	February 12, 2001	11th	Lakas	Re-elected in 1998. Resigned on appointment as Secretary of Agrarian Reform.	1987–present Agno, Alaminos, Anda, Bani, Bolinao, Burgos, Dasol, Infanta, Mabini, Sual
17		Arthur F. Celeste	June 30, 2001	June 30, 2010	12th	Independent	Elected in 2001.	1987–present Agno, Alaminos, Anda, Bani, Bolinao, Burgos, Dasol, Infanta, Mabini, Sual
17		Arthur F. Celeste	June 30, 2001	June 30, 2010	13th	KAMPI	Re-elected in 2004.	1987–present Agno, Alaminos, Anda, Bani, Bolinao, Burgos, Dasol, Infanta, Mabini, Sual
17		Arthur F. Celeste	June 30, 2001	June 30, 2010	14th	Lakas	Re-elected in 2007.	1987–present Agno, Alaminos, Anda, Bani, Bolinao, Burgos, Dasol, Infanta, Mabini, Sual
18		Jesus F. Celeste	June 30, 2010	June 30, 2019	15th	NPC	Elected in 2010.	1987–present Agno, Alaminos, Anda, Bani, Bolinao, Burgos, Dasol, Infanta, Mabini, Sual
18		Jesus F. Celeste	June 30, 2010	June 30, 2019	16th	NPC	Re-elected in 2013.	1987–present Agno, Alaminos, Anda, Bani, Bolinao, Burgos, Dasol, Infanta, Mabini, Sual
18		Jesus F. Celeste	June 30, 2010	June 30, 2019	17th	PDP–Laban	Re-elected in 2016.	1987–present Agno, Alaminos, Anda, Bani, Bolinao, Burgos, Dasol, Infanta, Mabini, Sual
19		Arnold F. Celeste	June 30, 2019	June 30, 2022	18th	Nacionalista	Elected in 2019.	1987–present Agno, Alaminos, Anda, Bani, Bolinao, Burgos, Dasol, Infanta, Mabini, Sual
(17)		Arthur F. Celeste	June 30, 2022	Incumbent	19th	Nacionalista	Elected in 2022.	1987–present Agno, Alaminos, Anda, Bani, Bolinao, Burgos, Dasol, Infanta, Mabini, Sual
(17)		Arthur F. Celeste	June 30, 2022	Incumbent	20th	Nacionalista	Re-elected in 2025.	1987–present Agno, Alaminos, Anda, Bani, Bolinao, Burgos, Dasol, Infanta, Mabini, Sual

== Election results ==
=== 2025 ===
Candidate	Party	Votes	%
Arthur Celeste (incumbent)	Nacionalista Party	187,173	100.00
Total		187,173	100.00
Valid votes		187,173	72.72
Invalid/blank votes		70,230	27.28
Total votes		257,403	100.00
Registered voters/turnout		303,690	84.76
Nacionalista Party hold			
Source: Commission on Elections

=== 2022 ===
2022 Philippine House of Representatives elections
Party	Candidate	Votes	%
Nacionalista	Arthur "Art" Celeste	155,372	
Aksyon	Oscar Orbos	82,983	
Total votes		203,680	
Nacionalista hold			

=== 2016 ===
2016 Philippine House of Representatives elections
Party	Candidate	Votes	%
NPC	Jesus Celeste	147,273	
Liberal	Wilmer Panabang	18,799	
KBL	Paul Tucay	3,140	
Margin of victory			
Invalid or blank votes		34,468	
Total votes		203,680	
NPC hold			

=== 2013 ===
2013 Philippine House of Representatives elections
Party	Candidate	Votes	%
NPC	Jesus Celeste	109,914	57.51
Liberal	Leonildo Pulido	54,949	28.76
Margin of victory		54,965	28.75%
Invalid or blank votes		26,242	14.15
Total votes		191,105	100.00
NPC hold			

=== 2010 ===
2010 Philippine House of Representatives elections
Party	Candidate	Votes	%
Lakas–Kampi	Jesus Celeste	82,577	48.36
PMP	Maki Pulido	56,899	33.32
Liberal	Danilo Dizon	21,875	12.81
Nacionalista	Domingo Doctor, Jr.	8,042	4.71
Aksyon	Christine Jimenez	929	0.54
Independent	Vladimir Mauricio Mabalot III	431	0.25
Valid ballots		170,753	92.49
Invalid or blank votes		13,869	7.51
Total votes		184,622	100.00
Lakas–Kampi hold			

=== 2007 ===
2007 Philippine House of Representatives elections
Party	Candidate	Votes	%
KAMPI	Arthur Celeste	102,247	
LDP	Alberto Braganza	35,677	
Valid ballots			
Invalid or blank votes			
Total votes			
KAMPI hold			

== See also ==
- Legislative districts of Pangasinan
