= Bani, Pangasinan =

Municipality in Pangasinan, Philippines

Bani
- Municipality
- Municipality of Bani
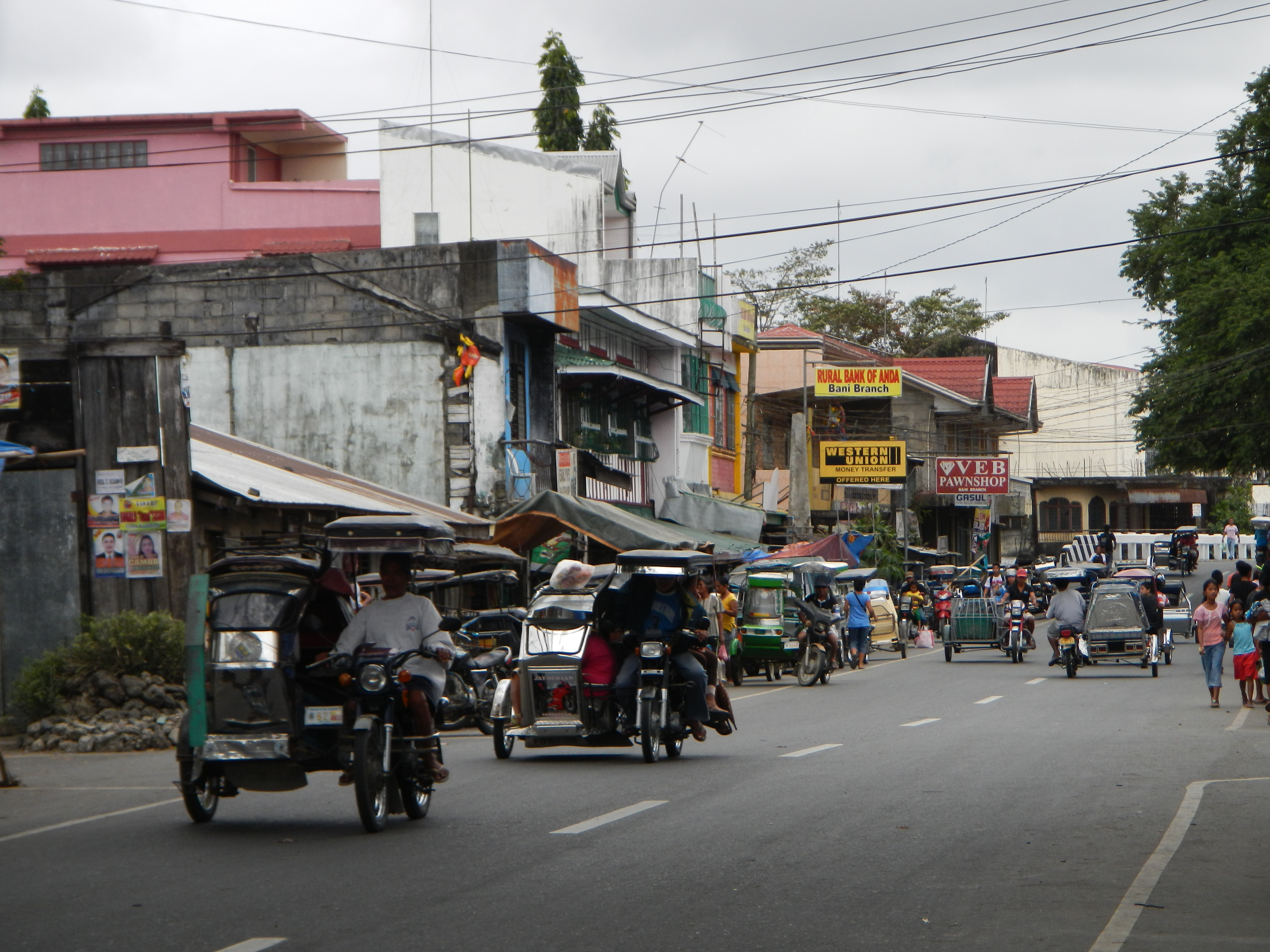
- Street in Bani

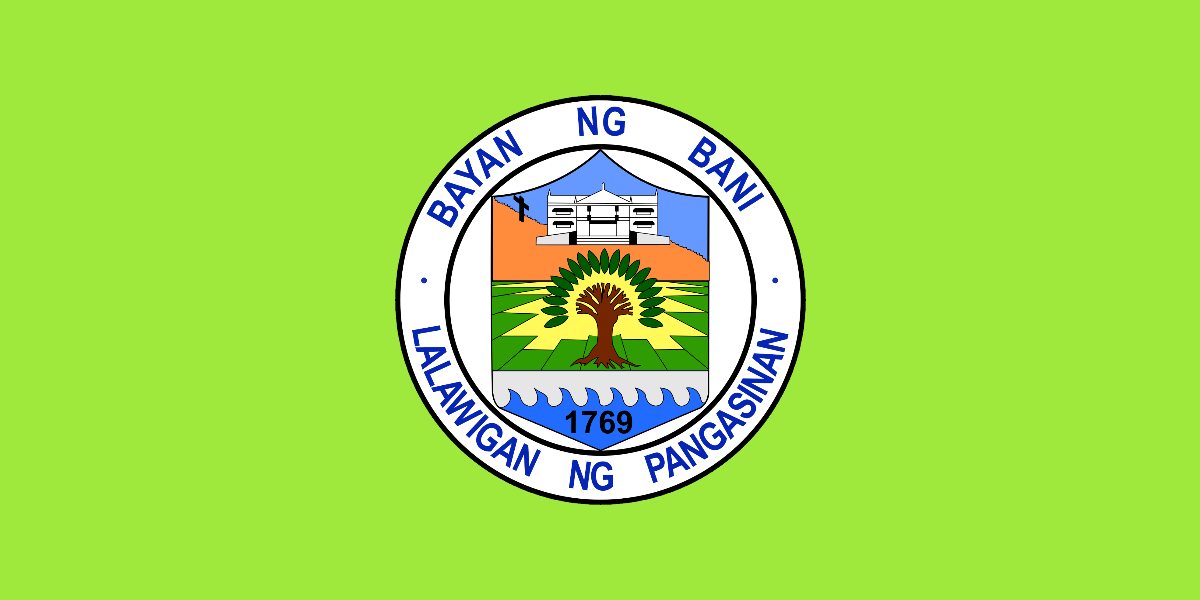
- Flag Seal

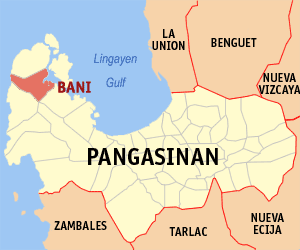
- Map of Pangasinan with Bani highlighted

- Location within the Philippines
- Coordinates: 16°11′13″N 119°51′33″E
- Country: Philippines
- Region: Ilocos Region
- Province: Pangasinan
- District: 1st district
- Founded: March 18, 1769
- Named for: Bani tree
- Barangays: 27 (see Barangays)

Government
  - Type: Sangguniang Bayan
  - Mayor: Facundo O. Palafox (NP)
  - Vice Mayor: Cothera Gwen P. Yamamoto (NP)
  - Representative: Arthur F. Celeste (NP)
  - Municipal Council: Members: Mark Gringo B. Ampler (NP); Ronaldo C. Catabay (NP); Frebien Jake M. Amosig (NP); Jovy Lynne C. Olores (NP); Filipina C. Rivera (API); Alvin C. Camba (NP); Emilio Q. Olores II (NP); Noel I. Talania (API)
  - Electorate: 32,440 voters (2025)

Area
  - Total: 179.65 km^{2} (69.36 sq mi)
- Elevation: 43 m (141 ft)

Population (2024 census)
  - Total: 52,715
  - Density: 293.43/km^{2} (759.98/sq mi)
  - Households: 13,738

Economy
  - Income class: 1st municipal income class
  - Poverty incidence: 13.42% (2023)
  - Revenue: ₱ 250.9 million (2024)
  - Assets: ₱ 843.3 million (2024)
  - Expenditure: ₱ 247.7 million (2024)
  - Liabilities: ₱ 149.1 million (2024)

Service provider
  - Electricity: Pangasinan 1 Electric Cooperative (PANELCO 1)
- Time zone: UTC+8 (PST)
- ZIP code: 2407
- PSGC: 0105508000
- IDD : area code: +63 (0)75
- Native languages: Pangasinan; Ilocano; Sambal; Tagalog
- Website: www.bani.gov.ph

Bani, officially the Municipality of Bani (Pangasinan: Baley na Bani; Ilocano: Ili ti Bani; Sambal: Babali nin Bani; Tagalog: Bayan ng Bani), is a municipality in the province of Pangasinan, Philippines. According to the 2024 census, it has a population of 52,715 people.

== Etymology ==
The town, dubbed as the "Golden West" in the 1960s and early 1970s, is named after the bani tree which could be found in its poblacion.

== History ==
=== Spanish colonial era ===
Spain ruled Bani from 1521 to 1899. The pueblo's Gobernadorcillos were appointed by the Spanish authorities and from 1901 to 1936, the Presidentes, by the Americans. From 1937 to present, the local chief executives were elected.

Bani was founded on March 18, 1769. It used to be a part of Zambales as a component of Bolinao.

In 1769, Father Mains de Lamberto erected a "visita" in Bani with settlements around Don Cayo banks. Eventually, these settlements became a sitio, with local officials being headed by Don Francisco Baltazar as "Tiniente Absolute". Bani was repopulated by the Ilocano settlers from Paoay, Ilocos Norte in 1830.

=== American invasion era ===
On October 15, 1903, by virtue of Act No. 945, entitled “An Act Reducing the Twenty-five Municipalities of the Province of Zambales to Fifteen,” while still part of the Province of Zambales, the municipality of Bani retained its existing boundaries.

On November 30, 1903, by virtue of Act No. 1004, the municipalities of Bolinao, Alaminos, San Isidro (Burgos), and Infanta were annexed to the Province of Pangasinan.

On December 19, 1903, by virtue of Act No. 1029, Act No. 1004 was amended to include the municipalities of Anda, Bani, and Agno among those annexed to the Province of Pangasinan.

=== Contemporary ===
During the time of Martial Law, the mayor of Bani was Marcelo Navarro, a member of the Liberal Party. After the People Power of 1986, the Officer-in-Charge who headed Bani was Edmundo Cacho The Immaculate Conception, Patron Saint of San Simon, disappeared from the church altar and was discovered on top of the tall Bani tree in the vicinity of the present Church. She was brought to the Namagbagan Church, and returned to the present site. Bani's name came from the Bani tree where the image of the Patroness was found. Bani (Millettia pinnata) is a smooth tree (height of 8 to 25 meters).

In May 2009, Bani along with Anda and Bolinao, was severely damaged by Typhoon Emong. The typhoon damaged an office close to the Municipal Building, the Western Pangasinan Lyceum, and a lot of structures and houses.

== Geography ==
The Municipality of Bani lies between Tambac Bay and the South China Sea, and Alaminos and Bolinao. It has a land area of 19,243.6075 hectares.

Bani is situated 53.33 kilometres (33.14 mi) from the provincial capital Lingayen, and 262.26 kilometres (162.96 mi) from the country's capital city of Manila.

=== Barangays ===
Bani is politically subdivided into 27 barangays. Each barangay consists of puroks and some have sitios.

- Ambabaay
- Aporao
- Arwas
- Ballag
- Banog Norte
- Banog Sur
- Calabeng
- Centro Toma
- Colayo
- Dacap Norte
- Dacap Sur
- Garrita
- Luac
- Macabit
- Masidem
- Poblacion
- Quinaoayanan
- Ranao
- Ranom Iloco
- San Jose
- San Miguel
- San Simon
- San Vicente
- Tiep
- Tipor
- Tugui Grande
- Tugui Norte

=== Climate ===
Climate data for Bani, Pangasinan
Month	Jan	Feb	Mar	Apr	May	Jun	Jul	Aug	Sep	Oct	Nov	Dec	Year
Mean daily maximum °C (°F)	31 (88)	31 (88)	32 (90)	34 (93)	35 (95)	34 (93)	32 (90)	32 (90)	32 (90)	32 (90)	32 (90)	31 (88)	32 (90)
Mean daily minimum °C (°F)	22 (72)	22 (72)	22 (72)	24 (75)	24 (75)	24 (75)	24 (75)	24 (75)	24 (75)	23 (73)	23 (73)	22 (72)	23 (74)
Average precipitation mm (inches)	13.6 (0.54)	10.4 (0.41)	18.2 (0.72)	15.7 (0.62)	178.4 (7.02)	227.9 (8.97)	368 (14.5)	306.6 (12.07)	310.6 (12.23)	215.7 (8.49)	70.3 (2.77)	31.1 (1.22)	1,766.5 (69.56)
Average rainy days	3	2	2	4	14	16	23	21	24	15	10	6	140
Source: World Weather Online

== Demographics ==
Population census of Bani

Year	Pop.	±% p.a.
1903	4,440	—
1918	8,109	+4.10%
1939	14,565	+2.83%
1948	18,402	+2.63%
1960	23,758	+2.15%
1970	25,176	+0.58%

Year	Pop.	±% p.a.
1975	27,549	+1.82%
1980	29,102	+1.10%
1990	37,180	+2.48%
1995	37,463	+0.14%
2000	42,824	+2.91%
2007	45,652	+0.89%

Year	Pop.	±% p.a.
2010	45,758	+0.08%
2015	50,306	+1.82%
2020	52,603	+0.94%
2024	52,715	+0.05%

Source: Philippine Statistics Authority

=== Religion ===
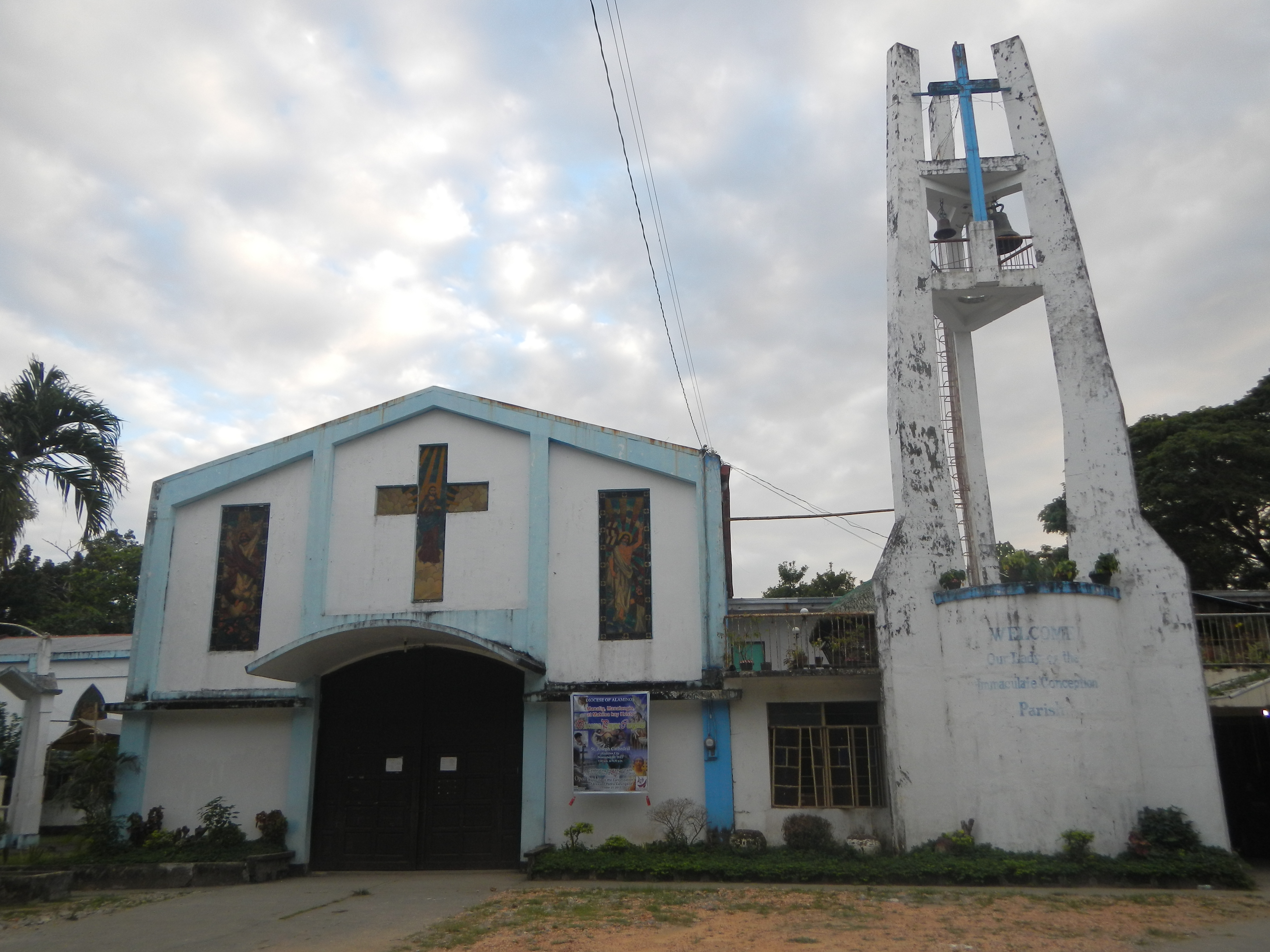
1762 Immaculate Conception of the Blessed Virgin Mary Parish Church facade

Roman Catholic population of Bani is 28,686 or 66.98% while the Philippine Independent Church (Aglipayan) population is 7,859 or 18.35%. Other churches include Bani United Methodist Church and Iglesia ni Cristo (Church of Christ) Lokal ng Bani, inter alia.

The 1762 Immaculate Conception of the Blessed Virgin Mary Parish Church (Poblacion, Bani) is under Co Pastor, Fr. Raymond Oligane and Fr. Fernando Castillo. Feast day is December 8, with its Parish Priest, Fr. Roberto Casaclang, Vicariate of the Divine Savior, Vicar Forane, Father Eduardo E. Inacay. is part of the Roman Catholic Diocese of Alaminos (Roman Catholic Archdiocese of Lingayen-Dagupan).

== Economy ==
Poverty incidence of Bani

Source: Philippine Statistics Authority

== Government ==
=== Local government ===
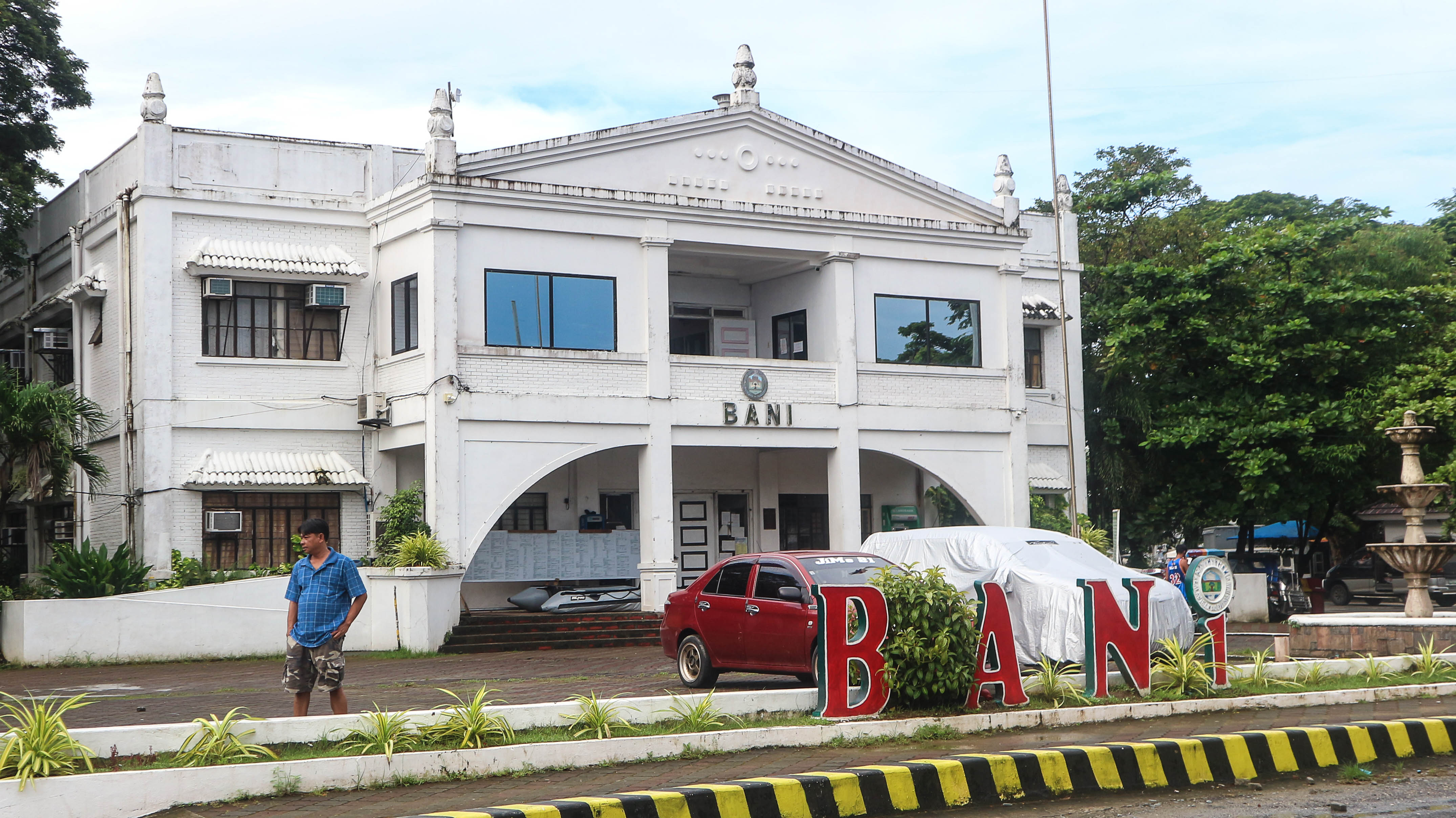
The municipal hall in 2019

Bani, belonging to the first congressional district of the province of Pangasinan, is governed by a mayor designated as its local chief executive and by a municipal council as its legislative body in accordance with the Local Government Code. The mayor, vice mayor, and the councilors are elected directly by the people through an election which is being held every three years.

=== Municipal seal ===
The Official Seal was adopted in Resolution No. 7 on 7 March 1991.

=== Elected officials ===
Members of the Bani Municipal Government (2025-2028)
Position	Name
Congressman	Arthur F. Celeste (NP)
Municipal Mayor	Facundo O. Palafox (NP)
Municipal Vice-Mayor	Cothera Gwen P. Yamamoto (NP)
Municipal Councilors	Mark Gringo B. Ampler (NP)
Municipal Councilors	Ronaldo C. Catabay (NP)
Municipal Councilors	Frebien Jake M. Amosig (NP)
Municipal Councilors	Jovy Lynne C. Olores (NP)
Municipal Councilors	Filipina C. Rivera (API)
Municipal Councilors	Alvin C. Camba (NP)
Municipal Councilors	Emilio Q. Olores II (NP)
Municipal Councilors	Noel I. Talania (API)

== Tourism ==
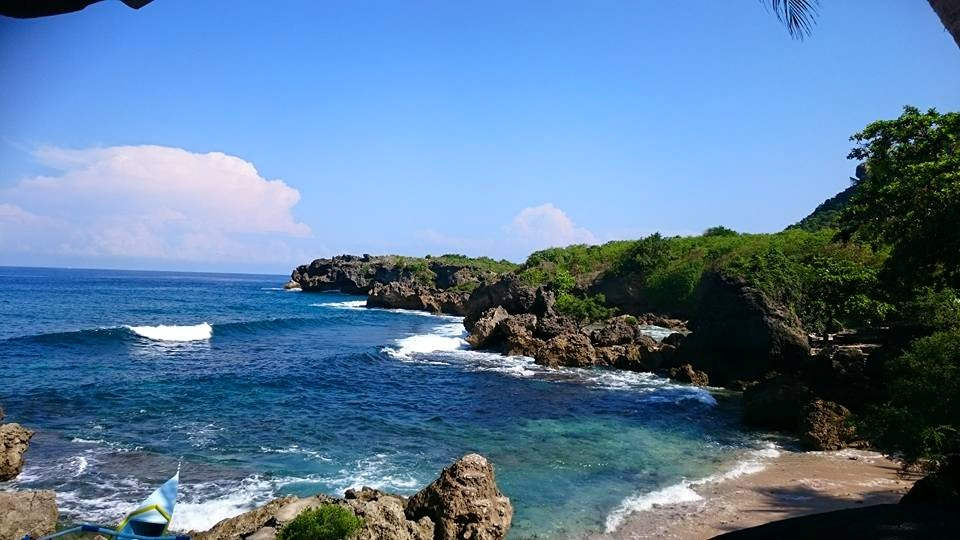
Surip beach

Attractions include:

- 1,000 step "Via Crucis" leading to the gigantic Redeemer's Cross perched on a plateau overlooking the South China Sea of Doña Segundina Enriquez Navarro, wife Mayor Marcelo C. Navarro. Annual Archdiocesan Penitential Pilgrimage every Holy Tuesday first held in 1975.
- Rock formations along the shores.
- Bird Watching at Bangrin Mangroves
- Olanen Beach, Tobong Beach - Dacap Sur
- Surip Beach in Sitio Olanen, Barangay Dacap Sur - scuba diving, snorkeling and recreational fishing of tropical fishes and lobsters
- Surip Beach Mountain Resort, Hide Away Sea and Beach Resort, Cacho Beach Resor
- Oldwoods by the Sea Eco Resort - Olanen
- Surip Cave, Nalsoc Cave, Abot Aso Cave, Nangadiyan Cave, and the Dumaloy Cave.
- Nalsoc Cave is a subterranean river with natural archway of stalactites and stalagmites, Barangay Colayo: Cave Formations (Speleothems), Dripstone, Straws, Stalactites, Stalagmites, Columns or Pillars and Shawls.
- Cacho Beach Resort Bani Pangasinan
- Baliwangga falls, Barangay Ranao, near Ranao Elementary School.
- Bani Public Auditorium and Children's Playground
- The Manuel Oboza Lara-Edralin Auditorium, Poblacion
- Bani is noted for producing the sweet and juicy watermelon.

== Education ==
The Bani Schools District Office governs all educational institutions within the municipality. It oversees the management and operations of all private and public elementary and high schools.

=== Primary and elementary schools ===
- Abunciang Elementary School
- Ambabaay Elementary School
- Aporao Elementary School
- Arwas Elementary School
- Ballag Elementary School
- Bani West Central School
- Banog Norte Elementary School
- Banog Sur Elementary School
- Bogtong Elementary School
- Calabeng Elementary School
- Centro Toma Elementary School
- Colayo Elementary School
- Dacap Norte Elementary School
- Dacap Sur Elementary School
- Full of Grace School
- Garrita Elementary School
- Immaculate Concepcion Learning Center
- Luac Elementary School
- Macabit Elementary School
- Masidem Elementary School
- Quinaoayanan Elementary School
- Ranao Elementary School
- Ranom Iloco Elementary School
- San Jose Elementary School
- San Miguel Elementary School
- San Simon Elementary School
- San Vicente Elementary School
- Tiep Elementary School
- Tipor Elementary School
- Tugui Grande Elementary School
- Tugui Norte Daycare Center School

=== Secondary schools ===
- Bani National High School
- Banog Sur National High School
- Bani East Integrated School
- Dacap Norte National High School
- Garrita National High School
- Quinaoayanan National High School
- Ranao National High School
- Ranom Iloco National High School
- San Miguel National High School
- Tiep National High School

== Notable personalities ==
- Mylene Paat, Volleyball Player of Farm Fresh Foxies and former player of Philippines National Volleyball Team
- Jane Oineza, actress, ex-Goin' Bulilit member, and ex-PBB housemate
- Oscar Orbos, a TV host and former Pangasinan governor
- Tim Orbos, the team owner of Pangasinan Presidents & Pangasinan Waves in the MBA.
