= Infanta, Pangasinan =

Municipality in Pangasinan, Philippines

Infanta
- Municipality
- Municipality of Infanta
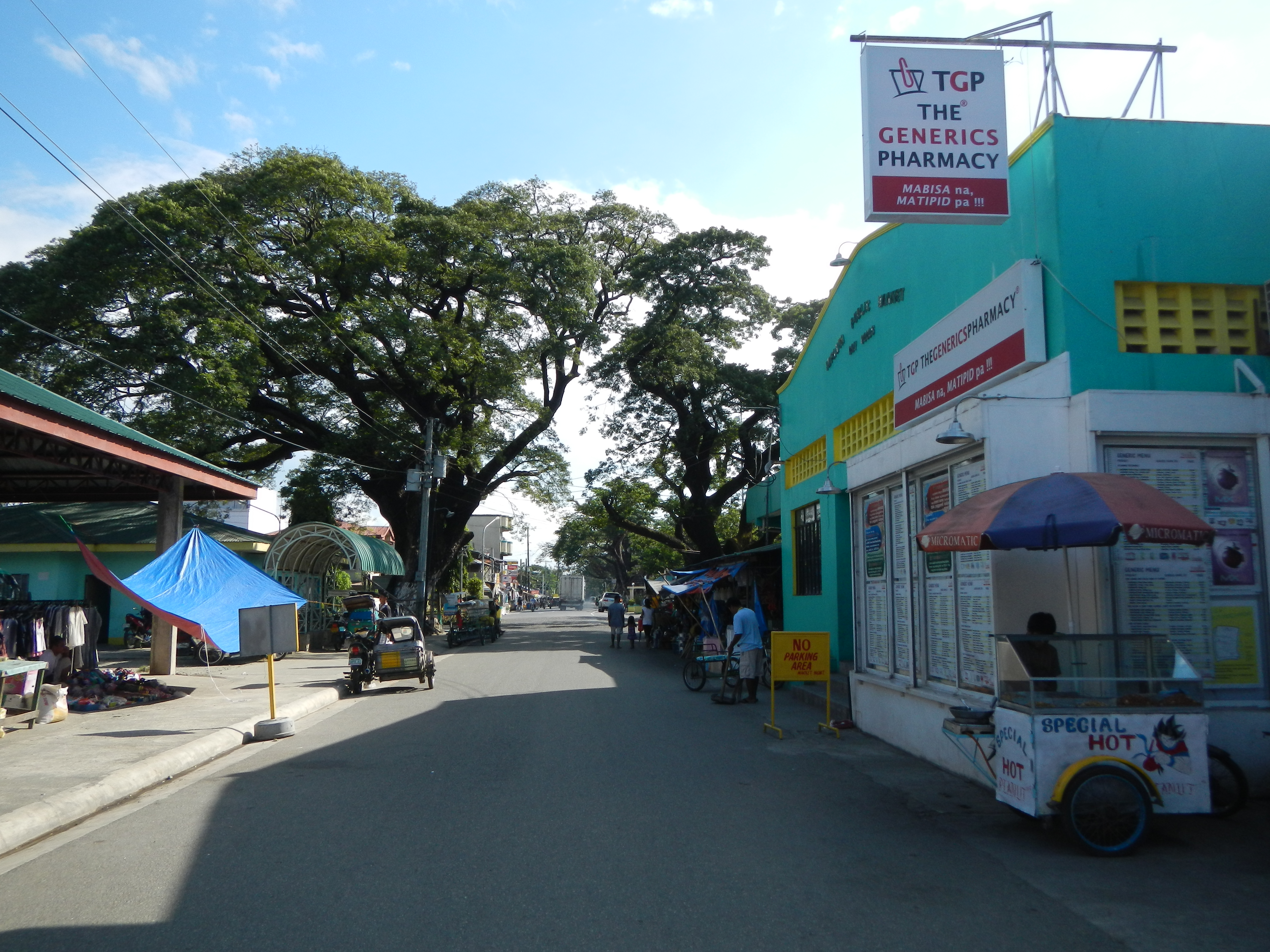
- Downtown area

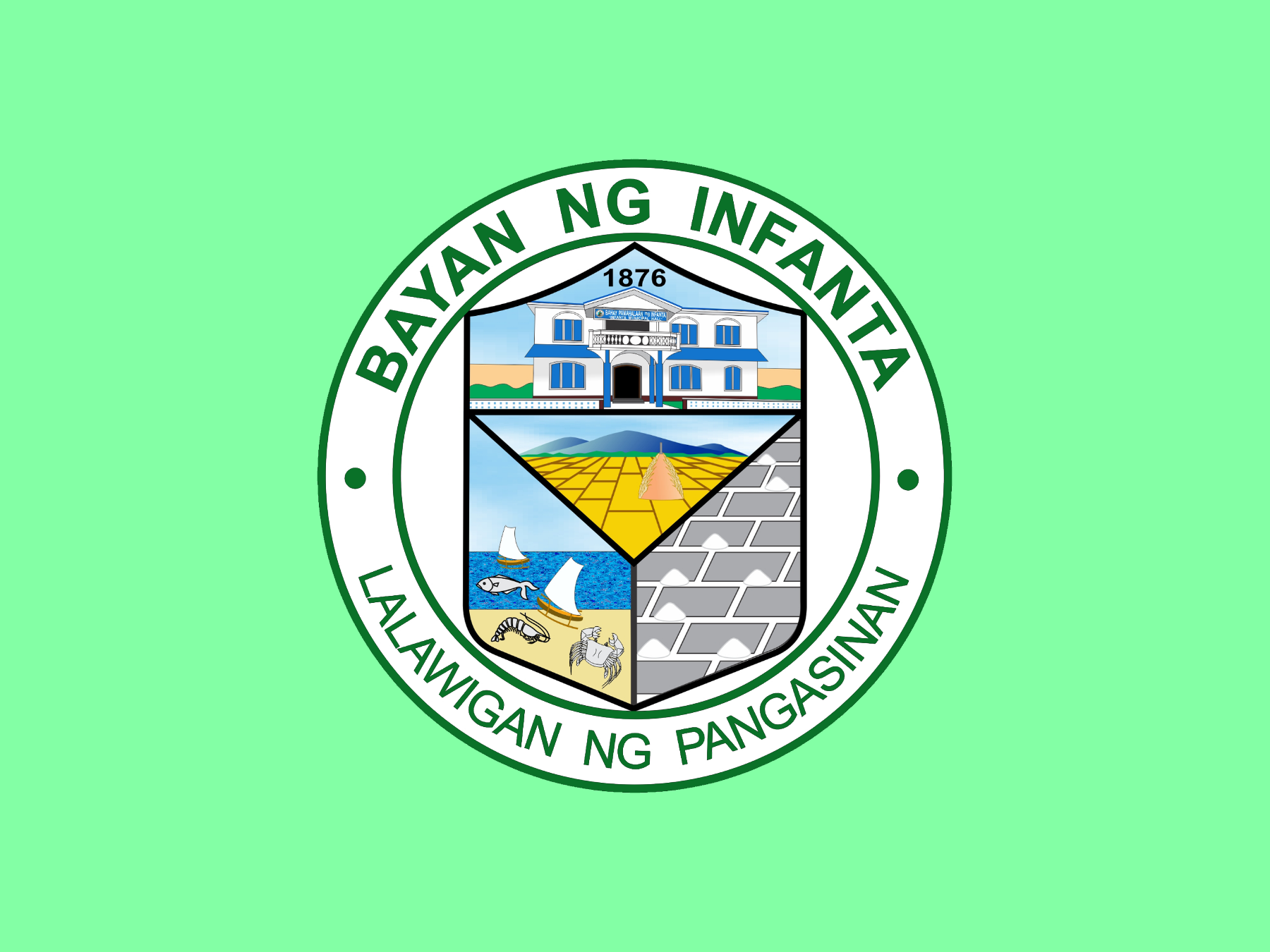
- Flag Seal

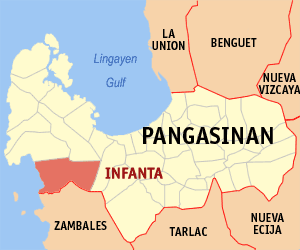
- Map of Pangasinan with Infanta highlighted
- Interactive map of Infanta
- Location within the Philippines
- Coordinates: 15°49′15″N 119°54′30″E
- Country: Philippines
- Region: Ilocos Region
- Province: Pangasinan
- District: 1st district
- Founded: October 4, 1876
- Named for: Isabella II of Spain
- Barangays: 13 (see Barangays)

Government
  - Type: Sangguniang Bayan
  - Mayor: Virgilio F. Vallarta (API)
  - Vice Mayor: Erdolfa A. Soriano (NP)
  - Representative: Arthur F. Celeste (NP)
  - Municipal Council: Members: Charlito A. Maniago Sr. (NP); Jesse M. Beltran (NP); Ferdinand A. Dela Cruz (IND); Nancy P. Millorca (NP); Alex M. Maniago Jr. (NP); Percival A. Mallare (API); Randy F. Gabuyo (NP); Rafael M. Merza (API)
  - Electorate: 18,476 voters (2025)

Area
  - Total: 254.29 km^{2} (98.18 sq mi)
- Highest elevation: 163 m (535 ft)
- Lowest elevation: 0 m (0 ft)

Population (2024 census)
  - Total: 26,837
  - Density: 105.54/km^{2} (273.34/sq mi)
  - Households: 6,460

Economy
  - Income class: 2nd municipal income class
  - Poverty incidence: 18.24% (2023)
  - Revenue: ₱ 223.4 million (2024)
  - Assets: ₱ 566.5 million (2024)
  - Expenditure: ₱ 199.7 million (2024)
  - Liabilities: ₱ 128.4 million (2024)

Service provider
  - Electricity: Pangasinan 1 Electric Cooperative (PANELCO 1)
- Time zone: UTC+8 (PST)
- ZIP code: 2412
- PSGC: 0105520000
- IDD : area code: +63 (0)75
- Native languages: Pangasinan; Sambal; Ilocano; Tagalog
- Website: infantapangasinan.gov.ph

Infanta, officially the Municipality of Infanta (Pangasinan: Baley na Infanta; Ilocano: Ili ti Infanta; Sambal: Babali nin Infanta; Filipino: Bayan ng Infanta), is a municipality in the province of Pangasinan, Philippines. According to the 2024 census, it has a population of 26,837 people.

== Etymology ==
According to the official website of the province of Pangasinan, Infanta was named after the "Infanta queen Isabela", which referred to Isabella II of Spain. Additionally, the word "infanta" itself means "young," as it was an "offspring" created out of Santa Cruz, Zambales.

== History ==
Originally a barrio, Infanta was created out of Santa Cruz, Zambales on October 4, 1876 to become an independent municipality by virtue of a Superior Decree by the Spanish colonial government. Infanta was gradually populated by Ilocano settlers from Paoay, Ilocos Norte over the years.

On October 15, 1903, by virtue of Act No. 945, entitled “An Act Reducing the Twenty-five Municipalities of the Province of Zambales to Fifteen,” while still part of the Province of Zambales, the municipality of Infanta retained its existing boundaries.

On November 30, 1903, by virtue of Act No. 1004, the municipalities of Bolinao, Alaminos, San Isidro (Burgos), and Infanta were annexed to the Province of Pangasinan.

On December 19, 1903, by virtue of Act No. 1029, Act No. 1004 was amended to include the municipalities of Anda, Bani, and Agno among those annexed to the Province of Pangasinan.

On October 26, 1904, the barrio of Eguia, then a part of the municipality of San Isidro (Burgos), was annexed to and consolidated with the municipality of Infanta.

Through Presidential Proclamation 693, October 4, 2024 was declared a special non-working day in celebration of its 148th founding anniversary.

== Geography ==
Infanta is situated 88.62 kilometres (55.07 mi) from the provincial capital Lingayen, and 297.43 kilometres (184.81 mi) from the country's capital city of Manila. It is between Santa Cruz, Zambales and Dasol on the Olongapo–Bugallon Road.

=== Barangays ===
Infanta is politically subdivided into 13 barangays. Each barangay consists of puroks and some have sitios.

- Bamban
- Batang
- Bayambang
- Cato
- Doliman
- Patima
- Maya
- Nangalisan
- Nayom
- Pita
- Poblacion
- Potol
- Babuyan

=== Climate ===
Climate data for Infanta, Pangasinan
Month	Jan	Feb	Mar	Apr	May	Jun	Jul	Aug	Sep	Oct	Nov	Dec	Year
Mean daily maximum °C (°F)	31 (88)	31 (88)	31 (88)	33 (91)	32 (90)	32 (90)	30 (86)	30 (86)	30 (86)	31 (88)	31 (88)	31 (88)	31 (88)
Mean daily minimum °C (°F)	21 (70)	21 (70)	22 (72)	24 (75)	24 (75)	24 (75)	23 (73)	23 (73)	23 (73)	23 (73)	23 (73)	22 (72)	23 (73)
Average precipitation mm (inches)	5.1 (0.20)	11.6 (0.46)	21.1 (0.83)	27.7 (1.09)	232.9 (9.17)	350.8 (13.81)	679.8 (26.76)	733.1 (28.86)	505 (19.9)	176.6 (6.95)	67.2 (2.65)	17.7 (0.70)	2,828.6 (111.38)
Average rainy days	3	3	3	4	14	18	23	25	22	15	8	4	142
Source: World Weather Online

== Demographics ==
Population census of Infanta
Year	Pop.	±% p.a.
1903	3,546	—
1918	5,613	+3.11%
1939	5,453	−0.14%
1948	5,379	−0.15%
1960	7,582	+2.90%
1970	10,469	+3.28%
1975	11,336	+1.61%
1980	12,323	+1.68%
1990	16,149	+2.74%
1995	18,839	+2.93%
2000	20,632	+1.97%
2007	23,731	+1.95%
2010	23,455	−0.42%
2015	24,584	+0.90%
2020	26,242	+1.38%
2024	26,837	+0.54%
Source: Philippine Statistics Authority

=== Languages ===
The people of Infanta are generally speak Pangasinan, Sambal, and Ilocano.

== Economy ==
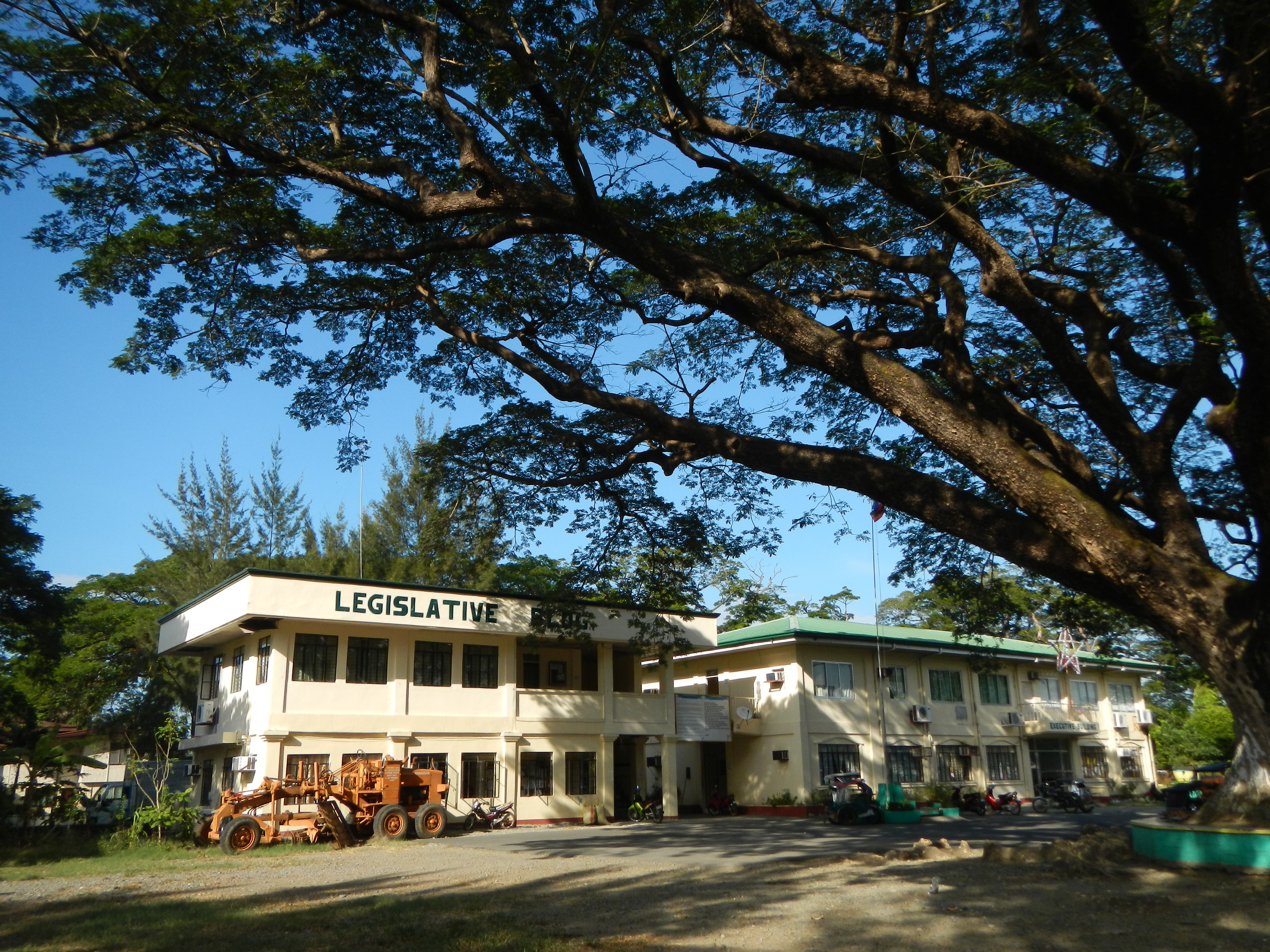
Infanta Town Hall

Poverty incidence of Infanta (%)

Source: Philippine Statistics Authority

== Government ==
=== Local government ===
Infanta is part of the first congressional district of the province of Pangasinan. It is governed by a mayor, designated as its local chief executive, and by a municipal council as its legislative body in accordance with the Local Government Code. The mayor, vice mayor, and the councilors are elected directly by the people through an election which is being held every three years.

=== Elected officials ===
Members of the Infanta Municipal Government (2025-2028)
Position	Name
Congressman	Arthur F. Celeste (NP)
Municipal Mayor	Virgilio F. Vallarta (API)
Municipal Vice-Mayor	Erdolfa A. Soriano (NP)
Municipal Councilors	Charlito A. Maniago Sr. (NP)
Municipal Councilors	Jesse M. Beltran (NP)
Municipal Councilors	Ferdinand A. Dela Cruz (IND)
Municipal Councilors	Nancy P. Millorca (NP)
Municipal Councilors	Alex M. Maniago Jr. (NP)
Municipal Councilors	Percival A. Mallare (API)
Municipal Councilors	Randy F. Gabuyo (NP)
Municipal Councilors	Rafael M. Merza (API)

== Education ==
The Infanta Schools District Office governs all educational institutions within the municipality. It oversees the management and operations of all private and public elementary and high schools.

=== Primary and elementary schools ===
- Atel-Batang Elementary School
- Babuyan Elementary School
- Bamban Norte Elementary School
- Bamban Sur Elementary School
- Bayambang Elementary School
- Cato Elementary School
- Doliman Elementary School
- Maringindingin Elementary School
- Maya Elementary School
- Nangalisan San Juan Elementary School
- Nayom Elementary School
- Patima Elementary School
- Potol Elementary School
- St. John's Institute
- St. John Learning Center

=== Secondary schools ===
- Bayambang National High School
- Cato National High School
- Infanta Integrated School
- Pita Integrated School
