= Arthur Celeste =

Filipino politician (born 1962)

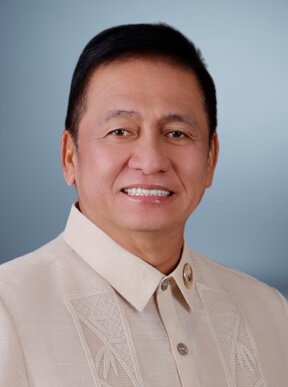
- Official portrait, 2025

Member of the House of Representatives from Pangasinan’s 1st District
- Incumbent
- Assumed office June 30, 2022
- Preceded by: Arnold Celeste
- In office June 30, 2001 – June 30, 2010
- Preceded by: Hernani Braganza
- Succeeded by: Jesus Celeste

Mayor of Alaminos, Pangasinan
- In office June 30, 2013 – June 30, 2019
- Vice Mayor: Earl James Aquino (2013–2016); Anton Perez (2016–2019)
- Preceded by: Hernani Braganza
- Succeeded by: Bryan Celeste

Personal details
- Born: Arthur del Fierro Celeste; December 14, 1962 (age 63) Bolinao, Pangasinan, Philippines
- Party: Nacionalista (2018–present)
- Other political affiliations: NPC (2012–2018); Lakas (2007–2012); KAMPI (2004–2007); Independent (2001–2004)
- Spouse: Chloe Caasi
- Children: 4
- Education: Far Eastern University (BA); University of Pangasinan (LLB)
- Occupation: Politician

Arthur "Art" del Fierro Celeste Sr. (born December 14, 1962) is a Filipino politician. He is currently representing the 1st District of Pangasinan in the House of Representatives of the Philippines since 2022, a position he previously held from 2001 to 2010. He served as mayor of Alaminos, Pangasinan from 2013 to 2019.

== Early life and education ==
Celeste was born on December 14, 1962, in Bolinao, to Raymundo Celeste and Palaway del Fierro. He studied Luciente 1 Elementary School for his primary education. He studied Cape Bolinao High School for his secondary education. He studied at the Far Eastern University in Manila with a degree in political science. He took up Bachelor of Laws at the University of Pangasinan where he graduated in 1988.

== Political career ==
Before he entered local politics, Celeste was served as barangay captain of Luciente 1 in Bolinao. He also became a president of the Liga ng mga Barangay from 1989 to 1997.

In 2001, Celeste elected as representative of the first district of Pangasinan for three consecutive terms.

In 2010, Celeste ran for mayor of Alaminos but he lost to Hernani Braganza.

In 2013, Celeste became a mayor of Alaminos for two terms.

In 2019, Celeste ran for governor of Pangasinan but he lost to Amado Espino III.

In 2022, Celeste returned as representative of the first district of Pangasinan.

== Personal life ==
Celeste is married to Chloe Caasi and has four children. His children are Arth Bryan, is currently serving as mayor of Alaminos (2019–present) and Arthur Jr., served as councilor of Alaminos (2022–2025).

His brothers, Jesus Celeste, served as representative of the first district of Pangasinan from 2010 to 2019 and Arnold Celeste, also served as representative of the first district of Pangasinan from 2019 to 2022.

== Electoral performance ==
=== 2025 ===
Candidate	Party	Votes	%
Arthur Celeste (incumbent)	Nacionalista Party	187,173	100.00
Total		187,173	100.00
Valid votes		187,173	72.72
Invalid/blank votes		70,230	27.28
Total votes		257,403	100.00
Registered voters/turnout		303,690	84.76
Nacionalista Party hold			
Source: Commission on Elections

=== 2022 ===
Candidate	Party	Votes	%
Arthur Celeste	Nacionalista Party	155,372	65.19
Oscar Orbos	Aksyon Demokratiko	82,983	34.81
Total		238,355	100.00
Total votes		255,660	–
Registered voters/turnout		294,221	86.89
Nacionalista Party hold			
Source: Commission on Elections

=== 2019 ===
Candidate	Party	Votes	%
Amado Espino III (incumbent)	PDP-Laban	781,307	57.29
Arthur Celeste	Nacionalista	582,380	42.71
Total		1,363,687	100.00
Registered voters/turnout		1,705,260	–
PDP-Laban hold			

=== 2016 ===
2016 Alaminos, Pangasinan mayoralty election
Party	Candidate	Votes	%
NPC	Arthur Celeste	24,899	
Liberal	Earl James Aquino	13,417	
Total votes			
NPC hold			

=== 2013 ===
2013 Alaminos, Pangasinan mayoralty election
Party	Candidate	Votes	%
NPC	Arthur Celeste	15,373	
Liberal	Lean Braganza	11,606	
Total votes			
NPC gain from Liberal			

=== 2007 ===
2007 Philippine House of Representatives elections
Party	Candidate	Votes	%
KAMPI	Arthur Celeste	102,247	
LDP	Alberto Braganza	35,677	
Valid ballots			
Invalid or blank votes			
Total votes			
KAMPI hold			
