= List of implicated parties in the pork barrel scam =

This list compiles individuals and non government organizations (NGOs) in the Philippines implicated in the Priority Development Assistance Fund scam, otherwise known as the pork barrel scam.

== Implicated individuals ==
List of linked individuals to the PDAF scam
Accused	Political position	Party	Claimed by	Other remarks
Florencio Abad	Secretary of Budget and Management	Liberal	Daily Tribune; Panfilo Lacson	Former congressman. Daily Tribune claims according to its sources that it was Abad that taught Janet Napoles on how to operate the PDAF scam scheme.
Proceso Alcala	Secretary of Agriculture	Liberal	Daily Tribune Panfilo Lacson	
Robert Barbers	Senator (former, deceased)	Lakas	Panfilo Lacson	
Erwin Chiongbian	House Representative	Lakas	Inquirer; Panfilo Lacson	
Samuel Dangwa	House Representative	Lakas	Inquirer; Panfilo Lacson	
Juan Ponce Enrile	Senator	PMP	Inquirer, Daily Tribune, Janet Lim Napoles Panfilo Lacson	
Jinggoy Estrada	Senator	PMP	Inquirer, Daily Tribune, Janet Lim Napoles Panfilo Lacson	
Robert Raymond Estrella	House Representative	Abono	Inquirer; Panfilo Lacson	
Conrado Estrella III	House Representative	NPC	Inquirer; Panfilo Lacson	
Gregorio Honasan	Senator	Independent	Inquirer	
Lito Lapid	Senator	Independent	Daily Tribune	
Loren Legarda	Senator	NPC	Daily Tribune Panfilo Lacson	
Bongbong Marcos	Senator/House Representative	Nacionalista	Inquirer	
Janet Lim Napoles	N/A	Independent		Businesswoman, dubbed by the media as the mastermind of the PDAF scam.
Koko Pimentel	Senator	PDP–Laban	Panfilo Lacson	
Rodolfo Plaza	House Representative	NPC	Inquirer; Panfilo Lacson	
Mat Ranillo III	N/A	N/A	Behur Luy, Ruby Tuason	Former actor. According to Tuason and Luy, Ranillo delivered over ₱11 million pesos of pork barrel kickbacks to Justa Tantoco, friend of Jinggoy Estrada's family.
Mikey Arroyo	House Representatives	Lakas	Inquirer, Napolist	Former actor and former President Gloria Macapagal Arroyo's son.
Bong Revilla	Senator	Lakas	Inquirer, Daily Tribune, Janet Lim Napoles Panfilo Lacson	
Tito Sotto	Senator	NPC	Daily Tribune Panfilo Lacson	
Rizalina Seachon-Lanete	House Representative	NPC	Inquirer; Panfilo Lacson	
Justa Tantoco	N/A	N/A	Benhur Luy, Ruby Tuason	Family friend of Estrada. According to Tuason and Luy, former actor, Matt Ranillo delivered over ₱11 million pesos of pork barrel kickbacks to Justa Tantoco.
Edgar L. Valdez	House Representative	APEC	Inquirer; Panfilo Lacson	
Manuel Villar	Senator	Nacionalista	Janet Lim Napoles, Daily Tribune Panfilo Lacson	

== Implicated organizations ==
- JLN Corporation - company of Janet Lim-Napoles.
- Agri and Economic Program for Farmers Foundation, Inc. (AEPFFI)
- Agricultura Para sa Magbubukid Foundation (APMFI)
- Countrywide Agri and Rural Economic Development (CARED) Foundation
- Masaganang Ani Para sa Magsasaka Foundation, Inc (MAMFI)
- People's Organization for Progress and Development Foundation (POPDFI)
- Philippine Agri and Social Development Foundation Inc.
- Philippine Social Development Foundation, Inc. (PSDFI)
- Social Development Program for Farmers Foundation, Inc. (SDPFFI)
