= Conrado Estrella =

Conrado Estrella may refer to:

- Conrado Estrella Sr. (1917–2011), Filipino politician, grandfather of Conrado Estrella III
- Conrado Estrella III (born 1960), Filipino politician
