= Hernani Braganza =

Filipino politician (born 1964)

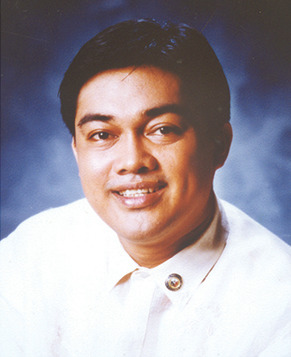
- Braganza as a member of the House of Representatives during the 11th Congress

Secretary of Agrarian Reform
- In office February 12, 2001 – January 15, 2003
- President: Gloria Macapagal Arroyo
- Preceded by: Horacio Morales
- Succeeded by: Roberto Pagdanganan

Member of the House of Representatives from Pangasinan's 1st district
- In office June 30, 1995 – February 12, 2001
- Preceded by: Oscar Orbos
- Succeeded by: Arthur Celeste

Press Secretary
- In office January 20 – June 17, 2003
- President: Gloria Macapagal Arroyo
- Preceded by: Ignacio Bunye
- Succeeded by: Milton Alingod

Mayor of Alaminos, Pangasinan
- In office June 30, 2004 – June 30, 2013
- Vice Mayor: Teofilo Humilde Jr. (2004–2010); Cesar Manzano (2010–2013)
- Preceded by: Eduardo Fontelera
- Succeeded by: Arthur Celeste

Personal details
- Born: Hernani Agsalud Braganza; August 7, 1964 (age 62) Quezon City, Philippines
- Party: Aksyon Dapat (partylist; 2024–present)
- Other political affiliations: Liberal (2009–2013); Lakas (1995–2009); Independent (1995)
- Spouse: Stella Marie Jaro

Hernani "Nani" Agsalud Braganza (born August 7, 1964) is a former Filipino politician and government official. He served under the administration of President Gloria Macapagal Arroyo as secretary of agrarian reform from 2001 to 2003, and briefly as press secretary from January to June 2003. Braganza also served in the House of Representatives as the representative for Pangasinan's 1st district from 1995 to 2001.

== Early life and education ==
Braganza was born on August 7, 1964 in Quezon City to Pedro Braganza and Purita Agsalud, a cousin of former senator Leticia Ramos-Shahani and former president Fidel V. Ramos. He received his Bachelor of Arts degree in Political Science at De La Salle University.

== Political career ==
=== House of Representatives (1995–2001) ===
In 1995, Braganza ran as an independent and was elected to the House of Representatives as the representative for Pangasinan's 1st district, succeeding Oscar Orbos who was elected provincial governor. He served until February 2001, when he resigned upon appointment by President Gloria Macapagal Arroyo as secretary of agrarian reform.

=== Cabinet service (2001–2004) ===
Braganza served as secretary of agrarian reform until January 2003. He was later appointed press secretary by Arroyo on January 20, 2003. He also joined the Office of the Presidential Adviser on the Peace Process as a member of the government's negotiating panel for peace talks with the CPP–NPA–NDF from March of the same year until January 2004.

He was also the Presidential Adviser for Political Affairs from 2003 to 2004.

=== Mayor of Alaminos, Pangasinan (2004–2013) ===
After his cabinet service, Braganza ran for mayor of Alaminos City in Pangasinan, where he won three consecutive terms from 2004 to 2013, running as a member of the ruling party Lakas–CMD in 2004 and 2007, and switching to the Liberal Party (which also became the ruling party after President Benigno Aquino III's victory) in 2009.

In January 2013, complaints for plunder and malversation of public funds were filed against Braganza before the Ombudsman, which he denied stating that the 15 current and former barangay officials serving as complainants only requested an investigation on the matter.

=== 2013 gubernatorial campaign ===
Braganza launched a bid for the governorship of Pangasinan in 2013 against incumbent Amado Espino Jr., but lost, receiving 25% of the vote. He was notably supported by former president Fidel V. Ramos, while sister Leticia supported Espino.

=== 2025 congressional campaign ===
Braganza founded and became the first nominee of the Aksyon Dapat party-list in the 2025 House elections, but it placed 123rd, failing to win a seat.

=== Television hosting ===
As of 2026, Braganza serves as a co-anchor on the Bilyonaryo News Channel program The Spokes, alongside former presidential spokesperson Edwin Lacierda and press secretary Trixie Cruz-Angeles.

== Electoral history ==
Electoral history of Hernani Braganza
Year	Office	Party	Votes received				Result
Year	Office	Party	Total	%	P.	Swing	Result
1995	Representative (Pangasinan–1st)	Independent	35,150	34.97%	1st	—N/a	Won
1998	Representative (Pangasinan–1st)	Lakas	108,604	100.00%	1st	+65.03	Unopposed
2004	Mayor of Alaminos, Pangasinan	Lakas	—N/a	—N/a	1st	—N/a	Won
2007	Mayor of Alaminos, Pangasinan	Lakas	—N/a	—N/a	1st	—N/a	Won
2010	Mayor of Alaminos, Pangasinan	Liberal	19,158	—N/a	1st	—N/a	Won
2013	Governor of Pangasinan	Liberal	297,409	25.88%	2nd	—N/a	Lost
2025	Representative (Party-list)	Aksyon Dapat	58,916	0.15	123rd	—N/a	Lost

House of Representatives of the Philippines
Preceded by Oscar Orbos	Member of the Philippine House of Representatives for Pangasinan's 1st district 1995–2001	Succeeded by Arthur Celeste
Political offices
Preceded by Eduardo Fontelera	Mayor of Alaminos, Pangasinan; 2004–2013	Succeeded by Arthur Celeste
Preceded by Horacio Morales	Press Secretary; 2003	Succeeded by Roberto Pagdanganan
Preceded by Ignacio Bunye	Secretary of Agrarian Reform; 2001–2003	Succeeded by Milton Alingod
