= Robert Raymond Estrella =

Filipino politician

Robert Raymund Estrella
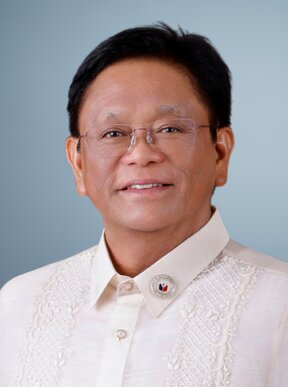
- Official portrait, 2025

Member of the House of Representatives of the Philippines for Abono Partylist
- Incumbent
- Assumed office October 2, 2025
- In office July 25, 2022 – June 30, 2025
- In office June 30, 2007 – June 30, 2013

Personal details
- Born: Robert Raymund Masonsong Estrella; September 2, 1962 (age 63) Manila, Philippines
- Party: Abono Partylist
- Relatives: Conrado Estrella III (brother), Conrado Estrella Jr. (father), Conrado Estrella Sr. (grandfather)
- Occupation: Politician

Robert Raymund 'Eskimo' Masonsong Estrella is a politician and is currently the representative of Abono Partylist, a Filipino political party.

== Career ==
He was elected as a representative of the Filipino political party Abono Partylist from 2010 to 2013, his brother later succeeded him.

He was elected again as a representative of Abono Partylist in the 2022 Philippine House of Representatives elections.

He joined committees, including:

- Cooperatives Development – Vice Chairperson
- Government Enterprises and Privatization – Vice Chairperson
- Persons With Disabilities – Vice Chairperson
- Agrarian Reform – Member for the Majority
- Agriculture and Food – Member for the Majority
- Aquaculture and Fisheries Resources – Member for the Majority
- Banks and Financial Intermediaries – Member for the Majority
- Energy – Member for the Majority
- Food Security – Member for the Majority
- Health – Member for the Majority
- North Luzon Growth Quadrangle – Member for the Majority
- Nuclear Energy – Member for the Majority
- Transportation – Member for the Majority

Estrella was a main investigator in a case regarding an "improper" sale of 75,000 rice bags.

=== Bills ===
Estrella has principally authored 44 bills and co-authored 37 bills.

=== Pork barrel scam charges ===
In August 2015, the National Bureau of Investigation charged Estrella with graft for his alleged involvement in the multibillion-peso pork barrel scam. According to the National Bureau of Investigation, Raymond Estrella allegedly received ₱22,675,000 in kickback from pork barrel scam mastermind Janet Lim-Napoles, while his brother Conrado Estrella III received ₱45,030,000.

== Personal life ==
Robert's brother is Agrarian Reform Secretary and former congressman Conrado Estrella III.
