= Governor of Pangasinan =

Local chief executive

- Gobernador ng Lalawigan ng Pangasinan
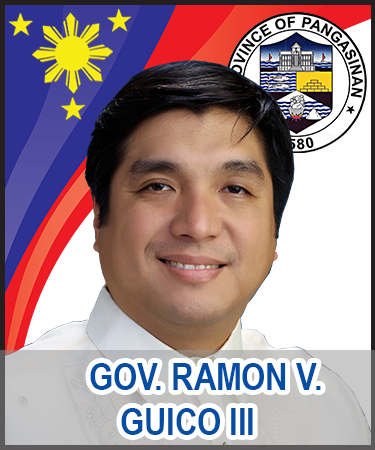
- Incumbent; Ramon V. Guico III since June 30, 2022
- Style: The Honorable
- Residence: Urduja House
- Seat: Pangasinan Provincial Capitol, Lingayen, Pangasinan
- Appointer: Direct popular vote
- Term length: 3 years
- Inaugural holder: Perfecto Sison
- Formation: 1901
- Deputy: Vice Governor

The governor of Pangasinan (Filipino: Punong lalawigan ng Pangasinan) is the highest political office in the province of Pangasinan, Philippines. Along with the Governor of Ilocos Norte, Ilocos Sur and La Union, he sits in the Regional Development Council of Ilocos Region.

== List of governors of Pangasinan ==
No.	Image	Name	Year in office
1		Perfecto Sison	February 16, 1901 – February 2, 1902
2		Macario Favila	March 2, 1902 – March 4, 1906
3		Isabelo Artacho	March 5, 1906 – March 1, 1908
4		Antonio Sison	March 2, 1908 – December 31, 1909
5		Juan Alvear	January 1, 1910 – November 26, 1912
6		Aquilino Calvo	November 27, 1912 – October 15, 1916
7		Daniel Maramba	October 16, 1916 – October 15, 1922
8		Teófilo Sison	October 16, 1922 – June 25, 1928
9		Pedro Quintans	July 19, 1928 – October 15, 1928
10		Bernabe B. Aquino	October 16, 1928 – October 15, 1931
11		Servillano dela Cruz	October 16, 1931 – October 16, 1940
12		Santiago Estrada	1941–1944
13		Sofronio C. Quimson	1945–1946
14		Enrique Braganza	1946–1951
15		Juan de G. Rodriguez	1952–1953
16		Conrado F. Estrella	1954–1963
17		Francisco Q. Duque Jr.	1963–1967
18		Cipriano Primicias Jr.	1967–1971
19		Vicente D. Millora	September 16–30, 1971
20		Aguedo F. Agbayani	1971–January 2, 1976
21		Agerico S. Rosario	January 3, 1976 – June 16, 1978 (OIC)
(20)		Aguedo F. Agbayani	June 17, 1978–March 1986
22		Demetrio G. Demetria	April 4–November 21, 1986
23		Rafael M. Colet	November 22, 1986–December 1987 (Acting)
24		Jose F.S. Bengson Jr.	December 1987 – January 1988 (OIC)
25		Rafael M. Colet	January 1988–June 30, 1992
26		Aguedo F. Agbayani	June 30, 1992 – June 30, 1995
27		Oscar M. Orbos	June 30, 1995 – June 30, 1998
28		Victor E. Agbayani	June 30, 1998 – June 30, 2007
29		Amado T. Espino Jr.	June 30, 2007 – June 30, 2016
30		Amado Ignacio Espino III	June 30, 2016 – June 30, 2022
31		Ramon V. Guico III	June 30, 2022–present

== Elections ==
- 1988 Pangasinan local elections
- 1992 Pangasinan local elections
- 1995 Pangasinan local elections
- 1998 Pangasinan local elections
- 2001 Pangasinan local elections
- 2004 Pangasinan local elections
- 2007 Pangasinan local elections
- 2010 Pangasinan local elections
- 2013 Pangasinan local elections
- 2016 Pangasinan local elections
- 2019 Pangasinan local elections
- 2022 Pangasinan local elections
- 2025 Pangasinan local elections
