= 2013 Pangasinan local elections =

- May 13, 2013
- Registered: 1,651,814
- Turnout: 81.4%
- Gubernatorial election
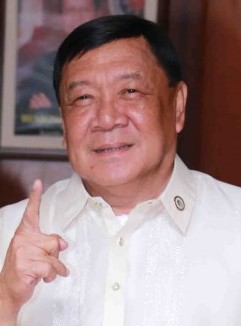

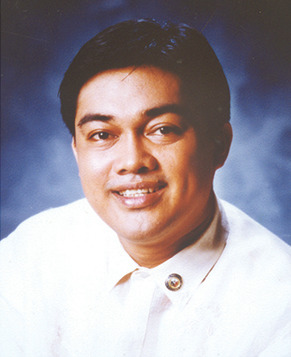
Candidate	Amado Espino Jr.	Hernani Braganza
Party	NPC	Liberal
Running mate	Jose Calimlim Jr.	Arturo Lomibao
Popular vote	851,760	297,409
Percentage	74.12%	25.88%
Governor before election
Amado Espino Jr.
Lakas–Kampi
Elected Governor
Amado Espino Jr.
NPC
- Vice gubernatorial election
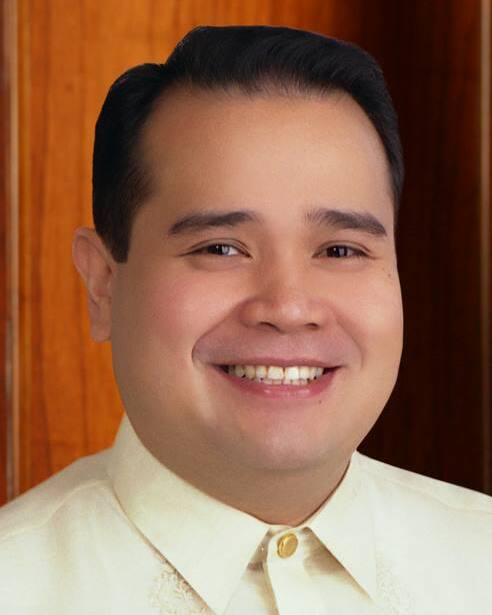

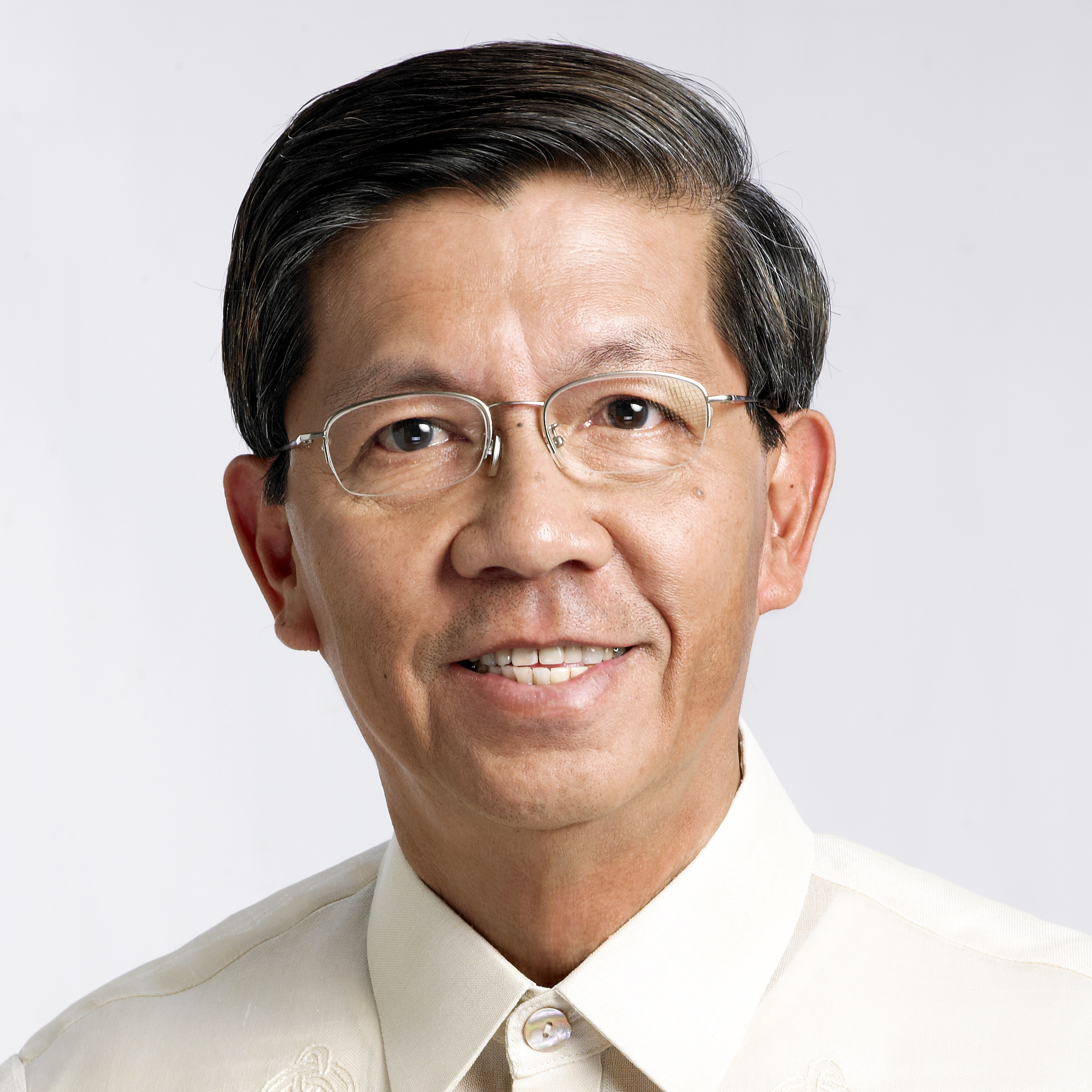
Candidate	Jose Calimlim Jr.	Arturo Lomibao
Party	NPC	Liberal
Popular vote	486,486	223,677
Percentage	67.69%	31.12%
Vice governor before election
Jose Calimlim Jr.
Lakas–Kampi
Elected Vice governor
Jose Calimlim Jr.
NPC

Local elections were held in the province of Pangasinan on May 13, 2013, as part of the 2013 Philippine general election. Pangasinan voters will elect a governor, a vice governor, 6 members of the House of Representatives that will represent the 6 congressional districts of the province, and 12 out of 15 members of the Pangasinan Provincial Board. The officials elected will assume their respective offices on June 30, 2013, for a three-year-long term.

Incumbent Governor Amado Espino Jr., who first won the governorship in 2007, secured a third term by defeating incumbent mayor of Alaminos, Hernani Braganza of the Liberal Party by over 550,000 votes.

== Background ==
Following his 2010 re-election landslide against former governor Victor Agbayani, Governor Amado Espino Jr. consolidated political authority across Pangasinan, building strong local machinery through the Nationalist People's Coalition (NPC) and securing the backing of a majority of the province's 44 municipal mayors.

In September 2012, Alaminos City mayor Hernani Braganza formally declared his gubernatorial candidacy under the ruling Liberal Party (LP) to challenge Espino, setting up a high-stakes campaign supported by the national administration. The contest created a rift within the prominent Ramos-Shahani political family, as Braganza's cousin, Board Member Ranjit Shahani, publicly broke with the local LP leadership to endorse Espino's re-election bid.

== Electoral system ==
Local elections in the Philippines are held every second Monday of May starting in 1992 and every three years thereafter. Single-seat positions such as the governor, vice governor, and House representatives, are elected via first-past-the-post-voting, a voting system where the candidate with the most votes wins, even without a majority. The governor and vice governor are elected by the province at-large, while the House representative and provincial board members are elected per district.

Provincial board elections are done via plurality block voting; Pangsinan is divided into six districts, with each district sending two board members. There are three other ex officio seats: the president of the Philippine Councilors’ League, the president of the Association of Barangay Captains, and the president of the Sangguniang Kabataan (SK) Provincial Federation.

== Campaign ==
=== Party alliances and candidate strategies ===
Ahead of the May 2013 midterm elections, the ruling Liberal Party initially sought to consolidate opposition against incumbent governor Amado Espino Jr. by proposing a ticket that paired Alaminos mayor Hernani Braganza with former governor Victor Agbayani as his vice gubernatorial running mate.

The gubernatorial campaign created a rift within prominent political families in the province. Former president Fidel V. Ramos endorsed his nephew, Hernani Braganza, whereas his sister, former senator Leticia Ramos-Shahani, along with her son, 6th district board member Ranjit Shahani, publicly declared their support for Espino's re-election bid.

=== Defections and local factionalism ===
In April 2013, a coalition of 17 Liberal Party mayoral candidates in Pangasinan, affiliated with a faction led by Board Member Ranjit Shahani, broke rank with the provincial LP leadership to back Amado Espino Jr. for governor. While breaking from the local slate of Hernani Braganza, the group maintained its endorsement of the administration's national Team PNoy senatorial line-up.

== Provincial offices ==
=== Governor ===
Espino, who has been serving as the governor of the province since 2007, was challenged by incumbent mayor of Alaminos, Hernani Braganza.

==== Candidates ====
- Amado Espino Jr. (NPC), incumbent governor since 2007
- Hernani Braganza (Liberal Party), incumbent mayor of Alaminos since 2004

==== Results ====
2013 Pangasinan gubernatorial election
Party	Candidate	Votes	%	±%
NPC	Amado Espino Jr.	851,760	74.12%	+1.21
Liberal	Hernani Braganza	297,409	25.88%	−1.21
Total votes		1,149,169	100.00%	N/A

=== Vice governor ===
Calimlim, who has been serving as the governor of the province since 2010, was challenged by retired chief of the Philippine National Police, Arturo Lomibao.

==== Candidates ====
- Jose Calimlin Jr. (NPC), incumbent vice governor since 2010
- Arturo Lomibao (Liberal Party), retired chief of the Philippine National Police

==== Results ====
2013 Pangasinan vice gubernatorial election
Party	Candidate	Votes	%
NPC	Jose Calimlim Jr.	486,486	67.69
Liberal	Arturo Lomibao	223,677	31.12
Independent	Alvin Bailen	8,538	1.19
Total votes		718,701	100.00

== Provincial board ==
=== Results ===
2013 Pangasinan provincial board election
Party	Votes	Percentage	Seats	Seat change
NPC	684,620	60.94%	9	▲4
Liberal	318,040	28.31%	3	▼1
PMP	43,972	3.91%	0	Steady
Independents	41,975	3.74%	0	Steady
UNA	34,819	3.10%	0	Steady
Totals	1,123,426	100.00%	12	—

==== 1st District ====
2013 Pangasinan's 1st district provincial board election
Party	Candidate	Votes	%
NPC	Napoleon Fontelera Jr.	69,421	42.28%
NPC	Antonio Sison	31,971	19.47%
Liberal	Kay Panabang	23,968	14.60%
Independent	Arturo Padua	18,485	11.26%
Liberal	Bonjing Bacala	16,926	10.31%
Independent	Darwin Braga	3,408	2.08%
Total votes		164,179	100.00%

==== 2nd District ====
2013 Pangasinan's 2nd district provincial board election
Party	Candidate	Votes	%
NPC	Nikiboy Reyes	72,150	32.46%
NPC	Raul Sison	63,901	28.75%
Liberal	Arsenio Merrera	52,132	23.45%
Liberal	Ramchand Caronongan	34,104	15.34%
Total votes		222,287	100.00%

==== 3rd District ====
2013 Pangasinan's 3rd district provincial board election
Party	Candidate	Votes	%
NPC	Angel Baniqued Jr.	73,921	38.70%
Liberal	Generoso Tulagan Jr.	66,022	34.57%
NPC	Leo De Vera	46,875	24.54%
PMP	Ed Gonzales	4,178	2.19%
Total votes		190,996	100.00%

==== 4th District ====
2013 Pangasinan's 4th district provincial board election
Party	Candidate	Votes	%
Liberal	Riby Villegas	37,478	21.66%
NPC	Mojamito Libunao Jr.	35,501	20.52%
UNA	Herminio Romero	34,819	20.12%
Liberal	Gerald Tabadero	33,979	19.64%
NPC	Eleuterio Sison	14,096	8.15%
Independent	Andrei Abalos	13,793	7.97%
Independent	Myrna Torralba	3,380	1.95%
Total votes		173,046	100.00%

==== 5th District ====
2013 Pangasinan's 5th district provincial board election
Party	Candidate	Votes	%
NPC	Danny Uy	101,424	54.17%
NPC	Clemente Arboleda Jr.	85,823	45.83%
Total votes		187,247	100.00%

==== 6th District ====
2013 Pangasinan's 6th district provincial board election
Party	Candidate	Votes	%
Liberal	Ranjit Shahani	53,431	28.78%
NPC	Alfie Bince	47,916	25.81%
NPC	Salvador Perez Jr.	41,621	22.42%
PMP	Jose Peralta Jr.	39,794	21.43%
Independent	Voz Butuyan	2,909	1.57%
Total votes		185,671	100.00%

== House of Representatives ==
2013 Philippine House of Representatives elections in Pangasinan
Party	Votes	Percentage	Seats	Seat change
NPC	748,030	67.98%	5	▲2
Liberal	309,683	28.14%	1	▲1
Nacionalista	27,184	2.47%	0	Steady
Independents	15,466	1.41%	0	Steady
Totals	1,100,363	100.00%	6	—

=== 1st District ===
Jesus Celeste is the incumbent.

==== Candidates ====
- Jesus Celeste (NPC), incumbent representative since 2007
- Leonido Pulido (Liberal Party)

==== Results ====
2013 Philippine House of Representatives election at Pangasinan's 1st district
Party	Candidate	Votes	%
NPC	Jesus Celeste	109,914	57.51
Liberal	Leonildo Pulido	54,949	28.76
Invalid or blank votes		26,242	14.15
Total votes		191,105	100.00
NPC hold			

=== 2nd District ===
Leopoldo Bataoil is the incumbent.

==== Candidates ====
- Leopoldo Bataoil (NPC), incumbent representative since 2010
- Kim Lokin (Liberal Party)

==== Results ====
2013 Philippine House of Representatives special election at Pangasinan's 2nd district
Party	Candidate	Votes	%
NPC	Leopoldo Bataoil	154,466	67.21
Liberal	Kim Lokin	53,394	23.23
Margin of victory		101,072	43.98%
Invalid or blank votes		21,985	9.56
Total votes		229,825	100.00
NPC hold			

=== 3rd District ===
Incumbent Maria Rachel Arenas was running unopposed but backed out; her mother, Rose Marie Arenas is her substitute.

==== Candidates ====
- Rose Marie Arenas (Liberal Party)

==== Results ====
2013 Philippine House of Representatives special election at Pangasinan's 3rd district
Party	Candidate	Votes	%
Liberal	Rose Marie Arenas	201,340	73.96
Invalid or blank votes		70,856	26.04
Total votes		272,196	100.00
Liberal hold			

=== 4th District ===
Gina de Venecia is the incumbent.

==== Candidates ====
- Manay Gina De Venecia (NPC), incumbent representative since 2010
- Celia Lim (Nacionalista)

==== Results ====
2013 Philippine House of Representatives special election at Pangasinan's 4th district
Party	Candidate	Votes	%
NPC	Gina de Venecia	157,784	79.04
Nacionalista	Celia Lim	27,184	13.62
Invalid or blank votes		14,648	7.34
Total votes		199,616	100.00
NPC hold			

=== 5th District ===
Carmen Cojuangco is the incumbent.

==== Candidates ====
- Kimi Cojuangco (NPC), incumbent representative since 2010
- Demetrio Demetria (Independent)

==== Results ====
2013 Philippine House of Representatives special election at Pangasinan's 5th district
Party	Candidate	Votes	%
NPC	Carmen Cojuangco	164,504	75.67
Independent	Demetria Demetrio	15,466	7.11
Invalid or blank votes		37,412	17.22
Total votes		217,382	100.00
NPC hold			

=== 6th District ===
Incumbent Marlyn Primicias-Agabas is running unopposed after her sole opponent, Brigido Gallano (independent), withdrew.

==== Candidates ====
- Marlyn Primicias-Agabas (NPC), incumbent representative since 2010

==== Results ====
2013 Philippine House of Representatives election at Pangasinan's 6th district
Party	Candidate	Votes	%
NPC	Marlyn Primicias-Agabas	161,362	76.00
Invalid or blank votes		50,937	24
Total votes		212,299	100.00
NPC hold			
