= Oscar Orbos =

Filipino politician and actor

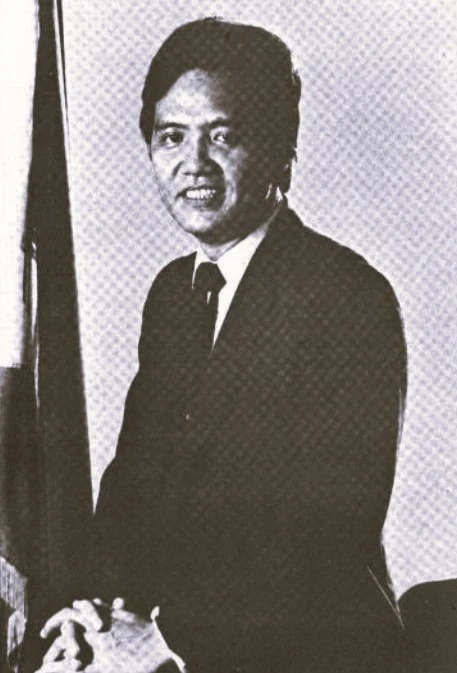
- Orbos official portrait during the 8th Congress.

Chairperson of the People's Television Network
- Incumbent
- Assumed office October 3, 2024
- President: Bongbong Marcos
- Preceded by: Vivian C. Recio

27th Governor of Pangasinan
- In office June 30, 1995 – June 30, 1998
- Vice Governor: Victor Agbayani
- Preceded by: Aguedo Agbayani
- Succeeded by: Victor Agbayani

Member of the Philippine House of Representatives from Pangasinan's First District
- In office June 30, 1987 – January 4, 1990
- Preceded by: Post created
- Succeeded by: Vacant
- In office June 30, 1992 – June 30, 1995
- Preceded by: Vacant
- Succeeded by: Hernani Braganza

24th Executive Secretary of the Philippines
- In office December 16, 1990 – July 14, 1991
- President: Corazon Aquino
- Preceded by: Catalino Macaraig Jr.
- Succeeded by: Franklin Drilon

26th Secretary of Transportation and Communications
- In office January 3, 1990 – December 9, 1990
- President: Corazon Aquino
- Preceded by: Rainiero Reyes
- Succeeded by: Arturo Corona

Personal details
- Born: Oscar Muñoz Orbos; January 28, 1951 (age 75) Bani, Pangasinan, Philippines
- Party: Aksyon (2021–present)
- Other political affiliations: Lakas ng Bansa (until 1988); LDP (1988–1992); Independent (1992–1998); Reporma (1998–2021)
- Education: University of the Philippines Diliman (BA, LL.B)

Oscar Muñoz Orbos (born January 28, 1951), popularly known as Ka Oca, is a Philippine TV personality and host of GMA Network's Debate with Mare at Pare, currently serving as the chairperson of the People's Television Network since 2024, under President Bongbong Marcos.

Orbos was a former cabinet secretary, provincial governor, and vice presidential candidate. He is now a practicing lawyer and broadcaster.

== Early life ==
Born in Bani, Pangasinan, he completed his studies at the University of the Philippines Diliman with a Bachelor of Arts in Economics in 1971. He enrolled in the University of the Philippines College of Law and received his Bachelor of Laws in 1975.

While in the University, he became a member of the Alpha Phi Beta Fraternity and eventually headed it as its Lord Chancellor.

== Private career ==
He became a legal assistant to the Paredes, Poblador, Nazareno, Azada and Tomacruz Law Firm from 1975 to 1976 and elevated to Associate Attorney in 1976. He became a Partner in 1980 and the firm was called the Poblador, Azada, Tomacruz, Paredes, Cacanindin and Orbos Law Firm. He resigned to the post in 1983 to help in the propaganda campaign to oust Ferdinand Marcos.

== Politics ==
In 1987, Orbos ran and won as congressman and represented the first district of Pangasinan from November 1987 to December 1989. He was cited as one of the most active congressmen in the 8th Philippine Congress. He was cited as one of the 1989 Ten Outstanding Young Men (TOYM) for Public Service and legislation.

On January 4, 1990, President Corazon Aquino appointed him as secretary of the Department of Transportation and Communications. As secretary, one of the most notable contributions was the yellow lane, where the two outermost lanes of 4-6 lane roads were allotted for public utility vehicles, mostly buses. He also facilitated the approval of cellular broadcast. This made it possible for companies to offer a new form of communication more popularly known as "cellular phones".

On December 21, 1990, Orbos was appointed by Aquino as her executive secretary. During that time, Iraq already occupied Kuwait and it had plans to make further attacks on Saudi Arabia. Orbos facilitated measures for the repatriation and communication to overseas Filipino workers working in the Middle East.

He resigned on July 5, 1991 and returned to private life. He co-hosted GMA Network's Firing Line, a TV panel talk show with Teodoro Benigno, Mrs. Aquino's former press secretary. During the 1992 elections, he actively supported fellow Pangasinense Fidel Ramos to the presidency and successfully won again as representative of the first district of Pangasinan. He served once more in the Congress until 1995.

In 1995, he resigned as host of the TV program and ran for the position of Governor of Pangasinan. He won the election via landslide. As governor, he initiated the establishment of a Provincial Action Center to provide public direct access to all provincial and national government offices to respond to needs of his constituency. Orbos gained the highest public approval rating as governor.

Orbos served as the governor of Pangasinan for only one term until 1998. He chose not to seek reelection to instead run for the position of Vice President in 1998 as a running mate of Renato de Villa under Reporma. However, he lost to Senator Gloria Macapagal Arroyo.

Orbos sought a political comeback in 2022, running for representative of Pangasinan's 1st district under Aksyon Demokratiko. He supported the presidential bid of Isko Moreno and later of Vice President Leni Robredo. However, he lost to former Alaminos Mayor Arthur Celeste.

In 2024, President Bongbong Marcos appointed him as the acting chairperson and member of the Board of Directors of the People's Television Network, Inc. (PTNI).

== Debate host ==
In late 1998, Orbos was offered by Menardo Jimenez, president of GMA Network to host an open debate program for TV. As a friend of Jimenez, he accepted the offer and was paired with Economics professor Solita Monsod, known as "Mareng Winnie". Debate with Mare at Pare became a prominent interactive and open talk show in the Philippines.

== Private life ==
His brother, Fr. Agerico "Jerry" Orbos, SVD, is a popular Catholic priest. His other brother, Thomas "Tim" Orbos served as the acting chairman and General Manager of the Metropolitan Manila Development Authority.

Professor Solita Monsod, his co-host in Debate with Mare at Pare, also served as his godmother during his wedding.

== Awards and nominations ==
Year	Award giving body	Category	Nominated work	Results
2000	PMPC Star Awards for Television	Best Public Affairs Program Host(shared with Solita Monsod)	Debate with Mare & Pare	Won
