= 2016 Pangasinan local elections =

- May 9, 2016
- Registered: 1,705,260
- Turnout: 85.11% (▲3.69 pp)
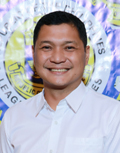

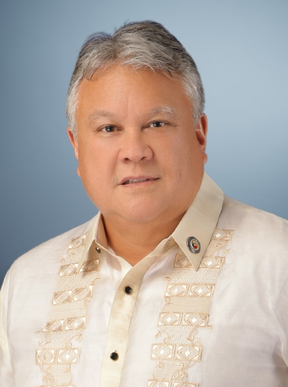
Nominee	Amado Espino III	Mark Cojuangco
Party	Aksyon	NPC
Running mate	Jose Calimlim Jr.	Mark Macanlalay
Popular vote	720,820	503,247
Percentage	58.57%	40.89%

Espino 50–60% 60–70% 70–80%	Cojuanco 50–60% 60–70% 70–80%	N/A
Governor before election
Amado Espino Jr.
Nationalist People's Coalition/Biskeg
Elected Governor
Amado Espino III
Aksyon
- Vice gubernatorial elections
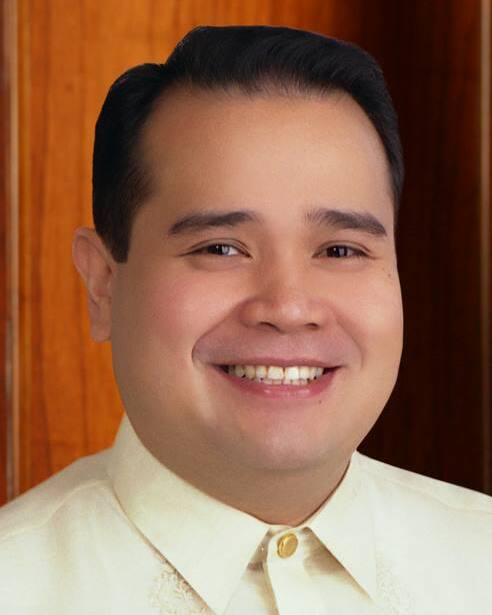

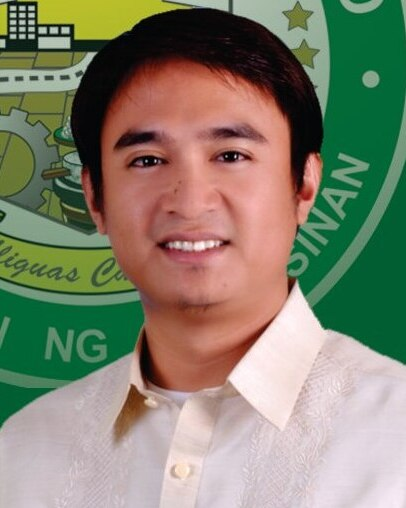
Nominee	Jose Calimlim Jr.	Mark Macanlalay
Party	Aksyon	NPC
Popular vote	554,584	551,680
Percentage	49.32%	49.07%

Calimlim 40–50% 50–60% 60–70% 70–80% 80–90%	Macanlalay 40–50% 50–60% 60–70%	N/A
Vice Governor before election
Jose Calimlim Jr.
Nationalist People's Coalition/Biskeg
Elected Vice Governor
Jose Calimlim Jr.
Aksyon

Local elections were held in the province of Pangasinan on May 9, 2016 as part of the 2016 Philippine general election. Pangasinan voters will elect a governor, a vice governor, 6 members of the House of Representatives that will represent the 6 congressional districts of the province, and 12 out of 15 members of the Pangasinan Provincial Board. The officials elected will assume their respective offices on June 30, 2016, for a three-year-long term.

== Electoral system ==
Local elections in the Philippines are held every second Monday of May starting in 1992 and every three years thereafter. Single-seat positions (governor, vice governor, and House representative) are elected via first-past-the-post-voting. The governor and vice governor are elected by the province at-large, while the House representative and provincial board members are elected per district.

provincial board elections are done via plurality block voting; Pangsinan is divided into six districts, with each district sending two board members. There are three other ex officio seats, the president of the Philippine Councilors’ League, the president of the Association of Barangay Captains, and the president of the Sangguniang Kabataan (SK) Provincial Federation; these will be determined later in the year at the barangay and Sangguniang Kabataan elections.

== Governor ==
=== Candidates ===
- Mark Cojuangco (NPC), Former representative from Pangasinan's 5th district (2001-2010)
- Amado Espino III (Aksyon), Provincial Board Member (2013–2016)
- Zaldy Salvador (Independent)

=== Results ===
Candidate	Party	Votes	%
Amado Espino III	Aksyon	720,820	58.57
Mark Cojuangco	NPC	503,247	40.89
Zaldy Salvador	Independent	6,664	0.54
Total		1,230,731	100.00
Registered voters/turnout		1,705,260	–
Aksyon gain from NPC			

Note - Partial and Unofficial Results as of 7:45 PM, May 18, 2016 representing 97.71% of the REGION I, PANGASINAN Election Returns. (2,777 of 2,842 Election Returns) (1,421,948 of 1,705,260 Registered Voters). Source: COMELEC-GMA Mirror Server.

=== Per City/Municipality ===
City/Municipality	Amado I. Espino III		Mark Cojuangco		Zaldy Salvador	
City/Municipality	Votes	%	Votes	%	Votes	%
Agno	6,035	48.39	6,368	51.06	69	0.55
Aguilar	8,875	46.75	9,975	52.55	132	0.70
Alaminos	16,757	45.22	20,117	54.29	179	0.48
Alcala	10,882	56.99	8,141	42.64	70	0.37
Anda	8,682	49.42	8,797	50.07	90	0.51
Asingan	17,104	61.96	10,386	37.63	113	0.41
Balungao	6,517	50.01	6,473	49.67	41	0.31
Bani	10,392	48.30	11,034	51.28	91	0.42
Basista	10,705	68.12	4,959	31.55	52	0.33
Bautista	10,639	72.09	4,097	27.76	21	0.14
Bayambang	24,873	49.00	25,578	50.39	310	0.61
Binalonan	15,315	62.03	9,258	37.50	115	0.47
Binmaley	33,462	76.32	10,070	22.97	312	0.71
Bolinao	8,396	29.08	20,288	70.27	189	0.65
Bugallon	20,373	63.05	11,776	36.44	165	0.51
Burgos	4,492	52.81	3,970	46.67	44	0.52
Calasiao	27,286	61.90	16,640	37.75	154	0.35
Dasol	8,059	52.98	7,050	46.35	102	0.67
Infanta	5,272	46.29	6,054	53.16	63	0.55
Labrador	6,576	51.16	6,232	48.49	45	0.35
Laoac	7,941	54.29	6,644	45.42	42	0.29
Lingayen	27,128	58.79	18,821	40.79	197	0.43
Mabini	6,324	55.02	5,128	44.61	42	0.37
Malasiqui	38,320	69.96	16,150	29.48	305	0.56
Manaoag	21,743	67.36	10,362	32.10	175	0.54
Mangaldan	27,179	59.22	18,284	39.84	430	0.94
Mangatarem	11,904	61.38	7,410	38.21	81	0.42
Mapandan	11,776	73.52	4,163	25.99	78	0.49
Natividad	8,012	67.59	3,782	31.91	59	0.50
Pozorrubio	18,144	55.98	14,108	43.53	158	0.49
Rosales	14,914	47.82	16,121	51.68	156	0.50
San Carlos	54,514	71.38	21,473	28.12	386	0.51
San Fabian	19,892	56.44	15,042	42.68	310	0.88
San Jacinto	11,721	62.50	6,885	36.71	149	0.79
San Manuel	7,247	35.26	13,115	63.81	190	0.92
San Nicolas	9,597	51.69	8,833	47.58	136	0.73
San Quintin	9,303	57.36	6,781	41.81	135	0.83
Santa Barbara	21,557	60.16	14,092	39.33	182	0.51
Santa Maria	8,009	52.59	7,166	47.06	53	0.35
Santo Tomas	2,570	43.26	3,359	56.54	12	0.20
Sison	9,459	44.42	11,768	55.27	66	0.31
Sual	6,968	39.62	10,527	59.86	92	0.52
Tayug	11,073	54.91	8,987	44.57	105	0.52
Umingan	22,636	65.95	11,435	33.31	253	0.74
Urbiztondo	17,744	72.56	6,612	27.04	97	0.40
Urdaneta	33,227	61.53	20,465	37.90	307	0.57
Villasis	21,226	71.21	8,471	28.42	111	0.37
TOTAL	720,820	58.57	503,247	40.89	6,664	0.54

=== Per Legislative District ===
City/Municipality	Amado I. Espino III		Mark Cojuangco		Zaldy Salvador	
City/Municipality	Votes	%	Votes	%	Votes	%
1st	81,377	44.79	99,333	54.68	961	0.53
2nd	136,767	64.00	75,855	35.50	1,081	0.51
3rd	178,326	64.18	98,096	35.31	1,415	0.51
4th	80,535	60.93	50,573	38.26	1,064	0.81
5th	129,403	59.74	86,311	39.85	902	0.42
6th	114,412	54.81	93,079	44.59	1,241	0.59

== Vice Governor ==
Jose Ferdinand “Ferdie” Calimlim Jr. narrowly defeated his rival Mark Roy Macanlalay, winning by a margin of 2,904 votes. His proclamation was confirmed shortly after the election.

=== Candidates ===
- Jose Calimlim Jr. (Aksyon), Vice Governor of Pangasinan (2010-2013), Mayor of Mapandan (2001-2010)
- Mark Macanlalay (NPC), Mayor of Calasiao (2010-2016)
- Myrna Torralba (Independent)

Candidate	Party	Votes	%
Jose Calimlim Jr. (incumbent)	Aksyon	554,584	49.32
Mark Macanlalay	NPC	551,680	49.07
Myrna Torralba	Independent	18,110	1.61
Total		1,124,374	100.00
Registered voters/turnout		1,705,260	–
Aksyon hold			

Note - Partial and Unofficial Results as of 7:45 PM, May 18, 2016 representing 97.71% of the REGION I, PANGASINAN Election Returns. (2,777 of 2,842 Election Returns) (1,421,948 of 1,705,260 Registered Voters). Source: COMELEC-GMA Mirror Server.

=== Per City/Municipality ===
City/Municipality	Jose Calimlim Jr.		Mark Macanlalay		Myrna Torralba	
City/Municipality	Votes	%	Votes	%	Votes	%
Agno	5,948	53.89	4,945	44.80	145	1.31
Aguilar	7,909	45.49	9,286	53.41	192	1.10
Alaminos	15,991	46.78	17,782	52.02	407	1.19
Alcala	8,496	50.85	7,981	47.77	230	1.38
Anda	7,075	45.05	8,343	53.12	287	1.83
Asingan	13,126	53.14	11,151	45.14	426	1.72
Balungao	4,980	42.20	6,685	56.65	135	1.14
Bani	10,064	51.09	9,417	47.81	217	1.10
Basista	8,083	56.84	5,974	42.01	163	1.15
Bautista	9,018	67.87	4,176	31.43	93	0.70
Bayambang	17,786	36.98	29,635	61.61	677	1.41
Binalonan	12,365	57.82	8,465	39.58	557	2.60
Binmaley	18,721	46.46	21,011	52.15	559	1.39
Bolinao	9,938	37.21	16,302	61.04	469	1.76
Bugallon	15,186	51.53	13,989	47.47	296	1.00
Burgos	3,285	43.41	4,184	55.29	99	1.31
Calasiao	14,629	33.54	28,700	65.79	294	0.67
Dasol	6,144	45.79	7,085	52.81	188	1.40
Infanta	4,631	45.22	5,443	53.14	168	1.64
Labrador	5,471	46.90	6,092	52.22	102	0.87
Laoac	6,367	48.85	5,956	45.70	710	5.45
Lingayen	21,602	50.67	20,486	48.05	547	1.28
Mabini	5,951	56.40	4,495	42.60	106	1.00
Malasiqui	22,098	43.17	28,290	55.26	802	1.57
Manaoag	17,433	58.71	11,669	39.30	592	1.99
Mangaldan	20,709	48.12	21,314	49.53	1,011	2.35
Mangatarem	10,051	57.69	7,073	40.60	299	1.72
Mapandan	15,291	94.14	871	5.36	80	0.49
Natividad	6,191	61.16	3,731	36.86	201	1.99
Pozorrubio	14,927	52.66	12,896	45.50	521	1.84
Rosales	13,705	48.45	14,128	49.94	455	1.61
San Carlos	34,302	47.83	36,409	50.77	1,001	1.40
San Fabian	16,313	50.16	15,120	46.50	1,086	3.34
San Jacinto	9,099	53.57	7,370	43.39	515	3.03
San Manuel	7,280	39.30	10,965	59.20	277	1.50
San Nicolas	7,011	41.77	9,577	57.05	198	1.18
San Quintin	7,502	51.28	6,946	47.48	181	1.24
Santa Barbara	13,947	40.99	19,642	57.73	437	1.28
Santa Maria	6,630	48.80	6,804	50.08	151	1.11
Santo Tomas	4,763	88.32	603	11.18	27	0.50
Sison	8,497	45.47	9,921	53.08	271	1.45
Sual	5,442	34.76	10,028	64.05	186	1.19
Tayug	9,294	52.32	8,276	46.59	194	1.09
Umingan	15,430	50.95	14,083	46.50	771	2.55
Urbiztondo	13,119	60.29	8,190	37.64	450	2.07
Urdaneta	26,655	55.27	20,612	42.74	963	2.00
Villasis	16,129	61.84	9,579	36.73	374	1.43
TOTAL	554,584	49.32	551,680	49.07	18,110	1.61

=== Per Legislative District ===
City/Municipality	Jose Calimlim Jr.		Mark Macanlalay		Myrna Torralba	
City/Municipality	Votes	%	Votes	%	Votes	%
1st	74,469	45.20	88,024	53.42	2,272	1.38
2nd	100,142	51.39	92,101	47.27	2,608	1.34
3rd	118,053	45.20	143,547	54.19	3,291	1.24
4th	63,554	51.99	55,473	45.38	3,204	2.62
5th	107,217	56.09	80,189	41.95	3,746	1.96
6th	91,149	48.88	92,346	49.52	2,989	1.60

== Provincial Board ==
The Pangasinan Provincial Board is composed of 15 board members, 12 of whom are elected.

=== Results ===
Party	Votes	%	Seats
Nationalist People's Coalition	808,408	46.57	5
Liberal Party	586,875	33.81	5
Kilusang Bagong Lipunan	119,517	6.88	1
Aksyon Demokratiko	99,352	5.72	1
Lakas–CMD	71,322	4.11	0
Independent	42,966	2.48	0
Pwersa ng Masang Pilipino	7,553	0.44	0
Ex officio seats			3
Total	1,735,993	100.00	15

=== First district ===
Pangasinan's 1st provincial district consists of the same area as Pangasinan's 1st legislative district. Two board members are elected from this provincial district.

==== Results ====
Candidate	Party	Votes	%
Napoleon Fontelera Jr. (incumbent)	Nationalist People's Coalition	120,900	50.31
Antonio Sison (incumbent)	Nationalist People's Coalition	60,794	25.30
Teofilo Humilde Jr.	Liberal Party	54,031	22.49
Loreto Obice	Independent	4,572	1.90
Total		240,297	100.00

=== 2nd provincial district ===
Pangasinan's 2nd provincial district consists of the same area as Pangasinan's 2nd legislative district. Two board members are elected from this provincial district.

==== Results ====
Candidate	Party	Votes	%
Raul Sison (incumbent)	Aksyon	99,352	32.19
Nikiboy Reyes (incumbent)	Liberal Party	83,526	27.06
Von Mark Mendoza	Nationalist People's Coalition	78,518	25.44
Butch Merrera	Liberal Party	47,268	15.31
Total		308,664	100.00

=== 3rd provincial district ===
Pangasinan's 3rd provincial district consists of the same area as Pangasinan's 3rd legislative district. Two board members are elected from this provincial district.

==== Results ====
Candidate	Party	Votes	%
Angel Baniqued Jr. (incumbent)	Liberal Party	136,632	36.23
Generoso Tulagan Jr. (incumbent)	Kilusang Bagong Lipunan	119,517	31.69
Vici Ventanilla	Nationalist People's Coalition	110,961	29.43
Eduardo Gonzales	Independent	9,976	2.65
Total		377,086	100.00

=== 4th provincial district ===
Pangasinan's 4th provincial district consists of the same area as Pangasinan's 4th legislative district, excluding the city of Dagupan. Two board members are elected from this provincial district.

==== Results ====
Candidate	Party	Votes	%
Jeremy Agerico Rosario (incumbent)	Liberal Party	51,470	24.08
Liberato Villegas (incumbent)	Liberal Party	50,682	23.71
Gerald Tabadero	Nationalist People's Coalition	40,973	19.17
Berex Abalos	Nationalist People's Coalition	34,665	16.22
Juvy Frialde	Independent	28,418	13.29
Godfrey Carbonel	Pwersa ng Masang Pilipino	7,553	3.53
Total		213,761	100.00

=== 5th provincial district ===
Pangasinan's 5th provincial district consists of the same area as Pangasinan's 5th legislative district. Two board members are elected from this provincial district.

==== Results ====
Candidate	Party	Votes	%
Chinky Perez	Nationalist People's Coalition	104,732	35.67
Clemente Abordela Jr. (incumbent)	Nationalist People's Coalition	103,639	35.29
Dennis Uy	Liberal Party	85,282	29.04
Total		293,653	100.00

=== 6th provincial district ===
Pangasinan's 6th provincial district consists of the same area as Pangasinan's 6th legislative district. Two board members are elected from this provincial district.

==== Results ====
Candidate	Party	Votes	%
Salvador Perez Jr.	Nationalist People's Coalition	78,645	26.00
Noel Bince	Liberal Party	77,984	25.78
Jose Peralta Jr.	Nationalist People's Coalition	74,581	24.65
Ranjit Shahani (incumbent)	Lakas-CMD	71,322	23.58
Total		302,532	100.00

== House of Representatives elections ==
=== First District ===
Incumbent representative Jesus Celeste runs for a 3rd term as congressman.

==== Results ====
Candidate	Party	Votes	%
Jesus Celeste (incumbent)	NPC	147,273	87.03
Wilmer Panabang	Liberal Party	18,799	11.11
Paul Tucay	KBL	3,140	1.86
Total		169,212	100.00
Valid votes		169,212	83.08
Invalid/blank votes		34,468	16.92
Total votes		203,680	100.00

==== Results per city/municipality ====
City/municipality	Jesus Celeste		Wilmer Panabang		Paul Tucay	
City/municipality	Votes	%	Votes	%	Votes	%
Agno	10,662	93.38	602	5.27	154	1.35
Alaminos City	26,289	74.33	8,612	24.35	467	1.32
Anda	14,984	91.87	1,010	6.19	316	1.94
Bani	17,738	87.38	2,286	11.26	277	1.36
Bolinao	28,177	95.05	321	1.08	1,147	3.87
Burgos	6,564	85.11	914	11.85	234	3.03
Dasol	13,615	96.25	362	2.56	168	1.19
Infanta	8,142	86.47	1,178	12.51	96	1.02
Mabini	8,175	79.39	2,022	19.64	100	0.97
Sual	12,927	88.54	1,492	10.22	181	1.24
Total	147,273	87.03	18,799	11.11	3,140	1.86

First District Results

Vote %

0–10%
10–20%
20–30%
70–80%
80–90%
90–100%

=== Second District ===
Leopoldo Bataoil runs for a 3rd term as congressman.

==== Results ====
Candidate	Party	Votes	%
Leopoldo Bataoil (incumbent)	Liberal Party	172,078	100.00
Total		172,078	100.00
Valid votes		172,078	69.96
Invalid/blank votes		73,882	30.04
Total votes		245,960	100.00

==== Results per city/municipality ====
City/municipality	Leopoldo Bataoil	
City/municipality	Votes	%
Aguilar (Note: Partial and unofficial results as of 7:45 p.m., May 18, 2016, representing 97.44% of the election returns in Region I — Pangasinan, Aguilar (38 of 39 election returns), covering 20,006 of 23,781 registered voters. Source: COMELEC–GMA Mirror Server.)	14,756	100.00
Basista	11,760	100.00
Binmaley	33,134	100.00
Bugallon	22,657	100.00
Labrador	9,954	100.00
Lingayen	33,311	100.00
Mangatarem (Note: Partial and Unofficial Results as of 7:45 PM, May 18, 2016 representing 54.84% of the REGION I, PANGASINAN, MANGATAREM Election Returns. (51 of 93 Election Returns) (20,669 of 44,564 Registered Voters). Source: COMELEC-GMA Mirror Server.)	15,530	100.00
Urbiztondo	17,140	100.00
Total	172,078	100.00

Second District Results

Vote %

90–100%

=== Third District ===
Incumbent congresswoman Rose Marie Arenas runs for a 2nd term.

==== Results ====
Candidate	Party	Votes	%
Rose Marie Arenas (incumbent)	Liberal Party	192,831	71.66
Generoso Tulagan Sr.	KBL	53,844	20.01
Eric Acuña	PDP-Laban	22,404	8.33
Total		269,079	100.00
Valid votes		269,079	89.61
Invalid/blank votes		31,183	10.39
Total votes		300,262	100.00

==== Results per city/municipality ====
City/municipality	Rose Marie Arenas		Generoso Tulagan Sr.		Eric Acuña	
City/municipality	Votes	%	Votes	%	Votes	%
Bayambang	37,690	77.16	7,408	15.17	3,747	7.67
Calasiao	28,498	67.41	8,568	20.27	5,209	12.32
San Carlos City	51,886	70.20	18,815	25.45	3,215	4.35
Malasiqui	43,598	81.10	6,549	12.18	3,609	6.71
Mapandan	8,815	56.24	4,835	30.85	2,023	12.91
Santa Barbara	22,344	64.55	7,669	22.16	4,601	13.29
Total	192,831	71.66	53,844	20.01	22,404	8.33

Third District Results

Vote %

0–10%
10–20%
20–30%
30–40%
50–60%
60–70%
70–80%
80–90%

=== Fourth District ===
Incumbent congresswoman Gina de Venecia doesn't run for a 2nd term as congresswoman, her son Christopher de Venecia runs to replace her.

==== Results ====
Candidate	Party	Votes	%
Christopher de Venecia	Liberal Party	172,089	91.72
Angel Aquino	Independent	6,525	3.48
Arvin De Guzman	Independent	4,829	2.57
Mario Operaña	Independent	2,293	1.22
Ronaldo Ebreo	Independent	1,897	1.01
Total		187,633	100.00
Valid votes		187,633	81.36
Invalid/blank votes		42,978	18.64
Total votes		230,611	100.00

==== Results per city/municipality ====
City/municipality	Christopher de Venecia		Angel Aquino		Arvin De Guzman		Mario Operaña		Ronaldo Ebreo	
City/municipality	Votes	%	Votes	%	Votes	%	Votes	%	Votes	%
Dagupan City	57,724	87.88	3,886	5.92	1,729	2.63	1,489	2.27	857	1.30
Manaoag	27,671	93.95	661	2.24	663	2.25	246	0.84	211	0.72
Mangaldan	40,146	94.10	974	2.28	919	2.15	304	0.71	322	0.75
San Fabian	30,149	93.29	700	2.17	927	2.87	374	1.16	166	0.51
San Jacinto	16,399	93.55	304	1.73	605	3.45	88	0.50	133	0.76
Total	172,089	91.72	6,525	3.48	4,829	2.57	2,293	1.22	1,897	1.01

Fourth District Results

Vote %

0–10%
10–20%
20–30%
60–70%
70–80%
80–90%

=== Fifth District ===
Incumbent congresswoman Carmen "Kimi" Cojuangco is defeated by Former Governor of Pangasinan, Amado Espino Jr. by 40,438 votes.

==== Results ====
Candidate	Party	Votes	%
Amado Espino Jr.	Aksyon	133,381	58.93
Carmen Cojuangco	NPC	92,943	41.07
Total		226,324	100.00
Valid votes		226,324	93.49
Invalid/blank votes		15,769	6.51
Total votes		242,093	100.00

==== Results per city/municipality ====
City/municipality	Amado Espino Jr.		Carmen Cojuangco	
City/municipality	Votes	%	Votes	%
Alcala (Note: Partial and Unofficial Results as of 7:45 PM, May 18, 2016 representing 93.02% of the REGION I, PANGASINAN, ALCALA Election Returns. (40 of 43 Election Returns) (20,607 of 25,655 Registered Voters). Source: COMELEC-GMA Mirror Server.)	10,622	55.08	8,664	44.92
Bautista	10,673	72.25	4,100	27.75
Binalonan	14,918	58.98	10,375	41.02
Laoac	7,715	51.99	7,123	48.01
Pozorrubio (Note: Partial and Unofficial Results as of 7:45 PM, May 18, 2016 representing 98.53% of the REGION I, PANGASINAN, POZORRUBIO Election Returns. (67 of 68 Election Returns) (35,308 of 41,515 Registered Voters). Source: COMELEC-GMA Mirror Server.)	17,925	54.51	14,958	45.49
Santo Tomas	2,726	45.65	3,245	54.35
Sison	9,514	44.38	11,926	55.63
Urdaneta City (Note: Partial and Unofficial Results as of 7:45 PM, May 18, 2016 representing 90.91% of the REGION I, PANGASINAN, URDANETA CITY Election Returns. (110 of 121 Election Returns) (58,995 of 76,296 Registered Voters). Source: COMELEC-GMA Mirror Server.)	33,763	61.68	20,972	38.32
Villasis	21,230	70.60	8,841	29.40
Total	133,381	58.93	92,943	41.07

Fifth District Results

Vote %

20–30%
30–40%
40–50%
50–60%
60–70%
70–80%

=== Sixth District ===
Marlyn Primicias-Agabas runs for a 3rd term as congresswoman.

==== Results ====
Candidate	Party	Votes	%
Marlyn Primicias-Agabas (incumbent)	NPC	183,175	100.00
Total		183,175	100.00
Valid votes		183,175	80.05
Invalid/blank votes		45,643	19.95
Total votes		228,818	100.00

==== Results per city/municipality ====
City/municipality	Marlyn Primicias-Agabas	
City/municipality	Votes	%
Asingan	22,689	100.00
Balungao (Note: Partial and Unofficial Results as of 7:45 PM, May 18, 2016 representing 90.91% of the REGION I, PANGASINAN, BALUNGAO Election Returns. (30 of 33 Election Returns) (14,145 of 17,999 Registered Voters). Source: COMELEC-GMA Mirror Server.)	11,830	100.00
Natividad	11,038	100.00
Rosales	26,458	100.00
San Manuel	17,151	100.00
San Nicolas	17,278	100.00
San Quintin	14,482	100.00
Santa Maria	12,689	100.00
Tayug	17,801	100.00
Umingan (Note: Partial and Unofficial Results as of 7:45 PM, May 18, 2016 representing 98.72% of the REGION I, PANGASINAN, UMINGAN Election Returns. (77 of 78 Election Returns) (38,177 of 43,793 Registered Voters). Source: COMELEC-GMA Mirror Server.)	30,391	100.00
Total	183,175	100.00

Sixth District Results

Vote %

90–100%
