= Aguedo Agbayani =

Filipino lawyer and politician (1919–2003)

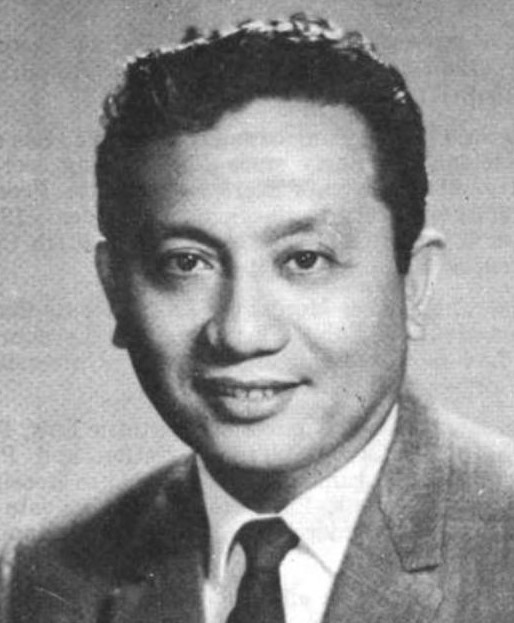
- Agbayani's official portrait during the 6th Congress

Member of the Philippine House of Representatives from Pangasinan's 1st district
- In office December 30, 1957 – December 30, 1971
- Preceded by: Mario Bengzon
- Succeeded by: District abolished (seat later held by Oscar Orbos in 1987)

20th and 26th Governor of Pangasinan
- In office June 30, 1992 – June 30, 1995
- Vice Governor: Ranjit Ramos Shahani
- Preceded by: Rafael Colet
- Succeeded by: Oscar Orbos
- In office June 17, 1978 – March 1986
- Preceded by: Agerico Rosario (OIC)
- Succeeded by: Demetrio Demetria
- In office December 30, 1971 – January 2, 1976
- Preceded by: Vicente Millora
- Succeeded by: Agerico Rosario (OIC)

Personal details
- Born: December 16, 1919 Lingayen, Pangasinan, Philippine Islands
- Died: October 23, 2003 (aged 83) Quezon City, Philippines
- Party: Lakas (1991–2003)
- Other political affiliations: KBL (1978–1991); UPP (1987–1991); Nacionalista (1957–1978)
- Spouse: Teresita Elizaga
- Children: 6, including Victor
- Education: University of the Philippines (LLB)

Aguedo Ferrer Agbayani (December 16, 1919 – October 23, 2003) was a Filipino lawyer and politician who served as the representative for Pangasinan's 1st congressional district in the Philippine House of Representatives from 1957 until 1971. He later served as governor of Pangasinan from 1971 to 1976, from 1978 to 1986, and from 1992 to 1995.

== Early life and education ==
Aguedo Ferrer Agbayani was born on December 16, 1919, in Barrio Pangapisan, Lingayen, Pangasinan, as the eldest of six children of Donato Agbayani of Ilocos Norte and Perpetua Ferrer of Lingayen. During his grade school years, he worked as a shoeshiner and newspaper boy. He graduated as valedictorian of his primary and intermediate classes at Lingayen Elementary School in 1930 and 1933, respectively. He later graduated as valedictorian of the 1937 class of Pangasinan Academic High School and as salutatorian of the 1947 class of the University of the Philippines (UP) College of Law, where he graduated cum laude. He placed fourth in the 1948 bar examinations.

During his college years, Agbayani served as captain of the undefeated UP debating team, lord chancellor of the Alpha Phi Beta Law Fraternity, city editor of the Philippine Collegian, and editor-in-chief of the Philippinensian, the university's annual publication. He was also a member and officer of several organizations, including the Phi Kappa Phi international honor society, the UP Law Council, and the editorial board of the Philippine Law Journal.

== Early career ==
Agbayani began practicing law in Pangasinan and Manila, and has served as legal counsel of the Nacionalista Party from 1949, and as the party's acting secretary general in 1951. He also served as private secretary to Senate President Eulogio Rodriguez.

== House of Representatives (1957–1971) ==
Agbayani was elected thrice to the House of Representatives, representing Pangasinan's 1st congressional district in 1957, 1961, 1965, and 1969. He served in the 4th, 5th, 6th, and 7th Congresses, respectively.

As a congressman, Agbayani was a member of the House Electoral Tribunal and of committees on ways and means, banks, currency and corporations, revision of laws, judiciary and national defense. He was also vice chairman of the committee on codification of law and statistics, and chairman of the special committee on import restrictions and alternate member othe National Economic Council. He opposed increased taxation, which compelled the Macapagal administration to postpone its plan to impose higher taxes. He also opposed the Emergency Employment Administration's (EEA) proposed daily wage rate of ₱2, compelling the agency to pay its laborers ₱4 per day.

== Governor of Pangasinan (1971–1976; 1978–1986; 1992–1995) ==
Agbayani was elected governor of Pangasinan in 1971 and served until 1976. He was re-elected in 1978, serving until March 1986, and again in 1992, serving a third term until 1995.

== Personal life ==
Agbayani was married to Teresita Elizaga, with whom he had six children, including Victor, who served as an assemblyman, representative, and governor of Pangasinan.

As a law professor, he taught mercantile law, private corporations, insurance, transportation and public service law at the Lyceum of the Philippines and Philippine Law School, and commercial law at the University of the East. He also served as a bar reviewer for law candidates.

He authored several law textbooks, including:

- Mercantile Law
- Philippine Law on Insurance
- Philippine Law on Transportation and Public Service
- Handbook on Negotiable Instruments and Warehouse Receipts Law
- Mercantile Law Reviewer
- Partnerships and Private Corporations
- CPA Law Reviewer; and
- Commercial Laws of the Philippines

As an economist, Agbayani served as adviser to the Philippine delegation to the 1958 annual meetings of the International Monetary Fund, the International Bank for Reconstruction and Development, and the International Finance Corporation in New Delhi, India.

Agbayani died on October 23, 2003.

House of Representatives of the Philippines
Preceded by Mario Bengzon	Member of the Philippine House of Representatives for Pangasinan's 1st district 1957–1971	Vacant Martial law and adoption of the 1973 Constitution Title next held by Oscar Orbos
Political offices
Preceded by Rafael Colet	Governor of Pangasinan; 1992–1995	Succeeded by Oscar Orbos
Preceded by Agerico Rosario (OIC)	Governor of Pangasinan; 1978–1986	Succeeded by Demetrio Demetria
Preceded by Vicente Millora	Governor of Pangasinan; 1971–1976	Succeeded by Agerico Rosario (OIC)
