= Aksyon Dapat =

Multi-sectoral organization of Aksyon Demokratiko

- — Philippine partylist —
- President: Hernani Braganza
- Type: Sectoral organization
- Sector(s) represented: Multi-sector
- Ideology: Consultative democracy
- Political position: Centre
- National affiliation: Aksyon

Aksyon Dapat (lit. 'Must Act'), is a political organization seeking party-list representation in the House of Representatives of the Philippines.

== History ==
Aksyon Dapat is formed by Robbie Pierre "Bobbit" Roco, former Aksyon Demokratiko President and son of its founder Raul Roco.

In October 8, 2024, Aksyon Dapat filed Certificate of Candidacies to run for party-list elections in 2025. Its first nominee was former Agrarian Reform secretary Hernandi Braganza, with Bobbit Roco as second.

Aksyon Dapat engaged in consultations in some provinces such as Cebu.

Aksyon Dapat lost the election, placing 123rd.

== Sector Represented ==
Aksyon Dapat platforms focus on livelihood, health, education, environment, housing, and peace and order. Also, Braganza added in the party's platform the rights of local government units to have additional funding for their development. The party also represents the ones in the poverty line.

== Electoral results ==
Election	Votes	%	Secured Seats	Party-List Seats	Congress	Representative
2025	58,916	0.14%	0 / 3	63	20th Congress; 2025–2028	(lost election)
Note: A party-list group, can win a maximum of three seats in the House of Representatives.
