= Pork barrel scam =

Philippine political scandal

The Priority Development Assistance Fund scam, also called the PDAF scam or the pork barrel scam, was a political scandal involving the alleged misuse by several members of the Congress of the Philippines of their Priority Development Assistance Fund (PDAF, popularly called "pork barrel"), a lump-sum discretionary fund granted to each member of Congress for spending on priority development projects of the Philippine government, mostly on the national level.

The scam was first exposed in the Philippine Daily Inquirer by Nancy C. Carvajal on July 12, 2013, with the six-part exposé of Carvajal pointing to businesswoman Janet Lim-Napoles as the scam's mastermind after Benhur K. Luy, her second cousin and former personal assistant, was rescued by agents of the National Bureau of Investigation (NBI) on March 22, 2013, four months after he was detained by Napoles at her unit at the Pacific Plaza Towers in Bonifacio Global City. Initially centering on Napoles' involvement in the 2004 Fertilizer Fund scam, the government investigation on Luy's testimony has since expanded to cover Napoles' involvement in a wider scam involving the misuse of PDAF funds from the 2000s to 2013.

It is estimated that the Philippine government was defrauded of some ₱10 billion (US$236 million) over the course of the scam, having been diverted to Napoles, participating members of Congress and other government officials, including 23 senators who managed to steal approximately 10 billion pesos aside from the PDAF and the fertilizer fund maintained by the Department of Agriculture. Around ₱900 million (US$21 million) in royalties earned from the Malampaya gas field was also lost to the scam. The scam has provoked public outrage, with calls being made on the Internet and popular protests demanding the abolition of the PDAF, and the order for Napoles' arrest sparking serious discussion online.

== Background ==
Although the history of pork barrel–like discretionary funds in the Philippines dates back to 1922, during the American colonial period, the PDAF in its current form was established during the administration of Corazon Aquino with the creation of the Countrywide Development Fund (CDF) in 1990. With ₱2.3 billion in initial funding, the CDF was designed to allow legislators to fund small-scale infrastructure or community projects which fell outside the scope of the national infrastructure program, which was often restricted to large infrastructure items. The CDF was later renamed the PDAF in 2000, during the administration of Joseph Estrada.

Since 2008, every member of the House of Representatives usually receives an annual PDAF allocation of ₱70 million, while every senator receives an annual allocation of ₱200 million. The President also benefits from a PDAF-like allocation, the President's Social Fund (PSF), worth around ₱1 billion. Contrary to public belief, however, PDAF allocations are not actually released to members of Congress. Rather, disbursements under the PDAF are coursed via implementing agencies of the Philippine government, and are limited to "soft" and "hard" projects: the former largely referring to non-infrastructure projects (such as scholarships and financial assistance programs, although small infrastructure projects are also considered "soft" projects), and the latter referring to infrastructure projects which would be coursed via the Department of Public Works and Highways.

=== Political patronage ===
Because presidential systems are often prone to political gridlock, the PDAF is often used as a means to generate majority legislative support for the programs of the executive. Furthermore, because PDAF allocations are released by the Department of Budget and Management (DBM), PDAF allocations are often dependent on the relationship a legislator has with the sitting president. For example, during the latter years of the Gloria Macapagal Arroyo administration, she was more generous in allocating PDAF funds in the annual national budget in order to win the favor of legislators. PDAF allocation has gradually increased over the years. For example, before Arroyo stepped down, the last PDAF allocated was for the year 2010 at ₱10.86 billion, but when the Benigno Aquino III administration passed its first budget for 2011, the allocation more than doubled to ₱24.62 billion.

A report by the Philippine Center for Investigative Journalism discussed how the PDAF is prone to corruption, stating that "instead of primarily being a means of helping more people gain access to basic services that the government should have provided them in the first place, PDAF remains a political tool wielded by those in the legislature and the executive to serve their own interests."

=== Opposition to the pork barrel system ===
The pork barrel system has proven to be very unpopular, with numerous calls for its abolition. In 1996, the Philippine Daily Inquirer published an exposé on systematic corruption in the CDF, with an anonymous congressman (since identified as Romeo Candazo of Marikina) elaborating how legislators and other government officials earned from overpricing projects in order to receive large commissions or kickbacks. Public outrage over the misuse of the CDF was instrumental in the enactment of reforms that led to the formation of the PDAF.

The constitutionality of the PDAF has been challenged in the Supreme Court. In 1994, the constitutionality of the CDF was challenged by the Philippine Constitution Association, arguing that the CDF's mechanisms encroach on the executive's power of implementing the budget passed by the legislature, but the Court ruled the CDF constitutional under the legislative's "power of the purse". This ruling was reaffirmed in 2001, when the PDAF was challenged again in the Supreme Court. Legislators themselves are divided on the abolition of the PDAF, with some supporting total abolition, others supporting increased regulation to minimize abuse of PDAF disbursements, and others opposed to it.

== Modus operandi ==
The PDAF or pork barrel scam involved the funding of "ghost projects" that were funded using the PDAF funds of participating lawmakers. These projects were in turn "implemented" through Napoles' companies, with the projects producing no tangible output. According to testimony provided by Benhur Luy's brother, Arthur, funds would be processed through fake foundations and non-governmental organizations (NGOs) established under the wing of the JLN Group of Companies, the holding company of Janet Lim-Napoles, with Napoles' employees—even a nanny—named as incorporators or directors. Each foundation or NGO served as an official recipient of a particular legislator's PDAF funds, and each organization had a number of bank accounts where PDAF funds would be deposited for the implementation of these projects.

Napoles, who specialized in trading agricultural products, frequently used the procurement of agricultural inputs in the propagation of the scam. Either her employees would write to legislators requesting for funds for the implementation of a particular project (e.g. farm inputs), or a legislator would indicate to the DBM a particular recipient agency for his or her PDAF funds that would be pre-selected by Napoles. Once received, this is forwarded to the DBM, which would then issue a Special Allotment Release Order (SARO) indicating the amount deducted from the legislator's PDAF allocation, and later a Notice of Cash Allocation (NCA) given to the recipient agency. The NCA would then be deposited in one of the foundation's accounts, and the funds withdrawn in favor of the JLN Group of Companies. The funds would then be split between Napoles, the lawmaker, the official of the DA responsible for facilitating the transfer of funds and, for good measure, the local mayor or governor. The JLN Group of Companies offered a commission of 10-15% against funds released to local government units and recipient agencies of PDAF funds, while a legislator would receive a commission of between 40 and 50% against the total value of his/her PDAF.

Letters sent by Napoles' employees to participating legislators would also include a letter from a local government unit requesting for funding, bearing the forged signature of the local mayor or governor. All documents involving local government units were prepared by Napoles' staff, and Benhur Luy would forge the signature of the local mayor or governor. Local government officials who were used by Napoles were often unaware that they were participating in the scam. In other instances, however, Napoles would use emissaries to establish contact with local mayors in exchange for commissions that would come from the implementation of these projects.

Every recipient agency participating in the scam had employees or officials that maintained contact with Napoles, allowing for the smooth processing of transactions and the expedient release of PDAF funds to her organizations. Most importantly, Napoles was in regular contact with the DBM through Undersecretary for Operations Mario L. Relampagos, who had three employees (identified as Leah, Malou and Lalaine) responsible for the processing of SAROs destined for Napoles' organizations.

== Accused parties ==
In the initial report published by the Philippine Daily Inquirer, 28 members of Congress (five senators and 23 representatives) were named as participants in the PDAF scam. Twelve of these legislators were identified by the newspaper, and close to ₱3 billion in PDAF funds coming from these legislators alone were exposed to the scam. Notably, the Inquirer named Bong Revilla, Juan Ponce Enrile, Jinggoy Estrada, Bongbong Marcos and Gregorio Honasan as the five senators who participated in the scam. Revilla was the largest contributor among the 28 legislators, with around ₱1.015 billion of his PDAF funds being transferred to organizations identified with the JLN Group of Companies, although the extent to which legislators participated in the scam varied widely.

Members of the Senate & Congress identified by the Inquirer as participants in the PDAF scam
Legislator	Chamber	Party	Amount exposed
Bong Revilla	Senate	Lakas	₱1.015 billion
Juan Ponce Enrile	Senate	PMP	₱641.65 million
Jinggoy Estrada	Senate	PMP	₱585 million
Rizalina Seachon-Lanete	House of Representatives	NPC	₱137.29 million
Bongbong Marcos	Senate	Nacionalista	₱100 million
Conrado Estrella III	House of Representatives	NPC	₱97 million
Edgar L. Valdez	House of Representatives	APEC	₱85 million
Rodolfo Plaza	House of Representatives	NPC	₱81.5 million
Erwin Chiongbian	House of Representatives	Lakas	₱65.35 million
Samuel Dangwa	House of Representatives	Lakas	₱62 million
Robert Raymond Estrella	House of Representatives	Abono	₱41 million
Gregorio Honasan	Senate	Independent	₱15 million
TOTAL			₱2.928 billion

Other legislators identified by the Inquirer as participating in the scam include La Union Representative Victor Ortega and former Representative Arthur Pingoy. Early reports had also identified Senator Loren Legarda as one of the participants in the scam, but Luy later denied her participation.

Legislators identified by the Inquirer as participants in the PDAF scam—Bong Revilla in particular—have denied their participation in the scam. All senators except Jinggoy Estrada denied any knowledge of the scheme (Estrada refused to comment), and Marcos denied being acquaintances with Janet Lim-Napoles. Revilla and Marcos claimed that the investigation into the scam is politically motivated, saying that Malacañang is out to discredit potential candidates for the 2016 presidential election who are not allied with President Aquino: a charge that the administration denied. However, both Revilla and Marcos, as well as Honasan, said they had nothing to hide and indicated their willingness to participate in an investigation.

On August 16, 2013, the Commission on Audit released the results of a three-year investigation into the use of legislators' PDAF and other discretionary funds during the last three years of the Arroyo administration. The report not only affirmed the Inquirer's findings, but also pointed to more legislators being privy to misuse of their PDAF funds. According to the report, between 2007 and 2009, ₱6.156 billion in PDAF funds coming from 12 senators and 180 representatives were disbursed to fund 772 projects found to be implemented in ways that were "not proper and highly irregular". Of the 82 NGOs implementing those projects, ten are linked to Napoles. The report also elaborates on "questionable" transactions made using the PDAF: ₱1.054 billion went to NGOs that were either unregistered, used multiple Tax Identification Numbers (TIN), or issued questionable receipts; while ₱1.289 billion in PDAF disbursements spent were not compliant with the Government Procurement Reform Act of 2003. Lawmakers from across the political spectrum, both past and present, were cited in the report, some of whom (such as Edgardo Angara, Ruffy Biazon, Neptali Gonzales II and Niel Tupas, Jr.) are closely related to President Aquino. Some legislators also donated PDAF funds to NGOs they themselves are affiliated with: these include Angara, Victoria Sy-Alvarado and Matias Defensor, Jr.

In September 2014, the Commission on Audit reported that ₱200 million of Enrile's and Congress representatives' pork barrel funds were given to dubious NGOs through the National Agriculture and Fisheries Council from 2012 to 2013. Among the Congress representatives were Joel Villanueva's brother-in-law, CIBAC party-list representative Sherwin Tugna, and Alagad party-list representative Rodante Marcoleta. As of 2025, the National Agriculture and Fisheries Council has not complied with the Commission on Audit's order to return the ₱200 million.

Other government officials have been implicated as well in the PDAF scam. Agriculture Secretary Proceso Alcala, for example, was accused by Merlina Suñas, Luy's fellow whistleblower, of being complicit in the scam, as his department was responsible for transferring at least ₱16 million in PDAF funds to livelihood projects managed by an NGO linked to Napoles. 97 mayors were also implicated in the scam in connection with the allocation of Malampaya gas field royalties as reconstruction aid for areas affected by Typhoons Ondoy and Pepeng that instead went to Napoles, after it was discovered that employees of the JLN Group of Companies forged their signatures to make it appear that they were requesting for aid. 44 other mayors were likewise implicated in the scam when Napoles, through fashion designer Eddie Baddeo, reportedly facilitated requests for disbursements from the Department of Agriculture's Agricultural Competitiveness Enhancement Fund (ACEF) on behalf of their municipalities. A number of mayors have denied involvement in the scam, including three mayors from Bataan, seven from Ilocos Norte, one from Pangasinan, and one from Iloilo.

In November 2013, a second batch of criminal charges was filed by the National Bureau of Investigation on 33 individuals, including Bureau of Customs Commissioner Ruffy Biazon, who was the first political ally and party-mate of President Benigno Aquino III to be charged in relation to the scam.

Another batch of names were extracted during Janet Lim-Napoles's stay in Ospital ng Makati (Filipino for 'Hospital of Makati') for surgical removal of her ovarian cyst. Over 100 representatives, 2 Cabinet officials and more than 20 current and former senators are being investigated. Panfilo Lacson claimed he also has another list. The Philippine Daily Inquirer claims it received a hard drive containing all transactions of Napoles, Luy, and other JLN Corporation agents from the accused politicians.

The National Bureau of Investigation filed the third batch of charges in August 2015. Separate graft and corruption charges were filed against Honasan, Technical Education and Skills Development Authority Director General Joel Villanueva, Congress representatives Rufus Rodriguez of Cagayan de Oro, Amado Bagatsing of Manila, Conrado Estrella II of Abono party-list, and Victor Ortega of La Union.

A youth group called iBalik ang Bilyones ng Mamamayan (iBBM), in April 2016, sued Bongbong Marcos before the Ombudsman on plunder allegations in relation to ₱205 million of pork barrel funds funneled to fake NGOs.

In July 2016, the Commission on Audit reported that the pork barrel of 4 senators and 17 Congress representatives was released to dubious NGOs from 2007 to 2009. The Commission on Audit alleged that the pork barrel of Senator Villanueva was used while he was CIBAC party-list representative, Marcoleta's while he was SAGIP party-list representative, and Senator Migz Zubiri's while he was Bukidnon 3rd district representative and senator.

== Investigation ==
A number of investigations were organized to determine the extent of the PDAF scam. On July 16, 2013, the Office of the Ombudsman announced that it was forming a special six-person panel initially to investigate the projects bankrolled by the 23 legislators originally named in the Philippine Daily Inquirer, in parallel with the NBI investigation against Napoles. The next day, President Aquino ordered the Department of Justice (DOJ) to conduct and "extensive and fair probe" of the scam, which Napoles also asked for on July 27. Despite calls for the investigation to be made open to the public, Justice Secretary Leila de Lima refused, stating at the time that it was too early for the DOJ investigation to be made public when the NBI was still gathering data on the scam.

Members of Congress called for parallel investigations in both the Senate and the House of Representatives as to the extent of the scam. Despite calls by Senator Francis Escudero to have the scam investigated, the Senate initially agreed not to investigate the scam on August 5, instead opting to wait for the results of the investigations being conducted by the DOJ, the Ombudsman, the NBI and the Commission on Audit before launching its own investigation. However, following the release of the CoA report which implicated more legislators in the scam, the Senate eventually agreed to conduct its own investigation, which would be led by its Blue Ribbon Committee.

The House of Representatives, meanwhile, refused to conduct a probe, with Speaker Feliciano Belmonte, Jr. claiming that the House investigating its own members would be "messy", instead preferring to wait for the results of the DOJ investigation. This was despite the clamor from a number of representatives, mostly from the minority bloc not allied with President Aquino, that the House should conduct its own investigation into the matter.

Following the release of the CoA report, the DOJ was expected to expand its investigation beyond the evidence originally provided by Luy and other whistleblowers. It was also looking at forming either a joint or a parallel investigation with the Ombudsman and the NBI, although its main focus for the time being is on Napoles' involvement in the scam.

Napoles surrendered to President Benigno Aquino III at 9:37 p.m. on August 28. The president gave the DILG secretary Mar Roxas and PNP director Gen. Alan Purisima custody over Napoles for booking and processing.

The NBI and Justice Secretary Leila De Lima filed the cases of plunder and malversation of public funds against businesswoman Janet Lim-Napoles, senators Ramon Revilla Jr., Juan Ponce Enrile, Jinggoy Estrada, and five former representatives on September 16.

== Supreme Court ruling ==
On November 19, 2013, through the landmark ruling in Belgica vs. Ochoa, the Supreme Court of the Philippines en banc declared PDAF as unconstitutional.

The Supreme Court, in a three-page decision penned by Justice Estela Perlas-Bernabe, nullified Congressional Pork Barrel laws, past and present, including the 2013 PDAF, the 1990 Countrywide Development Fund (CDF), and the various Congressional Insertions that let lawmakers to take part in the execution of projects, as these violated the principle of separation of powers. The Supreme Court deemed other similar acts as "grave abuse of discretion amounting to lack or excess of discretion".

The decision also declared as unconstitutional the use by the President of the Malampaya Fund for projects other than those for energy development.

In spite of the Supreme Court ruling that the PDAF was unconstitutional, the PDAF persisted at the Technical Education and Skills Development Authority (TESDA) under TESDA director general Joel Villanueva. According to a Commission on Audit report on TESDA for 2012–2013, lawmakers still provided ₱125.95 pork barrel funds that TESDA spent on projects showing "discrepancies" such as overpriced supplies and training programs, dubious selection of beneficiaries, contracts awarded without bidding, and seminars with dubious lists of participants.

== Trials and convictions ==
The Ombudsman filed charges against senators Juan Ponce Enrile, Jinggoy Estrada, and Bong Revilla before the Sandiganbayan anti-graft court in June 2014. Enrile, who was accused of getting ₱172.8 million in kickbacks, was charged with 15 counts of graft; Estrada, on accusations that he took kickbacks worth ₱183.793, was charged with 11 counts of graft; Revilla, accused of getting kickbacks worth ₱224.5 million, was charged with 16 counts of graft. Enrile's former aide Gigi Reyes was charged with plunder for facilitating the allocation of pork barrel funds to bogus foundations.

In November 2016, the Ombudsman ordered the dismissal of Senator Joel Villanueva after it found Villanueva guilty of "grave misconduct, serious dishonesty, and conduct prejudicial to the interest of the service". The dismissal order stemmed from Villanueva's misuse of ₱10 million of his pork barrel funds while he was in Congress representing CIBAC party-list in 2008.

In May 2022, Davao del Sur representative Marc Douglas Cagas IV was convicted by the Sandiganbayan after he pleaded guilty of fraud and falsification of public documents relating to the misuse of ₱13 million of his pork barrel. In December 2023, the Supreme Court upheld the Ombudsman's ruling of finding probable cause to indict Napoles and DBM officials for graft and corruption for the alleged misuse of Davao del Sur representative Douglas Cagas's pork barrel.

In January 2024, the Sandiganbayan convicted Jinggoy Estrada of 1 count of direct bribery and 2 counts of indirect bribery in the pork barrel case. He was ordered to pay a fine of ₱3 million and could serve up to 16 years in prison. The Sandiganbayan in its August 22 Resolution acquitted Estrada of one count of direct bribery and two counts of indirect bribery, based on reasonable doubt. The Sandiganbayan also convicted Janet Lim-Napoles of 7 counts of corruption of public officials and was sentenced to up to 62 years in prison. She was ordered to pay a fine of ₱262 million. Jinggoy Estrada and Napoles were acquitted of the charges of plunder.

In July 2024, the Sandiganbayan convicted 15 former executives of government corporations of graft and malversation of public funds. The convicted officials made irregular disbursements of ₱51 million from the pork barrel funds of Misamis Occidental Rep. Marina Clarete. Clarete, whose pork barrel was released for bogus livelihood projects, has been in hiding and has not faced trial as of 2024.

On October 4, 2024, the Sandiganbayan acquitted Chief Legal Counsel to the President and former Senate President Juan Ponce Enrile, his former aide Gigi Reyes, and Janet Napoles of plunder in connection with the alleged misuse of Ponce Enrile's Priority Development Assistance Fund during his senatorial term.

In April 2025, the Sandiganbayan rejected Jinggoy Estrada's demurrer to evidence seeking to dismiss 11 graft charges against him.

In May 2025, the Sandiganbayan convicted Muntinlupa Mayor Ruffy Biazon, Napoles, and 3 others for graft over the release of ₱3 million of Biazon's pork barrel to Napoles's Philippine Development Foundation, Inc. Biazon and his co-accused were sentenced to 6 to 8 years in prison and perpetual disqualification from public office.

In June 2025, the Sandiganbayan convicted Napoles and 3 others for graft for the misuse of ₱1.17 million of Joel Villanueva's pork barrel. They were sentenced to 6 to 10 years in prison. Villanueva was not charged in this case.

== Reactions ==
- Cardinal Luis Antonio Tagle, Archbishop of Manila – During a press conference at the University of Santo Tomas, Cardinal Tagle described the scandal as part of an "intricate web of corruption", and said that it is right that the issue be investigated. He added that those involved in the scam have "lost touch with the poor" and should visit a community of informal settlers to understand the issues poor Filipinos face on a daily basis. "We have heard many other big scandals in the past but these were buried and forgotten when a new issue came up", the cardinal added.
- Renato Reyes Jr., Secretary-General of BAYAN coalition – Reyes described the scandal as a "bigger test for the Department of Justice". He also said that the coalition remains doubtful if those involved in the alleged scam will be held liable, including those perceived to be allied with the Aquino administration. Reyes also accused the House of Representatives and Senate of covering up the scam and refusing to open an investigation. BAYAN also reiterated its call for the complete abolition of the PDAF.
- The Philippine Supreme Court issued on September 10, 2013, a temporary restraining order (TRO) against the release of the remaining Priority Development Assistance Funds (PDAF) of lawmakers for 2013 and Malampaya funds.

== Protests ==
On August 26, 2013, thousands of people went to Luneta Park in protest against the pork barrel scheme. The gathering was dubbed the "Million People March". After this, a prayer vigil dubbed "EDSA Tayo" was held on September 11 at the EDSA Shrine, where around 500-700 people attended the vigil. Two days later another protest was held at Luneta where, according to police estimates, about 3,000 people participated. The organizers stated that another rally dubbed "Level Up" would be scheduled for September 21 (with a noise barrage held before the event), and another "Million People March" protest would be held in December.

== Comparison to other discretionary funds ==
After the Supreme Court declared the Priority Development Assistance Funds (PDAF) unconstitutional in 2013, there have been other fund allocations that observers say are similar to the PDAF in that they lack oversight and are prone to corruption. These funds may be abused for political patronage and have been called a legal form of vote-buying.

In 2022, senators questioned the proposed budget requested by the Department of the Interior and Local Government for including ₱10-billion funding for the National Task Force to End Local Communist Armed Conflict, which excluded details on how the fund would be used.

The national budget allots pork barrel funds called "allocable" funds for Department of Public Works and Highways projects. Starting 2023, most of the allocable funds have been channeled to President Bongbong Marcos's relatives in the House of Representatives, namely Leyte 1st District Representative Martin Romualdez and Ilocos Norte 1st District Representative Sandro Marcos.

In 2025, among the programs that have been compared to pork barrel funds and have been criticized as susceptible to corruption are the Ayuda para sa Kapos ang Kita Program (AKAP), Medical Assistance for Indigent Patients (MAIFIP), and Assistance to Individuals in Crisis Situations (AICS).

In 2025, budget watchdog organization the People's Budget Coalition have compared pork barrel funds with billions of pesos in the proposed Philippine budget for 2026, which have been placed in programs that the group says promote political patronage. These programs include the Department of Social Welfare's Aid to Individuals in Crisis, the Department of Labor and Employment's Tulong Panghanapbuhay sa Ating Disadvantaged/Displaced Workers, and the Department of Health's Medical Assistance to Indigent and Financially Incapacitated Patients. Congressional "allocables" for public infrastructure, as well as unprogrammed appropriations (UA) and confidential and intelligence fund (CIF) under the Office of the President, have also been tagged as forms of pork barrel. Makabayan lawmakers estimate that "allocables" comprise ₱230 million for each congress representative and ₱3.2 billion for each senator in the upcoming 2026 budget. Despite accusations that he got billions of pesos in kickbacks in the flood control scandal, former Speaker Romualdez was given ₱6 billion out of ₱500 billion in "allocable" and "non-allocable" DPWH funds.

== See also ==
- People's Initiative Against Pork Barrel
- Corruption in the Philippines
