= Horacio Morales =

Filipino politician

Horacio Morales, Jr.

Secretary of Agrarian Reform
- In office July 1, 1998 – February 11, 2001
- President: Joseph Estrada; Gloria Macapagal Arroyo
- Preceded by: Ernesto Garilao
- Succeeded by: Hernani Braganza

President of the Philippine Rural Reconstruction Movement
- In office 1986–1998

Personal details
- Born: September 11, 1943 Moncada, Tarlac, Philippines
- Died: February 29, 2012 (aged 68) Quezon City, Philippines
- Education: University of the Philippines (BA); University of Oklahoma (MEc)
- Profession: Economist

Horacio "Boy" Morales, Jr. (September 11, 1943 – February 29, 2012) was a Filipino economist and politician. A prominent figure in the underground left during the martial law rule of President Ferdinand Marcos, he later served as Secretary of Agrarian Reform during the presidency of Joseph Estrada.

== Early life and education ==
Morales was born in Moncada, Tarlac. He obtained a Bachelor of Arts in Economics degree from the University of the Philippines in 1965, and a master's degree in economics from the University of Oklahoma in 1968.

== Early government career ==
Morales entered government service in 1965, joining the economic staff of President Ferdinand Marcos as a senior economist. He eventually became the executive vice-president of the Development Academy of the Philippines.

== Underground resistance ==
In 1977, Morales was named among the Ten Outstanding Young Men of the Philippines by the Philippine Jaycees. On the day he was supposed to have received the award, he announced his resignation from the Marcos government to join the underground armed resistance linked to the Communist Party of the Philippines. Morales was active in the underground movement until the Marcos regime found and arrested him in 1982.

== As a political detainee ==
After his arrest in 1982, Morales was arrested and heavily tortured. He remained detained until 1986, when the newly installed presidency of Corazon Aquino ordered his release together with other political prisoners.

== After the Marcos rule ==
In 1987, Morales unsuccessfully ran for a seat in the Philippine Senate under the banner of the Partido ng Bayan. Morales served as President of the Philippine Rural Reconstruction Movement from 1986 to 1998.

In 1998, Morales was appointed to the Cabinet of President Joseph Estrada as Secretary of Agrarian Reform. He served in that capacity until the removal of Estrada from office following the Second EDSA Revolution. Morales also headed Estrada's political party, the Partido ng Masang Pilipino, and served as chairman of the board of the Development Academy of the Philippines during Estrada's term.

Morales remained active with non-governmental organizations after leaving government service.

== Death ==
In December 2011, Morales was stricken by a heart attack in Baguio that left him comatose and in a critical condition. He remained in a coma until his death on February 29, 2012.

== Recognition ==
In 2015, Morales was one of 15 individuals honored by having his name added to the inscriptions on the Wall of Remembrance at the Philippines' Bantayog ng mga Bayani, which honors the martyrs and heroes that fought the authoritarian regime of Ferdinand Marcos. In 2018, Morales was also recognized by the Human Rights Victims Claims Board as a Motu Proprio human rights violations victim of the martial law era.

Government offices
Preceded by Ernesto Garilao	Secretary of Agrarian Reform; 1998–2001	Succeeded by Hernani Braganza
