= Conrado Estrella Sr. =

Filipino politician (died 2011)

Conrado F. Estrella
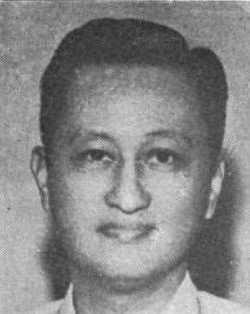
- Estrella in 1967

1st Secretary/Minister of Agrarian Reform
- In office September 10, 1971 – April 30, 1986
- President: Ferdinand Marcos
- Preceded by: Position established
- Succeeded by: Heherson Alvarez

Mambabatas Pambansa (Assemblyman) from Pangasinan
- In office June 30, 1984 – March 25, 1986 Serving with Victor Agbayani, Gregorio Cendaña, Felipe de Vera, Demetrio Demetria, and Fabian Sison

Mambabatas Pambansa (Assemblyman) from Region I
- In office June 12, 1978 – June 5, 1984

Governor of Pangasinan
- In office 1954–1963
- Vice Governor: None (1954–1959); Nancy Sison (1959–1963)
- Preceded by: Juan de Rodriguez
- Succeeded by: Francisco Duque Jr.

Personal details
- Born: August 19, 1917
- Died: May 31, 2011 (aged 93) Pasig, Metro Manila, Philippines
- Party: Kilusang Bagong Lipunan (from 1978)

Conrado Favis Estrella Sr. (August 19, 1917 – May 31, 2011) was a Filipino politician. He served as the Governor of Pangasinan from 1954 to 1963 and Secretary and Minister of the Department of Agrarian Reform from 1971 to 1986. He was the grandfather of Abono Rep. Robert Raymond Estrella and former Pangasinan Rep. Conrado Estrella III.

Estrella began his political career as the Mayor of Rosales, Pangasinan. He was elected as an assemblyman to the Batasang Pambansa, the House of Representatives of the Philippines, from 1978 to 1986. He served as the Secretary and Minister of the Department of Agrarian Reform under former President Ferdinand Marcos from 1971 until Marcos' ouster in 1986. Marcos and Estrella were political allies.

Estrella's last public appearance was on January 10, 2011, in Pangasinan for the 66th anniversary of the WWII Allied Invasion of Lingayen Gulf.

Estrella died in his sleep at his home in Valle Verde, Pasig, at the age of 93. He was found the next morning on May 31, 2011. He had undergone open heart surgery several years prior, but had no other major illnesses.
