= Secretary of Agrarian Reform =

Cabinet secretary of a Philippine government agency

- Kalihim ng Repormang Pansakahan

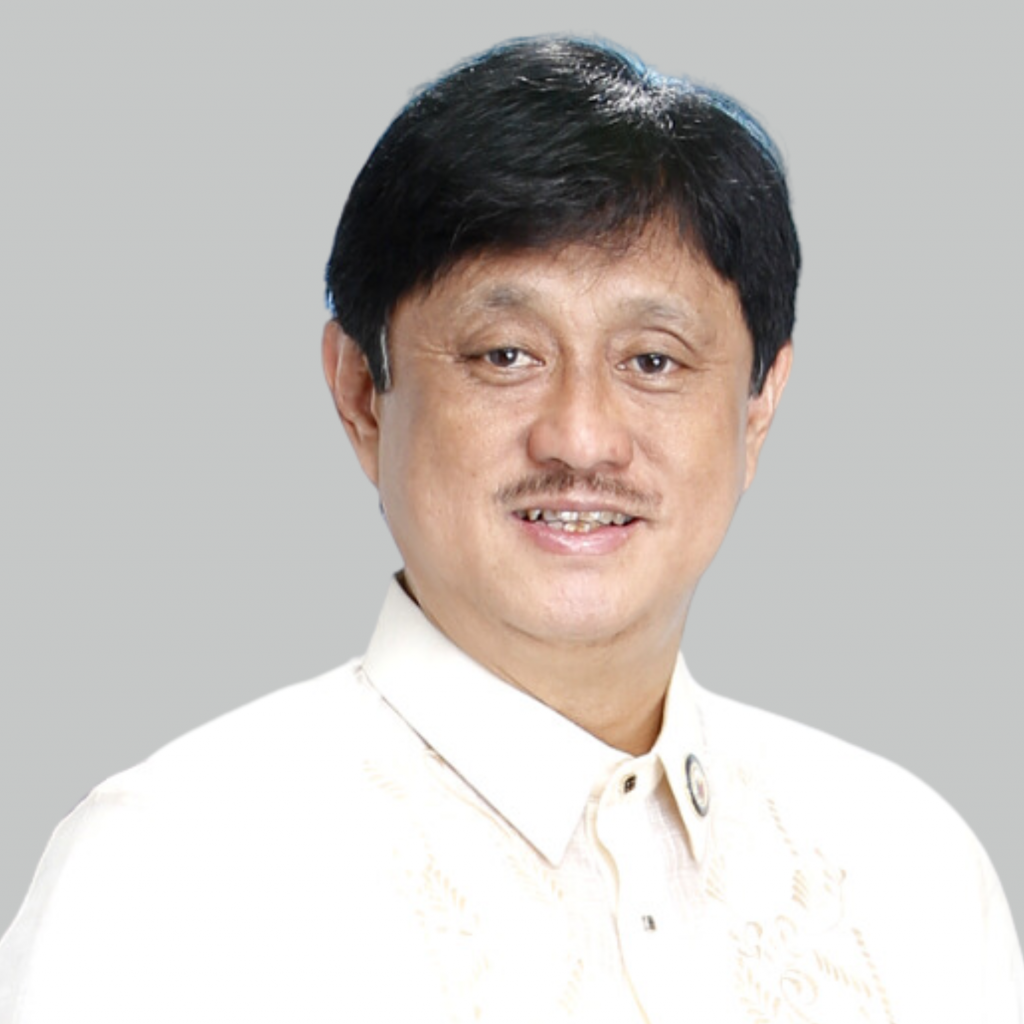
- Incumbent; Conrado Estrella III since June 30, 2022
- Style: The Honorable
- Member of: Cabinet
- Appointer: The president with the consent of the Commission on Appointments
- Term length: No fixed term
- Precursor: Governor of the Land Authority
- Inaugural holder: Conrado F. Estrella
- Formation: September 10, 1971
- Website: http://www.dar.gov.ph

The secretary of agrarian reform (Filipino: Kalihim ng Repormang Pansakahan) in the Philippines is the head of the country's Department of Agrarian Reform and is a member of the president's Cabinet.

== Powers and functions ==
According to the Administrative Code of 1987, the following are the powers and functions of a secretary:

- Advise the president on matters under a department's jurisdiction;
- Establish the policies and standards for a department's operation;
- Promulgate rules and regulations;
- Promulgate administrative issuances;
- Exercise disciplinary powers over officers and employees under a secretary;
- Appoint officers and employees in a department;
- Exercise jurisdiction over a department's bureaus, offices, agencies and corporations;
- Delegate authority to officers and employees;
- Perform other functions provided by law.

== List ==
=== Secretary of Agrarian Reform (1971–1978) ===
Portrait	Name (Birth–Death)	Took office	Left office	President
	Conrado Estrella Sr. (1917–2011)	September 10, 1971	June 2, 1978	Ferdinand Marcos

=== Minister of Agrarian Reform (1978–1987) ===
President Ferdinand Marcos issued Presidential Decree No. 1397 on June 2, 1978, converting all departments into ministries headed by ministers.

Portrait	Name (Birth–Death)	Took office	Left office	President
	Conrado Estrella Sr. (1917–2011)	June 2, 1978	April 30, 1986	Ferdinand Marcos
	Conrado Estrella Sr. (1917–2011)	June 2, 1978	April 30, 1986	Corazon Aquino
	Heherson Alvarez (1939–2020)	May 1, 1986	February 11, 1987	Corazon Aquino

=== Secretary of Agrarian Reform (1987–2004) ===
President Corazon Aquino issued Administrative Order No. 15 on February 11, 1987, converting all ministries into departments headed by secretaries.

Portrait	Name (Birth–Death)	Took office	Left office	President
	Heherson Alvarez (1939–2020)	February 11, 1987	March 7, 1987	Corazon Aquino
	Philip Juico (1947–2026)	July 23, 1987	July 1, 1989	Corazon Aquino
	Miriam Defensor Santiago (1945–2016)	July 20, 1989	January 4, 1990	Corazon Aquino
	Florencio Abad (born 1954)	January 4, 1990	April 5, 1990	Corazon Aquino
	Benjamin Leong	April 6, 1990	June 30, 1992	Corazon Aquino
	Ernesto Garilao	June 30, 1992	June 30, 1998	Fidel V. Ramos
	Horacio Morales (1943–2012)	June 30, 1998	February 11, 2001	Joseph Estrada
	Horacio Morales (1943–2012)	June 30, 1998	February 11, 2001	Gloria Macapagal Arroyo
	Hernani Braganza	February 12, 2001	January 15, 2003	Gloria Macapagal Arroyo
	Roberto Pagdanganan (born 1946)	January 20, 2003	January 20, 2004	Gloria Macapagal Arroyo
	Jose Mari Ponce; Acting	February 20, 2004	August 24, 2004	Gloria Macapagal Arroyo
	Rene Villa	August 26, 2004	September 27, 2004	Gloria Macapagal Arroyo

=== Secretary of Land Reform (2004–2005) ===
President Gloria Macapagal Arroyo issued Executive Order No. 364 on September 27, 2004, renaming the Department of Agrarian Reform into the Department of Land Reform.

Portrait	Name (Birth–Death)	Took office	Left office	President
	Rene Villa	September 27, 2004	July 9, 2005	Gloria Macapagal Arroyo
	Nasser Pangandaman	July 9, 2005	August 23, 2005	Gloria Macapagal Arroyo

=== Secretary of Agrarian Reform (from 2005) ===
President Gloria Macapagal Arroyo issued Executive Order No. 456 on August 23, 2005, renaming the Department of Land Reform back to the Department of Agrarian Reform.

Portrait	Name (Birth–Death)	Took office	Left office	President
	Nasser Pangandaman	August 23, 2005	June 30, 2010	Gloria Macapagal Arroyo
	Gil de los Reyes	June 30, 2010	June 30, 2016	Benigno Aquino III
	Rafael V. Mariano (born 1956); Interim	June 30, 2016	September 6, 2017	Rodrigo Duterte
	Rosalina Bistoyong; Officer in Charge	September 12, 2017	November 30, 2017	Rodrigo Duterte
	John Castriciones (Note: John Castriciones served in an acting capacity from December 1, 2017 until March 22, 2018.) (born 1962)	December 1, 2017	March 22, 2018	Rodrigo Duterte
	John Castriciones (born 1962)	March 22, 2018	October 14, 2021	Rodrigo Duterte
	Bernie Cruz; Acting	October 28, 2021	June 22, 2022	Rodrigo Duterte
	David Erro; Officer in Charge	June 22, 2022	June 30, 2022	Rodrigo Duterte
	Conrado Estrella III (born 1960)	June 30, 2022	Incumbent	Bongbong Marcos
