= Abono Partylist =

Political party in the Philippines

Abono
- — Philippine partylist —
- Sector(s) represented: Agriculture and other marginalized populations
- Ideology: La Union regionalism

Current representation (20th Congress)
- Seats in the House of Representatives: 1 / 3 (Out of 63 party-list seats)
- Representative(s): Robert Raymond Estrella

Abono (transl. fertilizer) is a political organization in the Philippines which had party-list representation in the House of Representatives of the Philippines. In the May 14, 2007 election, the party won one seat in the nationwide party-list vote.

As a party-list it intends to represent the agriculture and marginalized sector especially the population of La Union province. The chair and treasurer of Abono is Rosendo O. So.

== Members ==
The Abono party list had one seat in the party-list sector of the House of Representatives of the Philippines, held by Conrado Estrella III. Estrella was a Pangasinense lawyer before becoming a party-list representative.

In 2015, Abono party-list representatives Conrado Estrella III and Raymond Estrella were among the lawmakers charged for the pork barrel scam for the alleged misuse of their Priority Development Assistance Fund (PDAF). According to the National Bureau of Investigation, Conrado Estrella III allegedly received ₱45,030,000 in kickback from pork barrel scam mastermind Janet Lim-Napoles, while Raymond Estrella received ₱22,675,000.

In 2015, the Philippine Commission on Audit released several notices of disallowance against Estrella for the alleged misuse of his PDAF, worth ₱64 million, allocated to dubious livelihood projects in Pangasinan through dubious organizations.

Peasant rights watchdog Tanggol Magsasaka included Abono on its list of party-list groups that "exploit the struggles and aspirations of farmers."

== Ideology ==
The Abono Party-list believes that farmers should have more livelihood programs, and also believing to represent La Union in the House of Representatives of the Philippines.

Abono was the biggest spender among party-list groups during the campaign period from January 2021 to March 2022, according to data from Nielsen Ad Intel show, having spent ₱377.34 million on advertisements, including ads aired before the start of the campaign period on February 8.

== Electoral performance ==
Election	Votes	%	Seats
2007	340,002	2.12%	2
2010	766,993	2.58%	2
2013	768,265	2.77%	2
2016	732,060	2.26%	2
2019	378,204	1.36%	1
2022	288,752	0.78%	1
2025	254,474	0.61%	1

== Representatives to Congress ==
Period	1st Representative	2nd Representative
14th Congress; 2007–2010	Robert Raymond Estrella	Francisco Ortega III
15th Congress; 2010–2013	Robert Raymond Estrella	Francisco Ortega III
16th Congress; 2013–2016	Conrado Estrella III	Francisco Ortega III
17th Congress; 2016–2019	Conrado Estrella III	Vini Nola Ortega
18th Congress; 2019–2022	Conrado Estrella III	—N/a
19th Congress; 2022–2025	Robert Raymond Estrella	—N/a
20th Congress; 2025–2028	Robert Raymond Estrella	—N/a
Note: A party-list group, can win a maximum of three seats in the House of Representatives.

== Controversies ==
In 2024, the partylist's president, Umingan, Pangasinan, councilor Ponciano Onia Jr., was shot dead in an ambush.
