= Conrado Estrella III =

Filipino politician (born 1960)

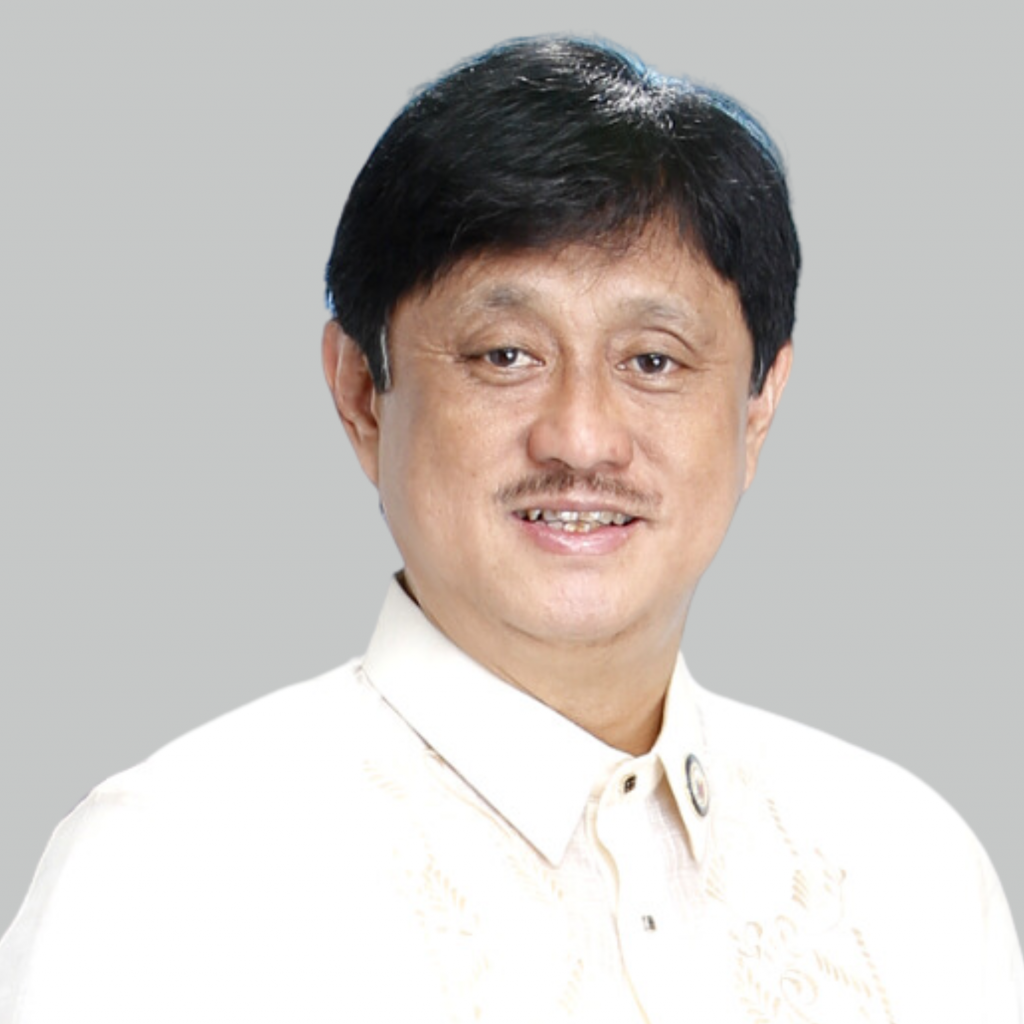
- Official portrait, 2022

15th Secretary of Agrarian Reform
- Incumbent
- Assumed office June 30, 2022
- President: Bongbong Marcos
- Preceded by: David Erro (OIC)

Deputy Speaker of the House of Representatives of the Philippines
- In office July 22, 2019 – June 1, 2022 Serving with several others
- House Speaker: Alan Peter Cayetano; Lord Allan Velasco

Member of the Philippine House of Representatives for Abono
- In office June 30, 2013 – June 30, 2022 Serving with Vini Nola Ortega (2016–2019); Francisco Emmanuel Ortega III (2013–2016)

Member of the Philippine House of Representatives from Pangasinan's 6th congressional district
- In office June 30, 2001 – June 30, 2010
- Preceded by: Ranjit Shahani
- Succeeded by: Marlyn Primicias-Agabas
- In office June 30, 1987 – June 30, 1995
- Preceded by: Newly created
- Succeeded by: Ranjit Shahani

Personal details
- Born: Conrado Masonsong Estrella III; September 12, 1960 (age 66) Manila, Philippines
- Citizenship: Filipino
- Party: Abono (2012–present)
- Other political affiliations: NPC (1992–2012); KBL (1980–1992)
- Spouse: Sandra S. Romero
- Relatives: Robert Raymond Estrella (brother); Conrado Estrella Sr. (grandfather); Drew Arellano (cousin); Iya Villania (cousin-in-law)
- Education: De La Salle University (BA)

Conrado Masonsong Estrella III (born September 12, 1960) is a Filipino politician serving as the 15th secretary of agrarian reform since 2022. He previously served as a representative for Abono Partylist from 2013 to 2022 and for Pangasinan's sixth district from 1987 to 1995 and from 2001 to 2010. He was previously one of the deputy speakers of the 18th Congress under the leadership of first of Speaker Alan Peter Cayetano and then Speaker Lord Allan Velasco.

== Early life and education ==
Estrella was born on September 12, 1960, in Manila to former Congressman Robert B. Estrella Sr. and Ma. Teresita Masonsong-Estrella. He is the grandson of Conrado Estrella Sr., a former governor of Pangasinan and secretary/minister of Agrarian Reform during the Marcos Sr. administration.

He graduated from De La Salle University with a degree in history and political science.

== Local politics ==
His early political career began in the Kabataang Barangay (KB) where he became the president of the provincial KB federation of Pangasinan, chairman of the regional KB federation of Ilocos Region, and member of the KB National Council. From 1980 to 1985, he was a member of the Pangasinan Provincial Board.

== House of Representatives of the Philippines ==
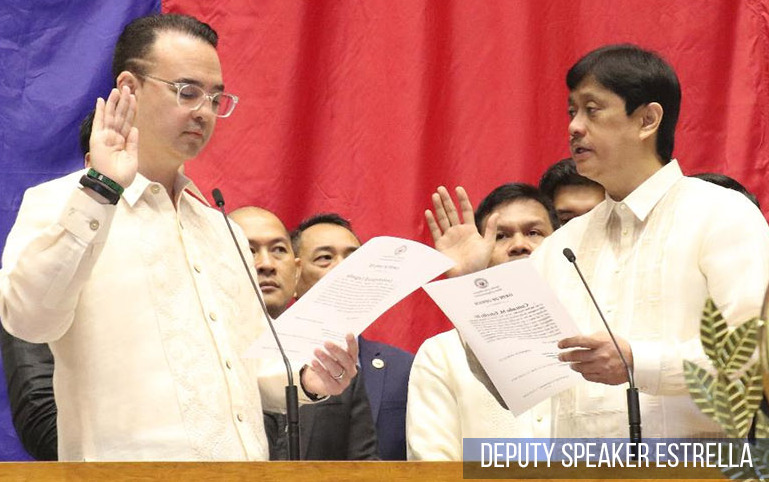
Estrella taking his oath of office as Deputy House Speaker on July 27, 2019

Estrella was elected to the House of Representatives of the Philippines in 1987 and 1992, representing Pangasinan's sixth district. In the 8th Congress, he ran under the Kilusang Bagong Lipunan, was one of the youngest elected representative at age 26 and was a member of the opposition. It was reported that his first campaign was funded by Ferdinand Marcos. In the 9th Congress, he was the vice-chairman of the House Committees on Accounts and Tourism. In 1994, he was offered by then-President Fidel V. Ramos to head the Philippine Sports Commission in an attempt to block his reelection bid where he would run against Ranjit Shahani, Ramos' nephew and son of then-Senator Leticia Ramos-Shahani. The sports community, however, did not approve of the plan prompting Ramos to appoint Philip Juico instead. Estrella ultimately withdrew from the race and was later appointed to the Manila Economic and Cultural Office where he served as one of its directors from 1995 to 1998. During the Estrada presidency, he became the administrator of the National Electrification Administration.

Estrella returned to the House of Representatives as the representative of the 6th district of Pangasinan in 2001 and served until 2010. During the 12th Congress, he was the chairman of the House Special Committee on the North Luzon Growth Quadrangle. In 2013, he became the party-list representative of Abono succeeding his brother Robert Raymond Estrella. He was among the 23 representatives linked to the pork barrel scam by a Philippine Daily Inquirer exposé in 2013. In August 2015, the National Bureau of Investigation charged Estrella and his brother with malversation, direct bribery, and other graft and corrupt practices before the Ombudsman. That same year, he was served numerous notices of disallowances from the Commission on Audit with regards to the use of his Priority Development Assistance Fund to implement livelihood projects worth ₱64 million in Pangasinan coursed through questionable non-governmental organizations. He was later excluded from liability by the commission in 2018 due to a court decision which declared his signatures in the documents facilitating the transactions to be forgeries.

On July 10, 2020, he was one of the 70 representatives who voted to reject the franchise renewal of ABS-CBN.

== Secretary of agrarian reform (since 2022) ==
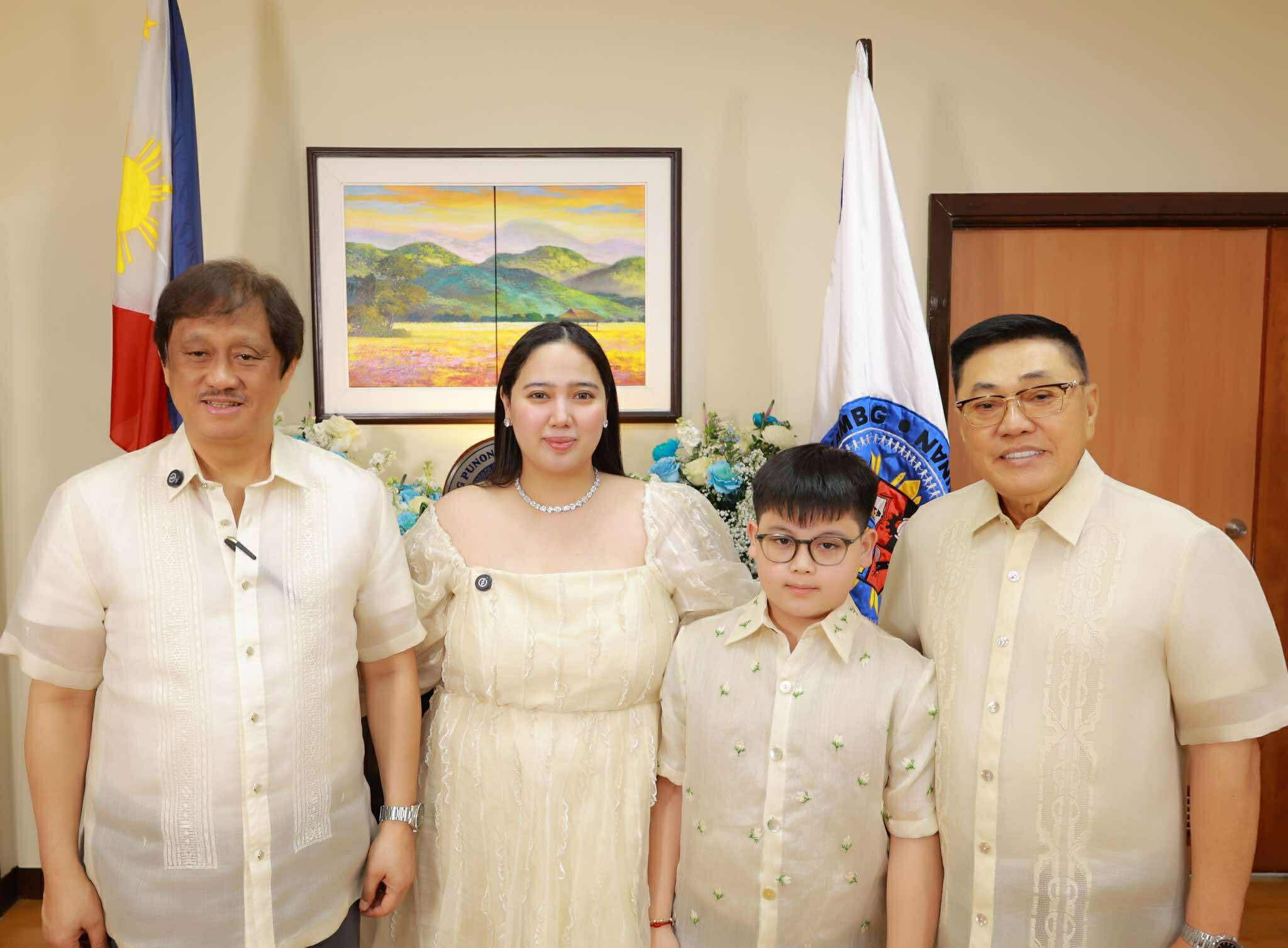
Estrella with Bayambang mayor Niña Jose-Quiambao and her family in 2025

On June 8, 2022, Estrella accepted the offer of President Bongbong Marcos to head the Department of Agrarian Reform as its secretary. His grandfather, Conrado Estrella Sr., was also secretary from 1971 to 1986.

== Personal life ==
Estrella married Sandra S. Romero on June 7, 1985, at the age of 24. The couple produced four children: Maria Sergia Susana, Conrado Andrew IV, Albert and Gilbert.

Political offices
Preceded by David Erro (OIC)	Secretary of Agrarian Reform; 2022–present	Incumbent
House of Representatives of the Philippines
New district	Member of the Philippine House of Representatives from Pangasinan's 6th District; 1987–1995	Succeeded by Ranjit Shahani
Preceded by Ranjit Shahani	Member of the Philippine House of Representatives from Pangasinan's 6th District; 2001–2010	Succeeded by Marlyn L. Primicias-Agabas
Order of precedence
Preceded by Rex Gatchalian as Secretary of Social Welfare and Development	Order of Precedence of the Philippines as Secretary of Agrarian Reform	Succeeded by Juan Miguel Cuna as Secretary of Environment and Natural Resources; OIC
