= Janet Lim-Napoles =

Filipino businesswoman and convicted criminal (born 1964)

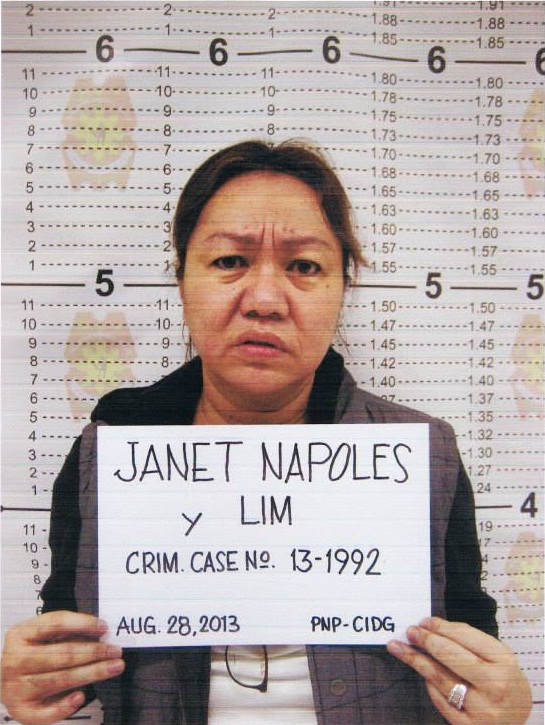
- Janet Lim-Napoles's official mugshot
- Born: Janet Luy Lim; January 15, 1964 (age 62); Malabon, Rizal, Philippines
- Occupation: Businesswoman
- Known for: Masterminding the PDAF scam
- Status: Incarcerated
- Convictions: Serious illegal detention (2015; acquitted on appeal, 2017); plunder (2018); graft (3 counts, 2021); malversation of public funds (3 counts, 2021); Corruption of public officials (7 counts, 2024)
- Criminal charges: graft and malversation of public funds (multiple counts, pending)
- Penalty: Reclusion perpetua

Details
- Imprisoned at: Correctional Institution for Women, Mandaluyong (since April 16, 2015)

Janet Lim-Napoles (Note: Her given name was also spelled as Jannet on her birth certificate.) (born Janet Luy Lim; January 15, 1964) is a Filipino businesswoman who is believed to have masterminded the Priority Development Assistance Fund (PDAF) Scam. She was convicted of plunder for her involvement in the PDAF Scam and is facing charges for alleged involvement in the misuse of the Malampaya fund for disaster response operations.

== Early life ==
Janet Luy Lim was born in Malabon, then a municipality of Rizal. She is the fourth of five children of a Chinese Filipino couple: Johnny Co Lim (born Lim King Sing) and Magdalena "Nelly" Lim Luy. (Note: Mely Francisco Luy on Janet Lim-Napoles' birth certificate.)

The family lived in Binondo, Manila until December 1970, when Johnny Co Lim died, and Luy returned with her children to her hometown of Maluso, Basilan. Napoles, who was six at the time, studied at the Maluso Central Elementary School, and completed her secondary education at a local Claretian school. The family ran the Luys' sari-sari store, and delivered drinks to workers at the local port. However, some residents of Maluso have claimed that the Luys were a rich family, owning a fish drying business and plots of land. As the security situation in Basilan began to deteriorate, and the family received threats of extortion, the Lim family moved back to Manila.

Napoles reportedly met her husband, Jaime G. Napoles, on board a ferry which traversed between Mindanao and Visayas. They married in April 1982, when she was 18. In Manila, the couple lived in Fort Bonifacio, where the young Napoles ran a carinderia.

== Business career and government involvement ==
Napoles's business interests date back to the early 1990s. In 1993, she solicited for investments in a shipyard in Cebu, promising 5% interest on all investments. It was later discovered that the money was not invested in the shipyard: according to Col. Ariel Querubin, who was a friend of the Napoles family, the money they had invested in the shipyard was reportedly invested elsewhere, with Napoles pocketing the interest. While the investment was eventually recovered, Querubin claims the investment led to the death of his first wife.

In 2001, Napoles and her husband were implicated in the acquisition by the Armed Forces of the Philippines of ₱3.8 million worth of substandard Kevlar helmets, and were charged with graft and malversation of public funds by the Sandiganbayan (people's special tribunal). While her husband was dropped from the list of defendants in 2002, Janet Napoles stood trial, and was acquitted on October 28, 2010, for lack of evidence.

In 2013, it was revealed that Janet Napoles's JLN Corporation had paid significantly less taxes than the average local public school teacher. Records show that from 2009 to 2011, the company paid between ₱9,036 and ₱25,164 in annual taxes, whereas a public school teacher at that time would have paid around ₱35,952 per year.

=== Pork barrel scam ===
Priority Development Assistance Fund (PDAF) was a program initially implemented in 1990, designed to allow legislators to fund small-scale infrastructure or community projects which fell outside the scope of the national infrastructure program. It was later ruled as unconstitutional by the Supreme Court of the Philippines.

Napoles has been linked with an alleged misuse of PDAF, together with Philippine Senators Bong Revilla, Jinggoy Estrada, Juan Ponce Enrile, and other congressmen.

She was convicted of plunder on December 7, 2018, for her involvement in the PDAF scam, with the conviction being upheld by the Sandiganbayan anti-graft court on March 13, 2019.

In 2021, the Sandiganbayan convicted Napoles on three counts of graft and three counts of malversation, along with Cagayan de Oro Rep. Constantino Jaraula and three others, in connection with the ₱10 billion (US$203.05 million) pork barrel scam. Napoles was sentenced to 6 to 10 years imprisonment for each count of graft and 12 to 18 years for each count of malversation. Napoles stole government funds through the state-owned Technology and Livelihood Resource Center and the nongovernmental organization Countrywide Agri and Rural Economic Development Foundation.

In October 2023, Napoles was convicted by the Sandiganbayan of 9 counts of corruption of a public official while former APEC party-list Rep. Edgar Valdez was convicted of 9 counts of direct bribery.

Also in October 2023, the Sandiganbayan convicted Napoles of 4 counts of graft and 4 counts of malversation of public funds, in connection with the PDAF of former South Cotabato Rep. Arthur Pingoy Jr.

In January 2024, Napoles was convicted 7 counts of corruption of public officials and was sentenced to up to 62 years in prison. She was also ordered to pay a fine of ₱262 million (US$5.32 million), with regard to PDAF funds of Senator Jinggoy Estrada. Estrada was convicted on one count of committing direct bribery and two counts of indirect bribery, but both Napoles and Estrada were acquitted of the charges of plunder.

In 2026, she has been convicted again (along with other former government staff of the Department of Agrarian Reform) on separate cases but of similar nature, being penalized further at least 64 years of imprisonment (on top of what were handed previously).

=== Illegal detention case ===
Napoles was accused of illegally detaining Benhur Luy, her cousin and former employee in 2014. Luy's three-month custody under Napoles ended in March 2014. Napoles alleged that Luy took a ₱5.5 million loan under her name without her authorization. She also alleged that Luy was supposed to deposit ₱300,000 into her account but did not do so, accusing Luy of theft. Luy insists that he was detained by Napoles due to fears that he would expose Napoles's alleged significant role in the PDAF scam. Lim was later found guilty beyond reasonable doubt and was sentenced to reclusión perpetua on April 14, 2015. Napoles and her lawyers have indicated that they will appeal the decision to the Court of Appeals.

==== 2017 motion to acquit ====
The Office of the Solicitor General with the court of appeals filed a "manifestation in lieu of rejoinder" recommending the acquittal of Janet Lim Napoles in the Luy detention case. This motion by the Solicitor General Jose Calida was backed by Philippine President Rodrigo Duterte, who said that he himself would move for the dismissal of the case citing selective prosecution under Aquino administration. The criminal actions must proceed against all responsible according to Duterte.

=== Fertilizer fund scam ===
Napoles and six others were indicted in 2018 for their involvement in the Fertilizer Fund scam. The group was indicted for graft and malversation of public funds over PHP5 million worth of projects, including the anomalous purchase of fertilizers in 2004 in Surigao del Norte. Jo Chris Trading, a firm owned by Napoles, was tagged as the distributor of allegedly overpriced and diluted liquid fertilizers. Fertilizer funds totaling ₱728 million were allegedly diverted in a vote-buying scheme involving favored local officials.

The Sandiganbayan's fourth division, in a resolution promulgated on October 27, 2023, but made public the following month, granted the motions filed by Napoles, by a president of non-government organization Philippine Social Development Foundation Inc., as well as by four former officials of the Department of Agriculture–Caraga, to dismiss the charges against them, citing inordinate delay in the investigation by the Ombudsman, which took more than six years since the complaint was filed in 2017.

=== Malampaya fund scam ===
Napoles is facing charges for her alleged involvement in the Malampaya fund scam. The case involves the misuse of ₱900 million sourced from the fund for disaster response operations in the aftermath of Tropical Storm Ondoy (Ketsana) and Typhoon Pepeng (Parma) in 2009. The amount did not go to the communities affected by the disasters, but was allegedly plundered after being released to nongovernmental organizations linked to Napoles.

Napoles was charged for plunder by the National Bureau of Investigation before the Ombudsman in October 2013, along with former President Gloria Macapagal-Arroyo, former Budget Secretary Rolando Andaya, former executive secretary Eduardo Ermita, former agrarian reform secretary Nasser Pangandaman.

Napoles and Andaya were charged in 2019 before the Sandiganbayan for allegedly violating the Anti-Graft and Corrupt Practices Act.

== Personal life ==
Janet Napoles's husband was a major in the Philippine Marine Corps who participated in the God Save the Queen coup attempt against President Corazón Aquino. Originally a reservist, he later applied for active duty status, and eventually retired from the Marines on December 31, 2004. Together, they have four children, Jo Christine, James Christopher, Christian, and Jean. Jo Christine Napoles is the president of the Metro Manila chapter of the OFW Family Club party list, and was the group's third nominee to the House of Representatives until she withdrew her nomination on August 8, 2013. Jean Napoles has been criticized for her ostentatious lifestyle, including owning a $2 million unit at the Ritz-Carlton in Los Angeles while she studied fashion design at the Fashion Institute of Design & Merchandising. The Philippines Department of Justice (DOJ) has filed a P17.88-million tax evasion case against Jean Napoles.

Jo Christine and James Christopher were charged with graft related to the pork barrel scam and the Malampaya fund scam. Janet Napoles, children Jo Christine, James Cristopher, and Jean Catherine, her brother Reynald Luy Lim, and his wife Ana Marie were indicted by a U.S. court for domestic and international money laundering.

There are conflicting accounts as to the net worth of the Napoles family. While Napoles has described her family as middle class, acquaintances in Basilan claim that her maternal family had old money, which she confirmed in an earlier interview as having inherited. Her extended family in Basilan, however, has denied her claims of such an inheritance. She has also claimed that most of her wealth was due to sound investments, mostly with coal trading in several countries but particularly in Indonesia. However, the profitability of Napoles' business ventures has been questioned: according to disclosures made with the Securities and Exchange Commission in 2011 and 2012, the corporations under the JLN Group of Companies reported a total net income of less than ₱1 million, and Merlina Suñas, one of the whistleblowers in the PDAF scam, has alleged that the Napoleses are not knowledgeable about the coal industry.

In other disclosures made to the SEC, it was revealed that Napoles owned at least 28 houses in a number of cities in Luzon, with her family members also holding property in the United States. She also maintains, according to the Department of Justice, around 415 accounts with seventeen banks. The Napoles family also maintains a fleet of 30 vehicles, which are all registered under the flagship company of the JLN Group of Companies, JLN Corporation.

Napoles is a member of the Roman Catholic Church and has close ties with a number of Catholic clergy. She maintained a home for priests in Makati which was run by Monsignor Josefino S. Ramirez, who previously served as rector of the Quiapo Church, where her mother funded the church's feeding programs for the poor. Ramirez reportedly brought the image of the Black Nazarene on a number of occasions to Napoles' house, where they would hear Mass, and has confirmed that he received from her a monthly stipend of ₱150,000, and lived in one of Napoles' houses. The Roman Catholic Archdiocese of Manila has distanced itself from Napoles, saying that the projects she funded were part of Ramirez's personal apostolate and are not official projects of the archdiocese.

== Health ==
Janet Lim-Napoles was admitted to the Ospital ng Makati on March 31, 2014, for treatment of a uterine cyst. On April 1, 2014, she underwent a series of tests, including electrocardiography (ECG), two-dimensional echocardiogram (2D-echo) and an X-ray. The following day, she underwent a blood test, and a week later underwent an endometrial biopsy examination despite her high blood sugar levels.
