= Alaminos =

Alaminos may refer to:

- Alaminos, Cyprus, a village in Cyprus
- Alaminos, Guadalajara, a municipality in Spain
- Alaminos, Laguna, a municipality in the Philippines
- Alaminos, Pangasinan, a city in the Philippines
  - Alaminos Airport, located in Alaminos
