= Mabini, Pangasinan =

Municipality in Pangasinan, Philippines

Mabini Balincaguin
- Municipality
- Municipality of Mabini
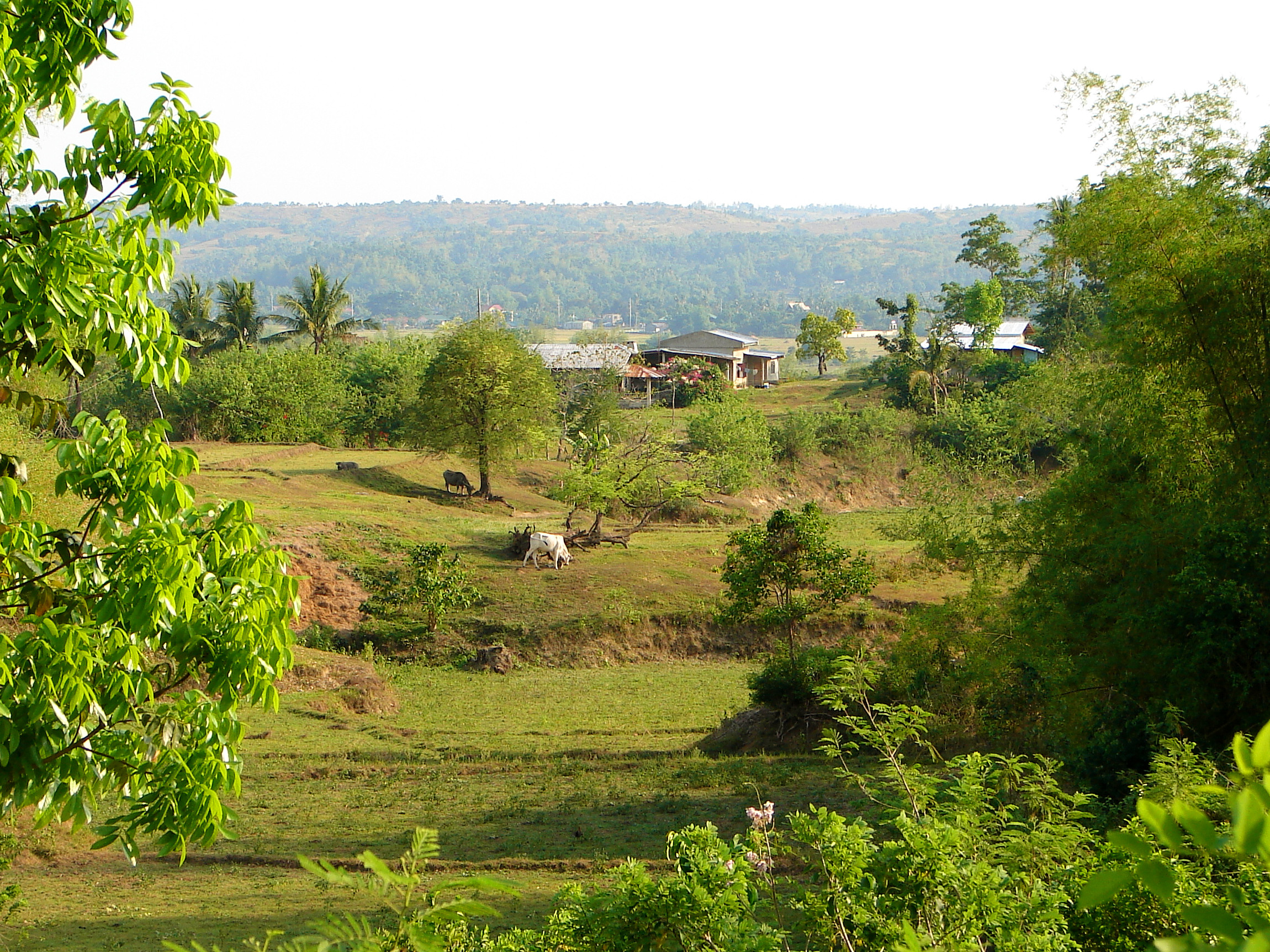
- Fields in Mabini

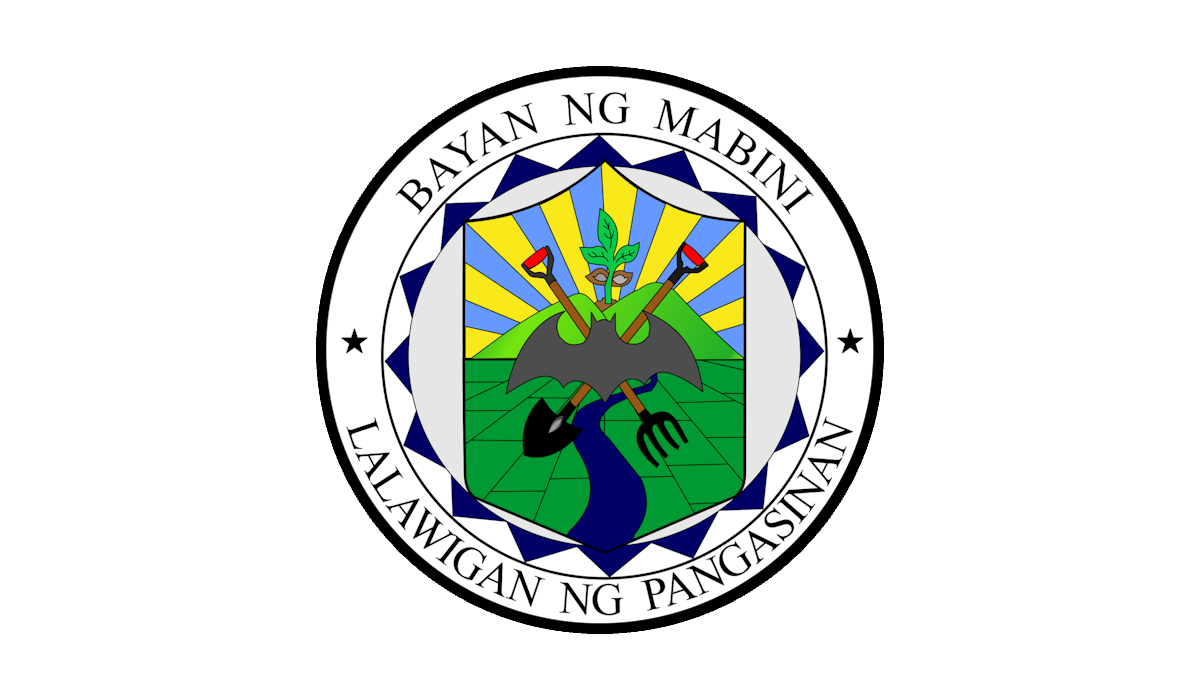
- Flag Seal

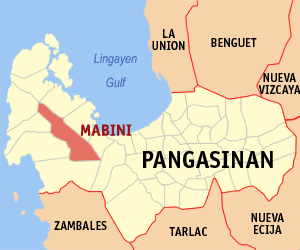
- Map of Pangasinan with Mabini highlighted
- Interactive map of Mabini
- Location within the Philippines
- Coordinates: 16°04′11″N 119°56′24″E
- Country: Philippines
- Region: Ilocos Region
- Province: Pangasinan
- District: 1st district
- Founded: 1929
- Named for: Apolinario Mabini
- Barangays: 16 (see Barangays)

Government
  - Type: Sangguniang Bayan
  - Mayor: Colin A. Reyes (NP)
  - Vice Mayor: Renillo C. Malalis (NP)
  - Representative: Arthur F. Celeste (NP)
  - Municipal Council: Members: Ariel Justo R. De Guzman (API); Roger V. Romero (IND); Fernando C. Fontelera (NP); Alvin B. Briana (NP); Christian Karl B. Pamo (NP); Jose L. Barao Jr. (API); Mary Ann F. Supangan (NP); Richard N. Barrocan (API)
  - Electorate: 18,157 voters (2025)

Area
  - Total: 291.01 km^{2} (112.36 sq mi)
- Elevation: 51 m (167 ft)

Population (2024 census)
  - Total: 26,589
  - Density: 91.368/km^{2} (236.64/sq mi)
  - Households: 6,650

Economy
  - Income class: 2nd municipal income class
  - Poverty incidence: 16.11% (2023)
  - Revenue: ₱ 214.4 million (2024)
  - Assets: ₱ 547.2 million (2024)
  - Expenditure: ₱ 194.5 million (2024)
  - Liabilities: ₱ 39.54 million (2024)

Service provider
  - Electricity: Pangasinan 1 Electric Cooperative (PANELCO 1)
- Time zone: UTC+8 (PST)
- ZIP code: 2409
- PSGC: 0105523000
- IDD : area code: +63 (0)75
- Native languages: Pangasinan; Ilocano; Sambal; Tagalog
- Website: www.mabini-pangasinan.gov.ph

Mabini, officially the Municipality of Mabini (Pangasinan: Baley na Mabini; Ilocano: Ili ti Mabini; Tagalog: Bayan ng Mabini), is a municipality in the province of Pangasinan, Philippines. According to the 2024 census, it has a population of 26,589 people.

The municipality was formerly called Balincaguin.

== History ==
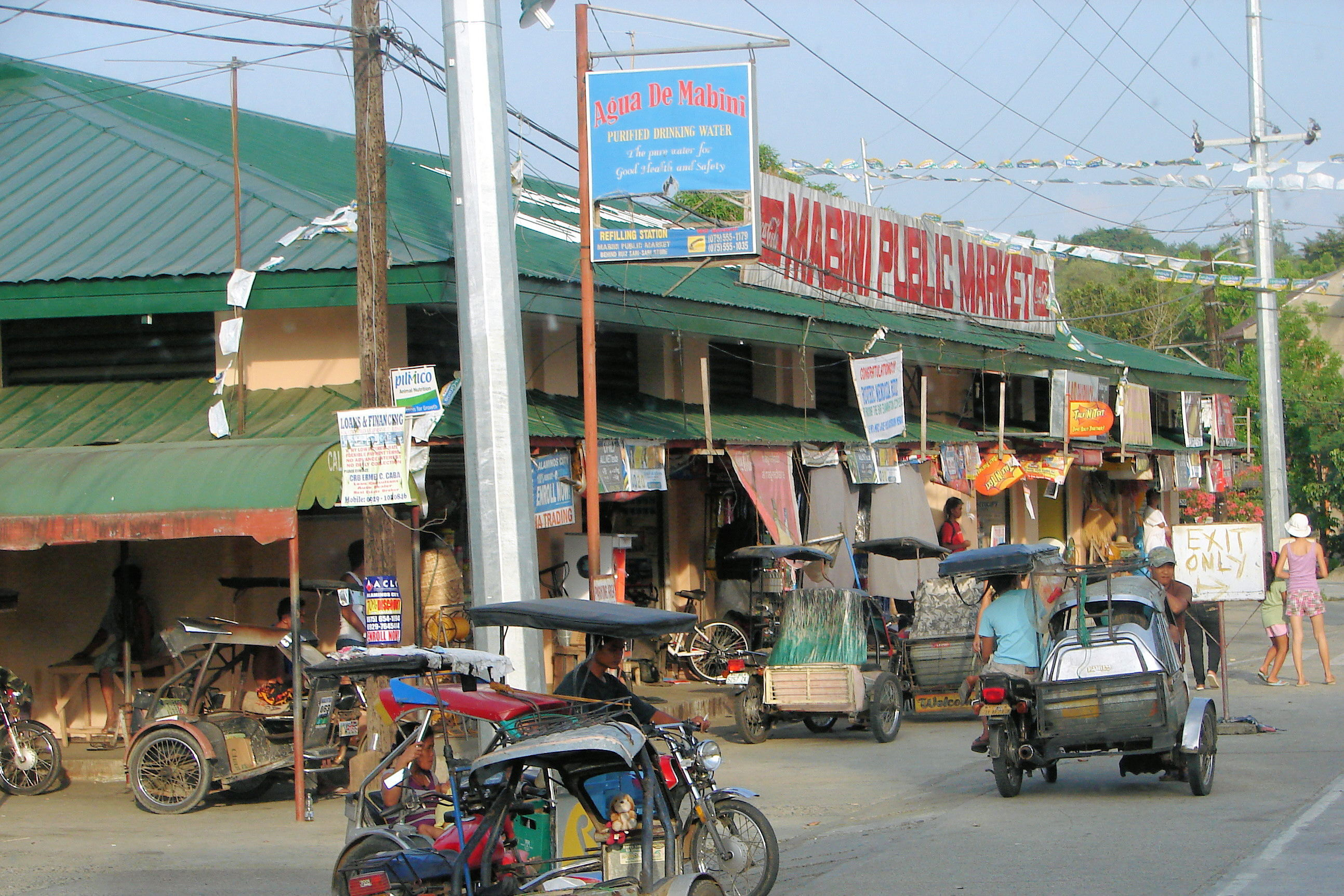
Mabini Public Market

The Municipality of Mabini used to be part of the Province of Zambales and was surrounded by mountains, forests, and valleys. It was originally called "Balincaguin" that was derived from the Zambal phrase "Bali Lan Caguin" which means "abode of bats". This name referred to the nocturnal mammals (bats) that inhabited the caves found in the hills and mountains between the municipality and Zambales in the west and Tarlac to the south-west.

The place is believed to have been founded in 1610 by Spanish missionaries from the Order of Augustinian Recollects. In 1800, Balincaquin became a town under Don Isidro Puzon who is believed to be the founder. Some of its population (770 families) were Ilocanos who moved to the municipality due to its agricultural potential. The site where these settlers situated near the mountains used to be called "Conventa."

Good quality rice was then consistently produced and marketed to Manila and even to China. Other products such as corn, sugar cane, cotton and so forth were also demanded and consequently distributed widely in numerous markets. Apart from agriculture, the industry of saddle-making, knapsack-making, and hat-weaving existed. The residents also engaged in tending to livestock such as cattle, carabaos, horses, and goats. At the same time, a gradual increase in the number of bats compelled the residents to catch them. These mammals were suspected of flying through the nearby forests because of the catching that lasted until 1930.

On October 15, 1903, by virtue of Act No. 945, entitled “An Act Reducing the Twenty-five Municipalities of the Province of Zambales to Fifteen,” while still part of the Province of Zambales, the municipality of San Isidro (Burgos) was consolidated with the municipalities of Balincaguin (Mabini) and Dasol, with the seat of the municipal government at San Isidro (Burgos).

On November 30, 1903, by virtue of Act No. 1004, the municipalities of Bolinao, Alaminos, San Isidro, and Infanta were annexed to the Province of Pangasinan.

On December 19, 1903, by virtue of Act No. 1029, Act No. 1004 was amended to include the municipalities of Anda, Bani, and Agno among those annexed to the Province of Pangasinan.

On February 10,1908, by virtue of Executive Order No. 12, issued by Governor-General James F. Smith, Balincaguin was separated from San Isidro (Burgos), effective January 1, 1909.

On November 23, 1929, by virtue of Act No. 3552, the name of the municipality of Balincaguin was changed to Mabini.

== Geography ==
Mabini is situated 48.32 kilometres (30.02 mi) from the provincial capital Lingayen, and 257.25 kilometres (159.85 mi) from the country's capital city of Manila. It is between Burgos and Alaminos on the Olongapo–Bugallon Road.

=== Barangays ===
Mabini is politically subdivided into 16 barangays. Each barangay consists of puroks and some have sitios.

- Bacnit
- Barlo
- Caabiangan
- Cabanaetan
- Cabinuangan
- Calzada
- Caranglaan
- De Guzman
- Luna - formerly known as Balayang
- Magalong
- Nibaliw
- Patar
- Poblacion
- San Pedro
- Tagudin
- Villacorta

=== Climate ===
Climate data for Mabini, Pangasinan
Month	Jan	Feb	Mar	Apr	May	Jun	Jul	Aug	Sep	Oct	Nov	Dec	Year
Mean daily maximum °C (°F)	31 (88)	31 (88)	31 (88)	33 (91)	32 (90)	32 (90)	30 (86)	30 (86)	30 (86)	31 (88)	31 (88)	31 (88)	31 (88)
Mean daily minimum °C (°F)	21 (70)	21 (70)	22 (72)	24 (75)	24 (75)	24 (75)	23 (73)	23 (73)	23 (73)	23 (73)	23 (73)	22 (72)	23 (73)
Average precipitation mm (inches)	5.1 (0.20)	11.6 (0.46)	21.1 (0.83)	27.7 (1.09)	232.9 (9.17)	350.8 (13.81)	679.8 (26.76)	733.1 (28.86)	505 (19.9)	176.6 (6.95)	67.2 (2.65)	17.7 (0.70)	2,828.6 (111.38)
Average rainy days	3	3	3	4	14	18	23	25	22	15	8	4	142
Source: World Weather Online

== Demographics ==
Population census of Mabini
Year	Pop.	±% p.a.
1903	3,101	—
1918	4,760	+2.90%
1939	7,510	+2.20%
1948	9,185	+2.26%
1960	10,548	+1.16%
1970	12,769	+1.93%
1975	15,894	+4.49%
1980	15,979	+0.11%
1990	17,628	+0.99%
1995	19,115	+1.53%
2000	21,035	+2.07%
2007	23,338	+1.44%
2010	24,011	+1.04%
2015	24,765	+0.59%
2020	26,454	+1.40%
2024	26,589	+0.12%
Source: Philippine Statistics Authority

== Economy ==
Poverty incidence of Mabini (%)

Source: Philippine Statistics Authority

== Government ==
=== Local government ===
Mabini is part of the first congressional district of the province of Pangasinan. It is governed by a mayor, designated as its local chief executive, and by a municipal council as its legislative body in accordance with the Local Government Code. The mayor, vice mayor, and the councilors are elected directly by the people through an election which is being held every three years.

=== Elected officials ===
Members of the Mabini Municipal Government (2025-2028)
Position	Name
Congressman	Arthur F. Celeste (NP)
Municipal Mayor	Colin A. Reyes (NP)
Municipal Vice-Mayor	Renillo C. Malalis (NP)
Municipal Councilors	Ariel Justo R. De Guzman (API)
Municipal Councilors	Roger V. Romero (IND)
Municipal Councilors	Fernando C. Fontelera (NP)
Municipal Councilors	Alvin B. Briana (NP)
Municipal Councilors	Christian Karl B. Pamo (NP)
Municipal Councilors	Jose L. Barao Jr. (API)
Municipal Councilors	Mary Ann F. Supangan (NP)
Municipal Councilors	Richard N. Barrocan (API)

=== List of municipal mayors ===
The municipal heads from the time when it was founded up to the present.

1. Capitan Isidro Puzon 1800
2. Juan Mendoza 1801
3. Roberto Espinosa 1802
4. Juan Eusebio 1803
5. Francisco Dizon 1804
6. Pascual dela Cruz 1805
7. Nicolas Galla 1806
8. Antonio Mendoza 1807
9. Lorenzo Pinoliar 1808
10. Domingo Alejandro 1809
11. Francisco dela Rosa 1810
12. Francisco Paragas 1811
13. Juan Salazar 1812
14. Vicente Dizon 1813
15. Jacinto Mendoza 1814
16. Nicolas Galla 1815
17. Jacinto de Mendoza 1816
18. Roberto Espinosa 1817
19. Benito dela Cruz 1818
20. Jose dela Cruz 1819
21. Miguel Roque 1820
22. Mariano de Mendoza 1821
23. Basilio dela Rosa 1822
24. Gregorio Galla 1823
25. Simeon Carambas 1824
26. Antonio Francisco 1825
27. Jose dela Cruz 1826
28. Juan Rivera 1827
29. Vicente Dizon 1828
30. Juan Rivera 1829
31. Vicente Dizon 1830
32. Francisco de Aquino 1831
33. Sabas Rodriguez 1832
34. Jacinto de Mendoza 1833
35. Antonio Domingo 1834
36. Juan Damian 1835
37. Miguel dela Cruz 1836
38. Juan Estrada 1837
39. Juan Dizon 1838
40. Juan Rivera 1839
41. Urbano Ferrer 1840
42. Hilario dela Cruz 1841
43. Agapito Francisco 1842
44. Nazario dela Cruz 1843
45. Carlos delos Reyes 1844
46. Ambrosio Ramos 1845
47. Claudio de San Miguel 1846
48. Cecilio Estrada 1847
49. Gregorio de Mendoza 1848
50. Martin Rivera 1849
51. Capitan Cipriano de Mendoza 1850
52. Santiago Balcorta 1851
53. Juan Bautista de Guzman 1852
54. Cipriano de Mendoza 1853
55. Agapito Braganza 1854
56. Leoncio Estrada 1855
57. Ponciano Padilla 1856
58. Cicilio Estrada 1857
59. Agapito Braganza 1858-1860
60. Juan Bautista de Guzman 1861-1862
61. Canoto Ferrer 1863-1864
62. Pedro Rodriguez 1865-1866
63. Juan Bautista de Guzman 1867-1868
64. Felix Erum 1869-1870
65. Martin Rivera 1871-1872
66. Agapito Braganza 1873-1874
67. Domingo Rodriguez 1875-1876
68. Pedro Rodriguez 1877-1878
69. Hipolito Braganza 1879-1880
70. Nicolas Rivera 1881-1882
71. Patricio Braganza 1883
72. Quirino de Guzman 1884
73. Antonio Erum 1885-1886
74. Guillermo Valderama 1887-1888
75. Aniceto Rivera 1889-1890
76. Escolastico del Barrio 1891-1892
77. Bruno Braganza 1893
78. Cirilo Braganza 1894-1895
79. Bruno Braganza 1896
80. Aniceto Rivera 1897-1900
81. Cirilo Braganza 1901
82. Bruno Braganza 1902
83. Marcelo Braganza 1903
84. President Paulino Mendoza 1904-1905
85. Francisco Bustamante 1906-1907
86. Jacinto Braga 1908-1909
87. Paulino Rodriguez 1910
88. Marcelo Braganza 1911-1912
89. Simeon del Barrio 1913-1916
90. Modesto Ferrer 1917-1920
91. Jose Braganza 1921-1926
92. Modesto Ferrer 1927-1928
93. Lope Braganza 1929-1934
94. Mayor Pedro Rodriguez 1935-1940
95. Mamerto Rodriguez 1941
96. Felimon Erum 1941-1944
97. Angel Taoatao 1946-1947
98. Demetrio Braganza 1948-1955
99. Justo de Guzman 1956-1959
100. Juan Barrocan 1959
101. Crispulo Braganza 1960-1963
102. Demetrio Braganza 1964-1971
103. Demetrio Braganza 1972-1976
104. Juan Supangan 1976-1980 (By Succession)
105. Dominador Braganza 1980-1986
106. Ariel de Guzman June 1986-Nov.1986 ( OIC-Appointed)
107. Dominador Braganza Dec. 1986-Nov. 30, 1987
108. Virgilio Braganza Dec. 1987- Jan. 1988 (OIC-Appointed)
109. Dominador Braganza Jan. 1988- Dec.22, 1989
110. Romeo Boling Dec.23, 1989- June 30, 1992 (By Succession)
111. Ariel de Guzman July 1, 1992- June 30, 2001
112. Alimar Briana July 1, 2001- June 30, 2004
113. Ariel de Guzman July 1, 2004- June 30, 2007
114. Carlitos Reyes July 1, 2007 – June 30, 2016
115. Alimar Briana July 1, 2016 - June 30, 2019
116. Ariel de Guzman July 1, 2019 - June 30, 2022
117. Colin A. Reyes July 1, 2022 - present

== Education ==
The Mabini Schools District Office governs all educational institutions within the municipality. It oversees the management and operations of all private and public elementary and high schools.

=== Primary and elementary schools ===
- Caabiangan Elementary School
- Cabanaetan Elementary School
- Cabinuangan Elementary School
- Calzada Elementary School
- Caranglaan Elementary School
- Dalupang Elementary School
- De Guzman Elementary School
- Luna Elementary School
- Mabini Central School
- Magalong Elementary School
- Mangatarem Catholic School
- Patar Elementary School
- San Pedro Elementary School
- Sta. Rita Elementary School
- Sto. Niño Learning Center
- Surod Elementary School
- Tagudin Elementary School
- Villacorta Elementary School

=== Secondary schools ===
- Bacnit Integrated School
- Barlo Integrated School
- Cabanaetan National High School
- Magalong National High School
- Riverview High School
- Tagudin National High School
- Saint Adelaide School

== Notable personalities ==
- Gloria Romero

== Gallery ==
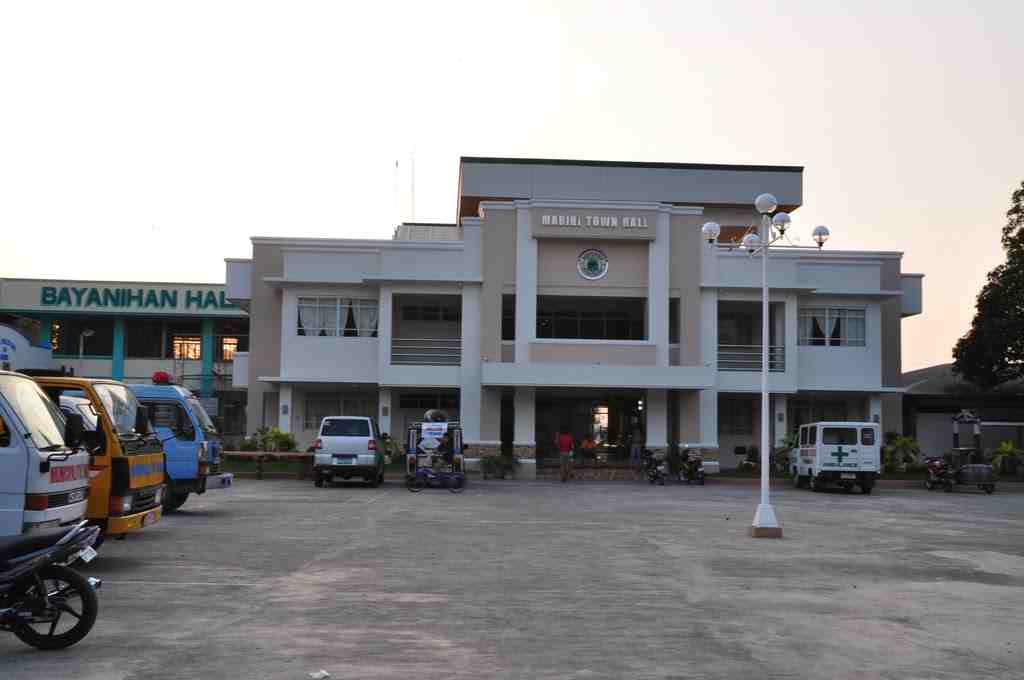
Municipal Hall of Mabini

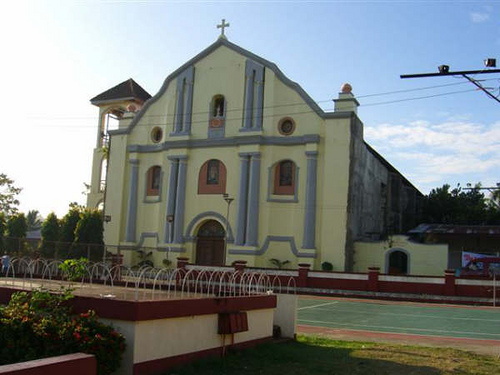
Santo Niño Parish Church

== See also ==
- List of renamed cities and municipalities in the Philippines
