= Juan Alaminos y Vivar =

Spanish general (1813–1899)

Juan Alaminos de Vivar
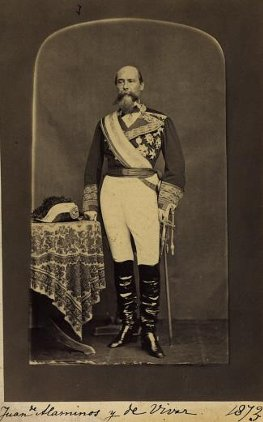
- Alaminos in 1873

96th Governor-General of the Philippines
- In office 24 January 1873 – 17 March 1874
- Monarch: Amadeo I
- President: Estanislao Figueras; Francesc Pi i Margall; Nicolás Salmerón y Alonso; Emilio Castelar; Francisco Serrano
- Preceded by: Manuel MacCrohon (interim)
- Succeeded by: Manuel Blanco de Valderrama (interim)

Senator of Córdoba
- In office 1872–1873

Senator of Burgos
- In office 1871–1872

Personal details
- Born: 27 October 1813 Cuéllar, Spain
- Died: 1899 (aged 85–86)

Military service
- Allegiance: Spain
- Branch/service: Spanish Army
- Rank: Lieutenant general
- Battles/wars: First Carlist War; First Moroccan War

Juan Alaminos de Vivar (1813–1899) was a Spanish general who served as the 96th Governor-General of the Philippines.

== Biography ==
There is not much known about the early career of Alaminos other than that he was from Cuéllar, and that he was born on 27 October 1813. His military career began with his participation in the First Carlist War (1833–1839). He then served under General Juan Prim, 1st Marquis of los Castillejos during the Hispano-Moroccan War (1859–60). In 1871, he was elected as Senator of Burgos, and the following year (1872) as Senator of Córdoba. Before the abdication of King Amadeo I of Spain, Alaminos was sent to assume the position of Governor-General of the Philippines on 24 January 1873. He was the first Governor-General to arrive and depart from the Philippines on a steamship. During his term, Alaminos fought against the Archbishop of Manila, Gregorio Melitón Martínez, keeping the conflict between the colonial government and the church ongoing. It was during the administration of former Governor-General Carlos María de la Torre y Navacerrada when the conflict was rekindled. In around 1870, the governor-general appointed Luis Alcalá-Zamora as Bishop of Cebu but it was not approved by Archbishop Gregorio Melitón Martínez. Alaminos was replaced by an interim governor in 1874, during the administration of President Francisco Serrano, 1st Duke of la Torre. He died in 1899. During his administration in the Philippines, Alaminos, Pangasinan and Alaminos, Laguna were named in his honor.

=== Family ===
Alaminos hails from a 17th-century noble family from Úbeda. Juan's brother, Francisco Alaminos de Vivar, was a lawyer. He served as mayor of Rute in 1828, and of Cabra in 1834. Meanwhile, Juan's nephew, Francisco Alaminos y Chacón, served as his adjutant, and later as Governor of Luzon.

Preceded by Manuel MacCrohon	Governor General of the Philippines; 1873–1874	Succeeded by Manuel Blanco Valderrama
