= Santo Niño Parish Church (Mabini) =

Roman Catholic church in Pangasinan, Philippines

Mabini Church
- Santo Niño Parish Church
- Iglesia Parroquial del Sto. Niño de Mabini (Spanish); Simbahan ng Mabini (Filipino)
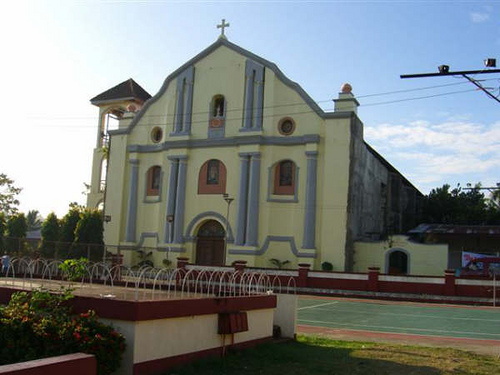
- Façade of the reconstructed church in 2014

- Location in Luzon Location in the Philippines
- 16°04′07″N 119°56′27″E
- Location: Mabini, Pangasinan
- Country: Philippines
- Denomination: Roman Catholic

History
- Status: Parish church
- Dedication: Sto. Niño

Architecture
- Functional status: Active
- Architectural type: Church building
- Style: Early Renaissance

Administration
- Archdiocese: Lingayen-Dagupan
- Diocese: Alaminos

Clergy
- Archbishop: Socrates B. Villegas
- Bishop: Napoleon Sipalay

Santo Niño Parish Church, commonly known as Mabini Church, is a Roman Catholic church in the municipality of Mabini (formerly Balincaguin) in Pangasinan, Philippines. It is under the jurisdiction of the Diocese of Alaminos. The church was established by Fray Andrés del Espíritu Santo in 1830 and constructed under the patronage of the Holy Infant Jesus or Santo Niño.

== History ==
The church had withstood several natural and man-made calamities over the past decades. The Great Flood of 1832 submerged the convent of the church; it forced the residents to settle at the upper levels, where they are now at present. The church was struck by a lightning in 1852. The fire ignited spontaneously because of the cogon grass stored inside the structure. Padre Mariano Torrente repaired the church during his term from 1858 to 1872. After 49 years, the Flood of Don Nicolas occurred in 1881, almost submerging the 20 metres (66 ft), Olumbuaya Hill. From 1893 to 1898, several repair works were done by Padre Epifanio Vergara. The Flood of Don Osting happened at Mabini in 1957; more than 700 people living in low-lying areas were affected by the flood.

In December 12, 1999, the 1830 church was torn down by a strong earthquake. Few structural components and foundation remained intact. However, majority of the stone walls, façade, and the altar collapsed. The old church of Mabini was restored and blessed on 2005. On the other hand, the old convent and the parish office were transferred to the opposite side of the church in 2006. This side used to be a chapel before the restoration of the new Mabini church.

== Architectural features ==
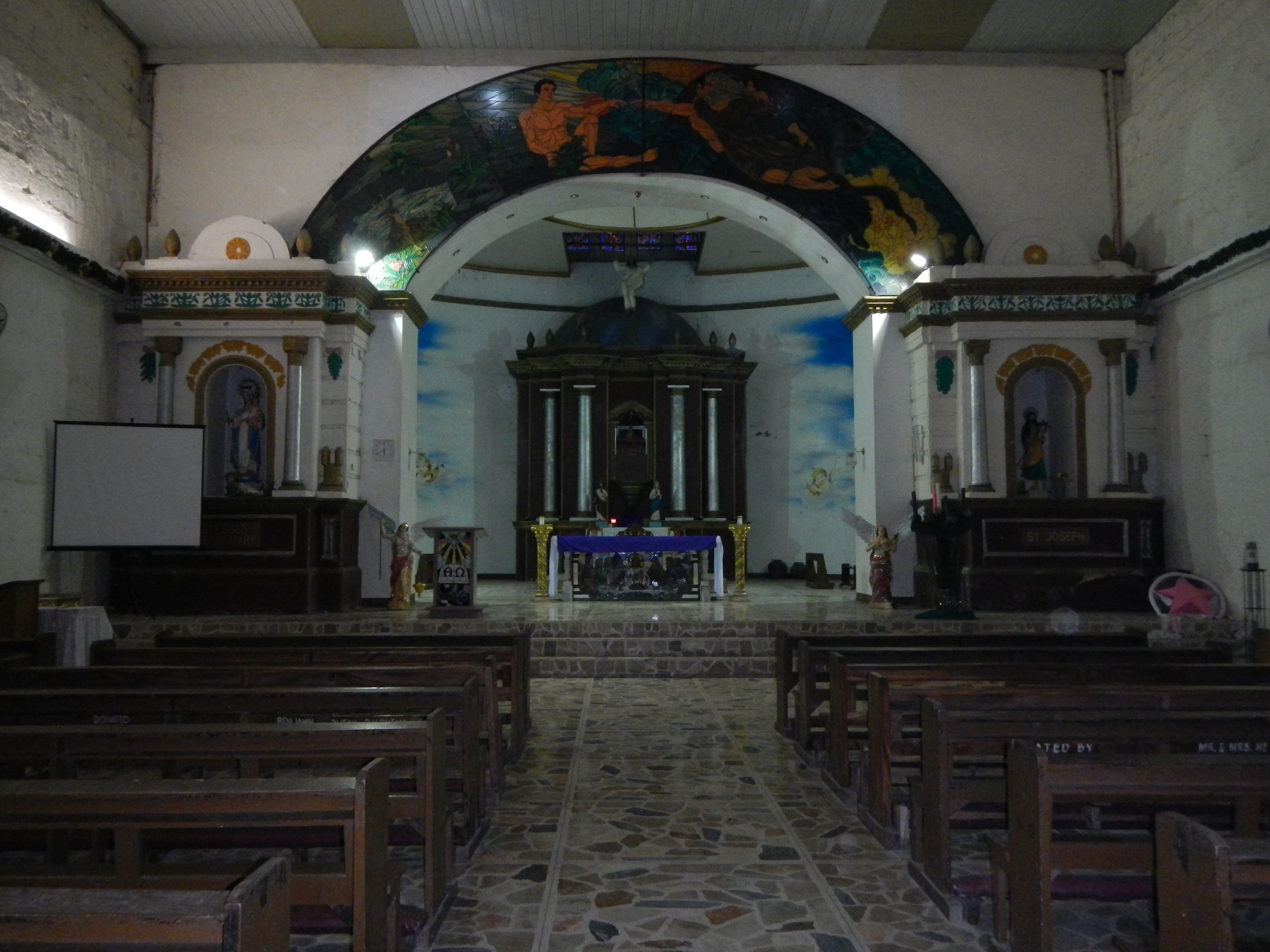
Church interior in 2013

The church was built in the early Renaissance architectural style. Its façade is characterized by large Doric columns on pedestals covering the whole height of the first level. The paired columns at the center flanked the main entrance up to the pediment. There were semi-circular windows on the upper walls of the second level. A statued niche and circular windows on the sides fill the walls of the pediments. The bell tower on the left is a later addition.
