= Alaminos Airport =

Proposed airport in the Philippines

Alaminos Airport, also known as Hundred Islands International Airport, is a proposed airport project in Alaminos, Pangasinan, Philippines. The project was approved in 2007, with the site selected in 2009. Construction began in March 2010, and the airport was initially targeted to open for domestic flights by 2012 or 2013, later revised to 2016 or 2017, with international operations planned by 2022. The proposed airport would occupy 158.5 hectares (392 acres) across the barangays of Sabangan, Pandan, and Telbang, with an estimated cost of ₱3.9 billion. As of present, the project remains stalled due to various issues.
