= Alaminos, Guadalajara =

Alaminos
- Municipality
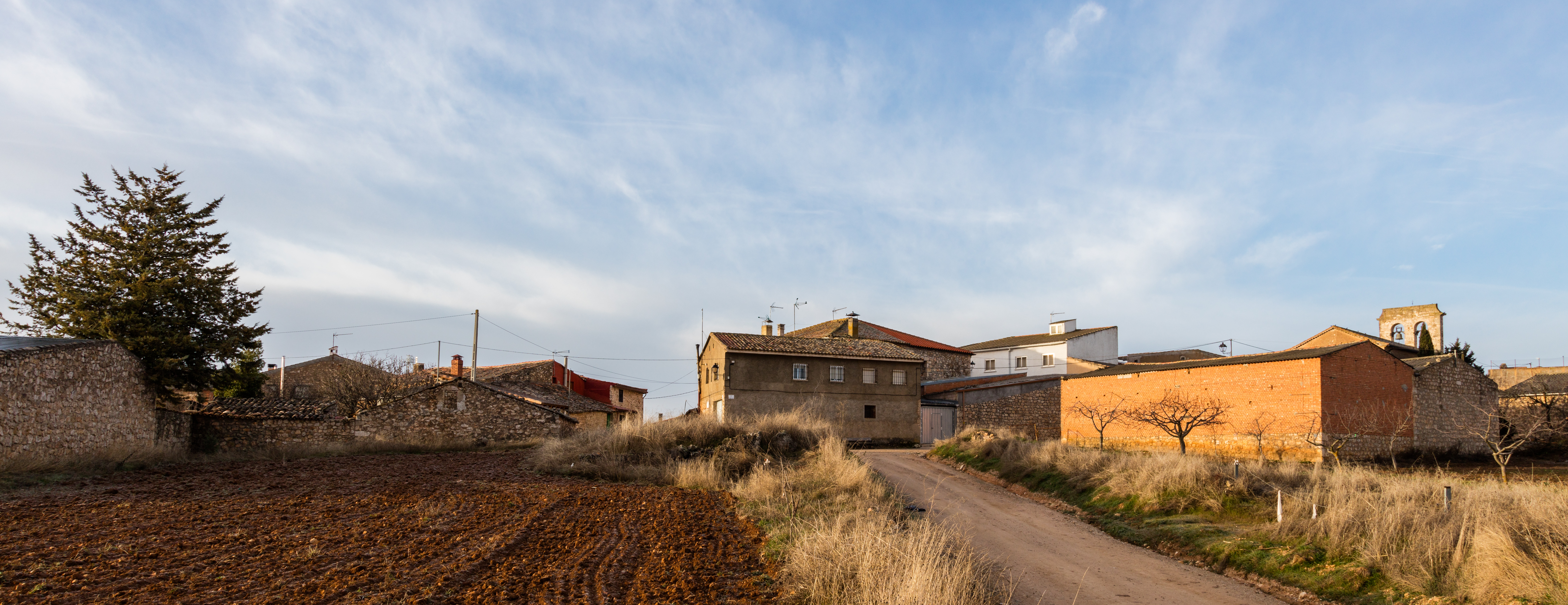

- Location in Spain Alaminos (Castilla-La Mancha) Alaminos (Spain)
- Coordinates: 40°51′50″N 2°43′29″W
- Country: Spain
- Autonomous community: Castile-La Mancha
- Province: Guadalajara
- Comarca: La Alcarria

Government
  - Alcalde: Manrique Foguet Pariente

Area
  - Total: 19.50 km^{2} (7.53 sq mi)

Population (2025-01-01)
  - Total: 54
  - Density: 2.8/km^{2} (7.2/sq mi)
- Time zone: UTC+1 (CET)
  - Summer (DST): UTC+2 (CEST)
- Postal code: 19490

Alaminos is a municipality in the province of Guadalajara, Castile-La Mancha, Spain. The municipality has 19.50 km^{2} and a population of 70 inhabitants, according to the 2013 census (INE).
