= Alaminos, Pangasinan =

Component city in Pangasinan, Philippines

Alaminos
- Component city
- City of Alaminos
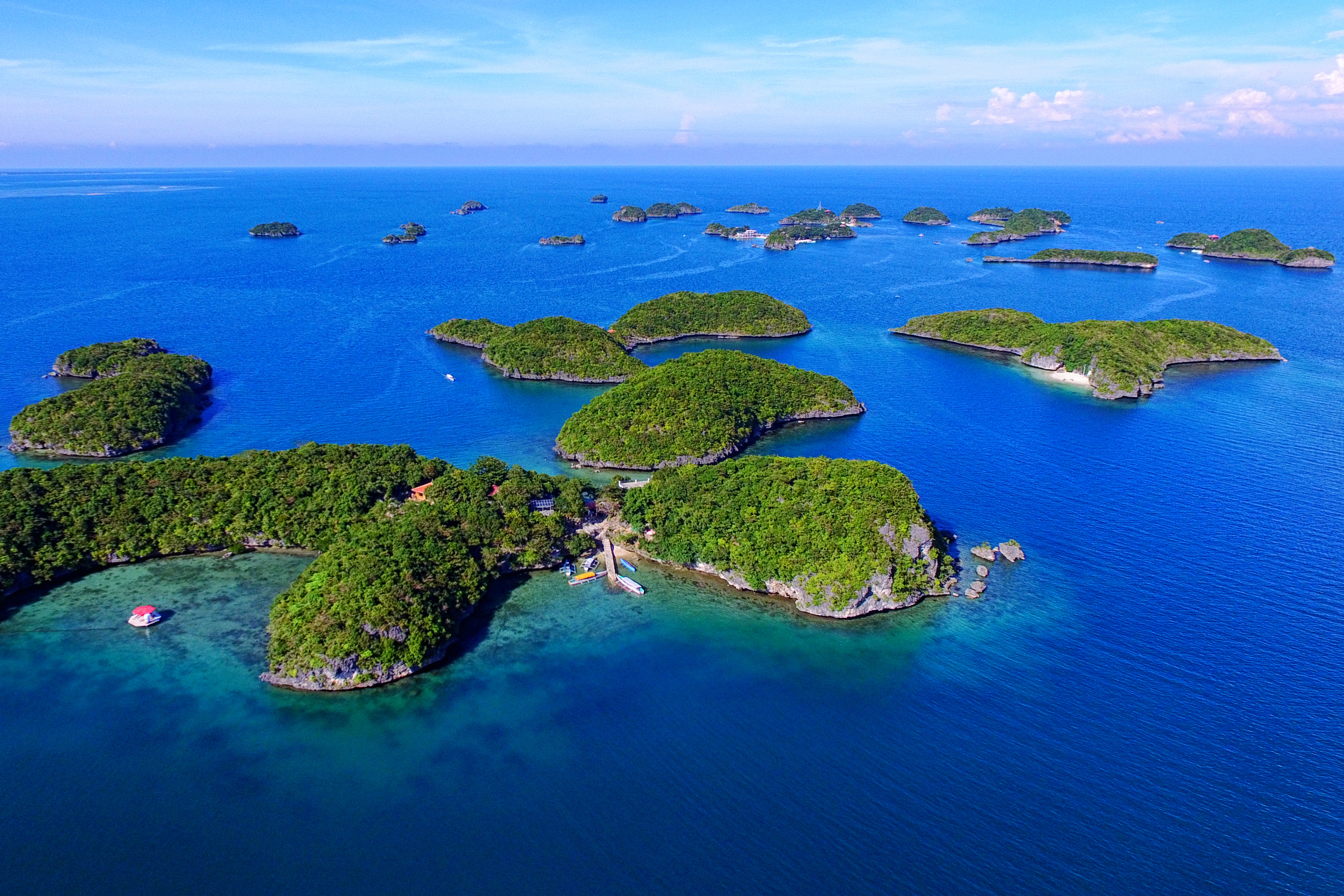
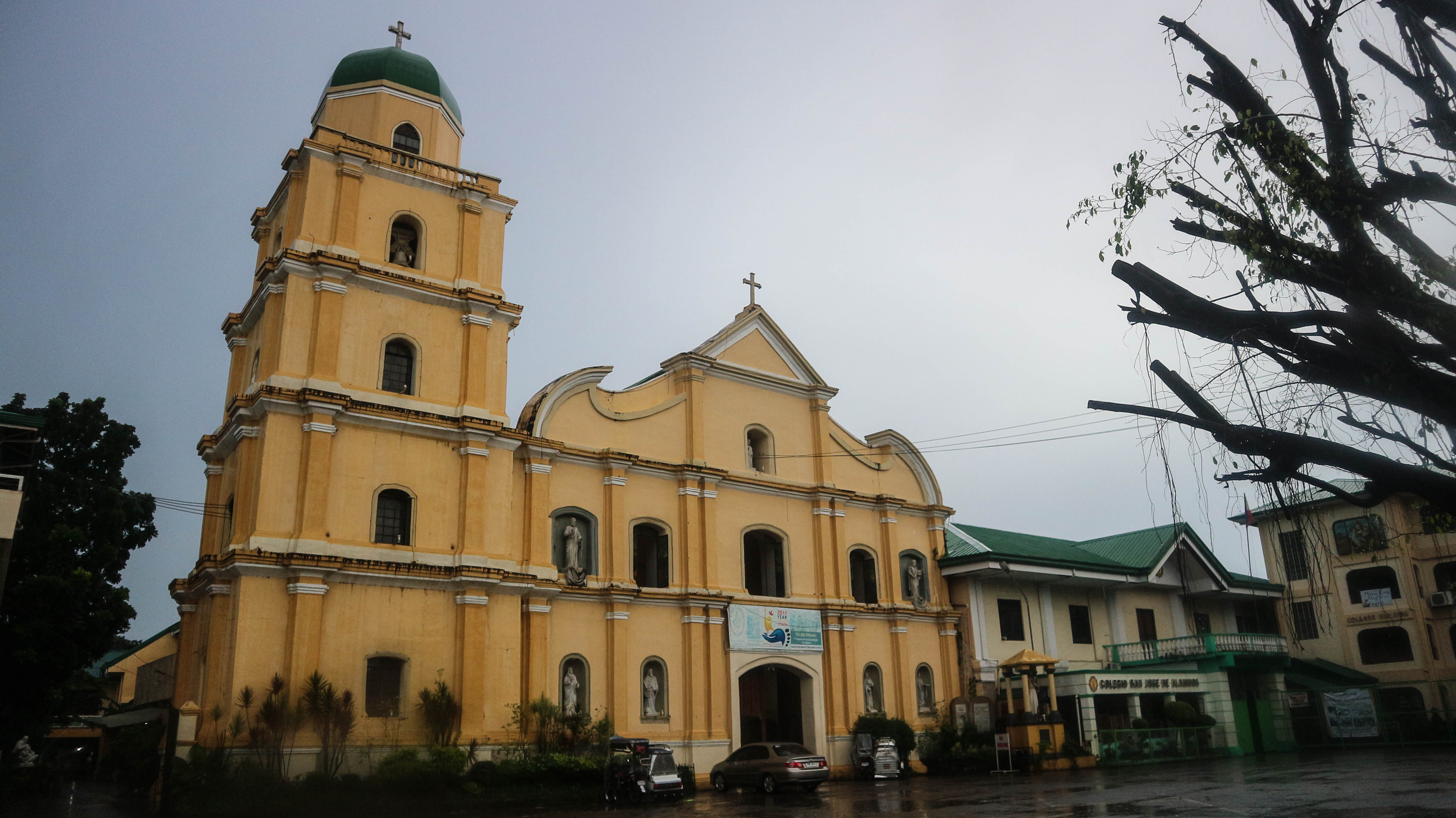
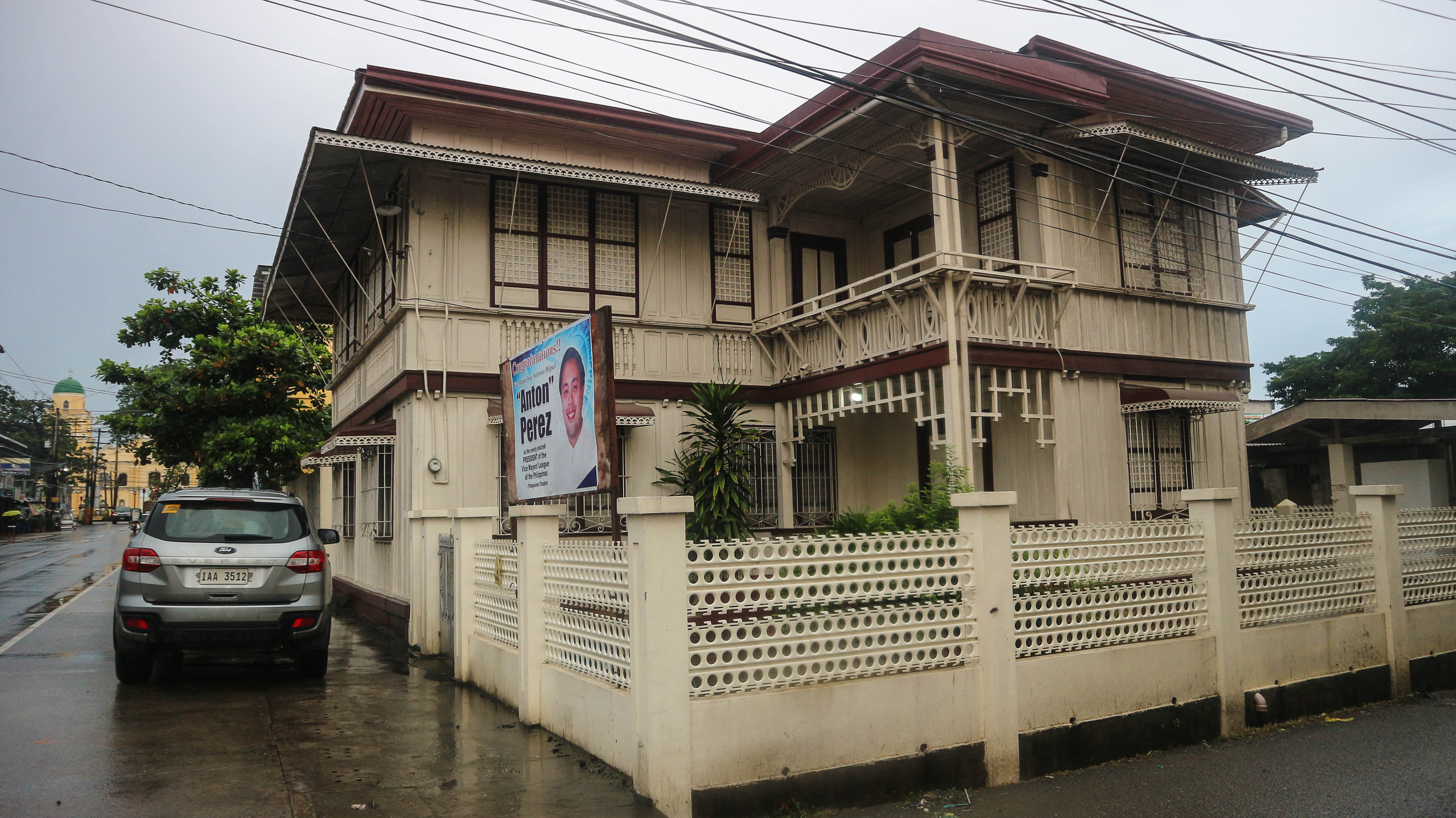
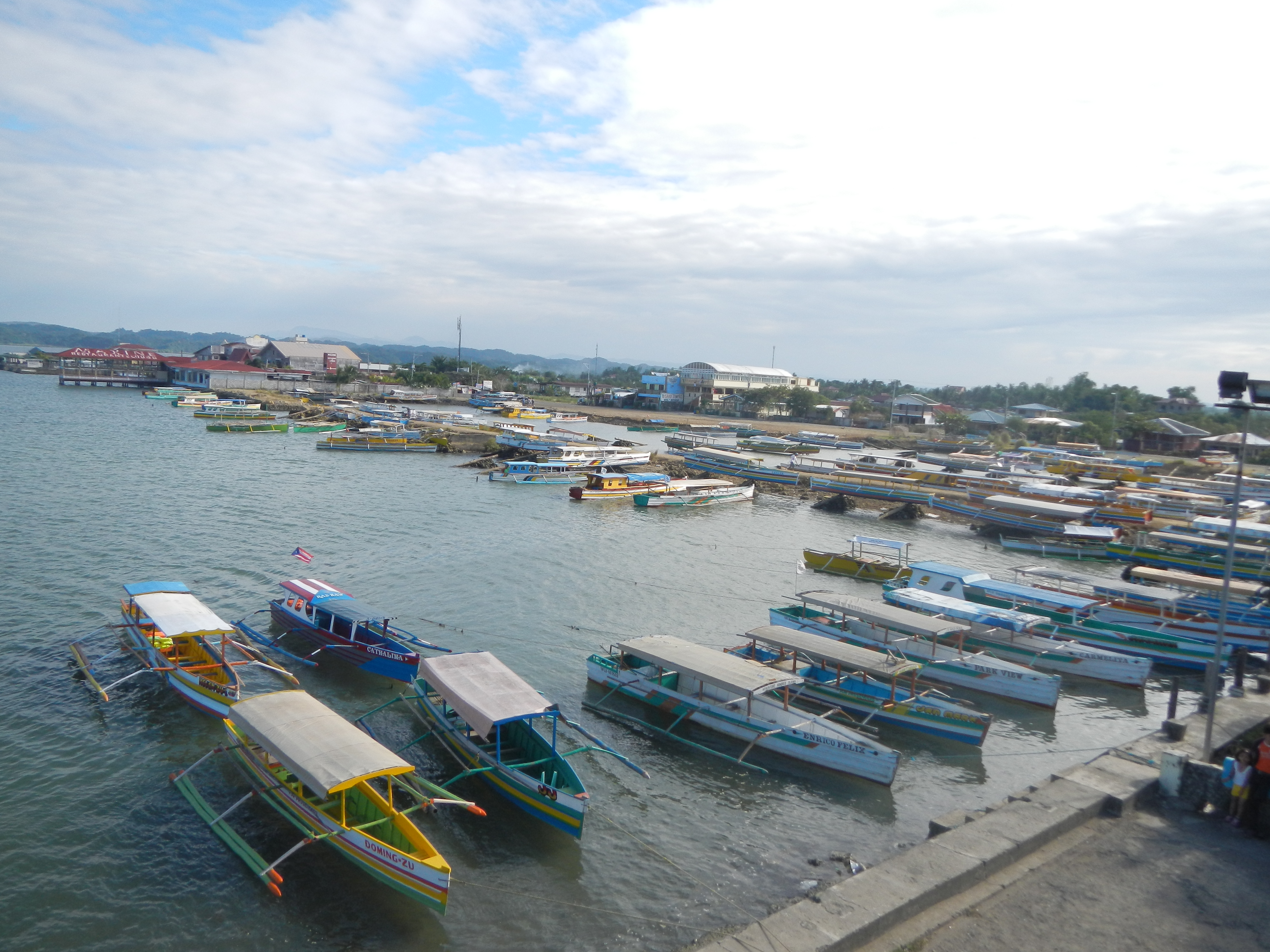
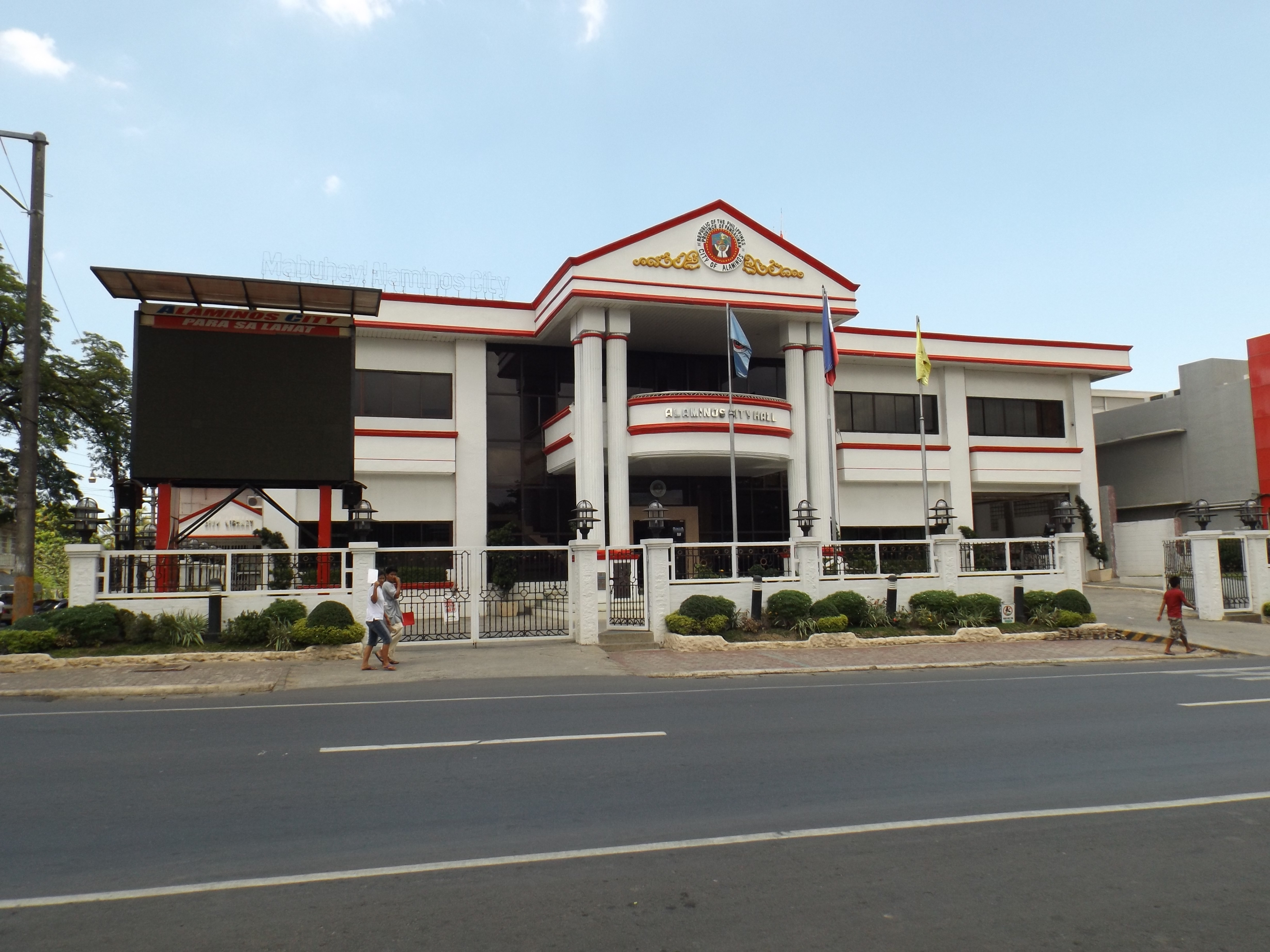
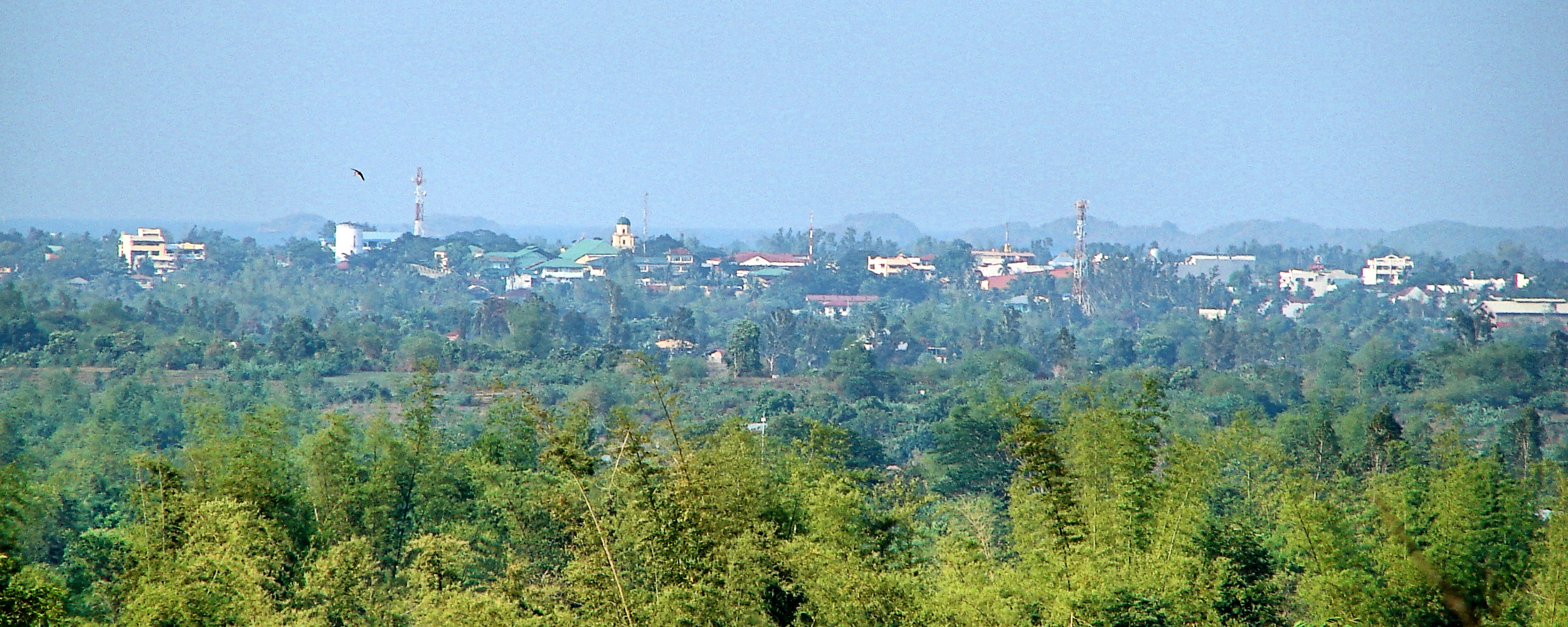
- Clockwise from top: Hundred Islands National Park; an Ancestral house in Poblacion area; Alaminos City Hall; Skyline of Alaminos City; Hundred Island Pier; and Saint Joseph the Patriarch Cathedral

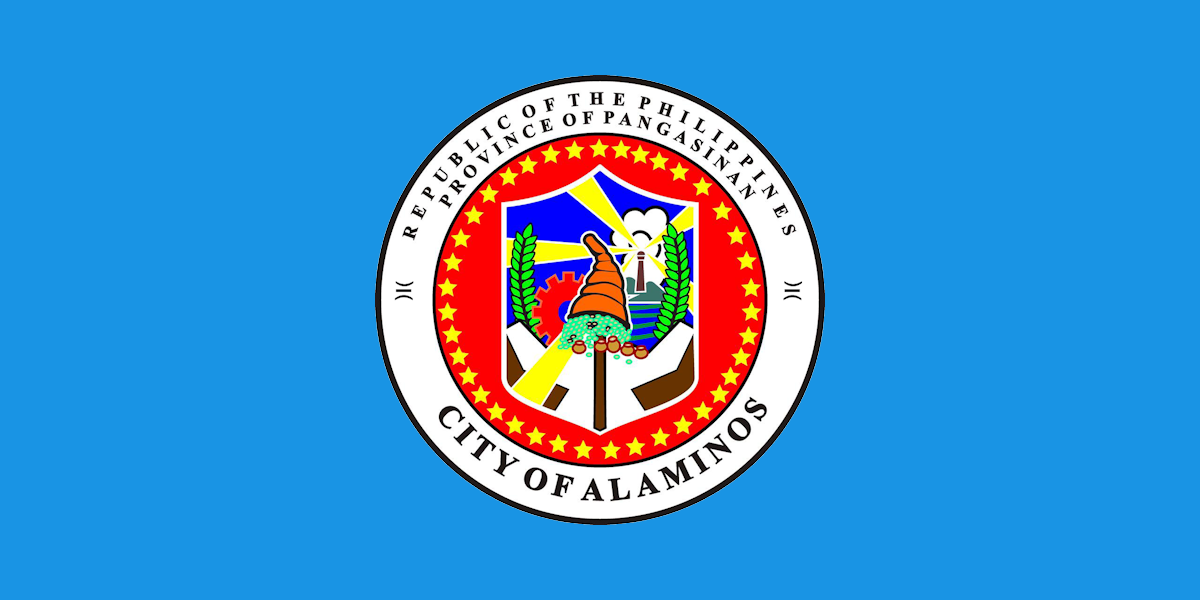
- Flag Seal
- Nickname: Home of the Hundred Islands
- Interactive map of Alaminos
- Location within the Philippines
- Coordinates: 16°09′19″N 119°58′51″E
- Country: Philippines
- Region: Ilocos Region
- Province: Pangasinan
- District: 1st district
- Founded: 1744
- Cityhood: March 28, 2001
- Named for: Juan Alaminos y Vivar
- Barangays: 39 (see Barangays)

Government
  - Type: Sangguniang Panlungsod
  - Mayor: Arth Bryan C. Celeste (NP)
  - Vice Mayor: Jose Antonio Miguel Y. Perez (NP)
  - Representative: Arthur F. Celeste (NP)
  - City Council: Members: Jan Marionne R. Fontelera (NP); Apple Joy Bacay-Tolentino (NP); Kelvin Theus O. Humilde (NP); Oscar A. Boling (NP); Raul B. Bacay (NP); Walter M. Macaiba (NP); Dahlia M. De Leon (NP); Krystle Nicole Dizon-Sison (NP); Verna SD. Rabago (NP); Cirilo B. Radoc (API)
  - Electorate: 62,721 voters (2025)

Area
  - Total: 164.26 km^{2} (63.42 sq mi)
- Elevation: 14 m (46 ft)
- Highest elevation: 760 m (2,490 ft)
- Lowest elevation: 0 m (0 ft)

Population (2024 census)
  - Total: 100,430
  - Density: 611.41/km^{2} (1,583.5/sq mi)
  - Households: 25,195

Economy
  - Income class: 3rd city income class
  - Poverty incidence: 10.38% (2023)
  - Revenue: ₱ 1,159 million (2024)
  - Assets: ₱ 3,530 million (2024)
  - Expenditure: ₱ 987.6 million (2024)
  - Liabilities: ₱ 731 million (2024)

Service provider
  - Electricity: Pangasinan 1 Electric Cooperative (PANELCO 1)
- Time zone: UTC+8 (PST)
- ZIP code: 2404
- PSGC: 015503000
- IDD : area code: +63 (0)75
- Native languages: Pangasinan; Ilocano; Tagalog; Sambal
- Website: www.alaminoscity.gov.ph

Alaminos, officially the City of Alaminos (Pangasinan: Siyudad na Alaminos; Ilocano: Siudad ti Alaminos; Sambal: Babali nin Alaminos; Filipino: Lungsod ng Alaminos), is a component city in the province of Pangasinan, Philippines. According to the 2024 census, it has a population of 100,430 people.

It is known for being the home of the Hundred Islands National Park, composed of 124 islands located off the coast of Barangay Lucap.

== Etymology ==
Alaminos is named after the Spanish general Juan Alaminos y Vivar, who served as Governor-General of the Philippines from 1873 to 1874 and was much loved by locals as he visited the then-town in 1860. Previously named Sarapsap, it was renamed in his honor in 1872.

== History ==
Alaminos was formerly part of Bolinao. It traces its roots to a barrio named Casborran (present-day barangay Baleyadaan), formerly part of Zambales. It eventually grew when people from Suyang (present-day barangay Zaragosa in Bolinao) relocated to the area in 1737.

In 1747, Casborran became an independent town. In 1758, it was razed by fire due to a political and economic conflict. In 1764, inhabitants tried to rebuild the town, but another conflict happened, making them leave for Nansangaan (present-day Barangay Inerangan). Two years later, they found refuge at a plateau in what is now the poblacion of Alaminos and renamed it Sarapsap. Ilocano settlers from Paoay, Ilocos Norte moved and stayed in the town, increasing the small population of the town in 1830.

It was renamed Alaminos in 1872, 12 years after the visit of the future Governor-General Juan Alaminos y Vivar, who was well loved by residents, to the thriving town.

On October 15, 1903, by virtue of Act No. 945, while still part of the Province of Zambales, the municipality of Alaminos was consolidated with the municipality of Alos, with the seat of the municipal government remaining at Alaminos.

On November 30, 1903, by virtue of Act No. 1004, the municipalities of Bolinao, Alaminos, San Isidro, and Infanta were annexed to the Province of Pangasinan.

On December 19, 1903, by virtue of Act No. 1029, Act No. 1004 was amended to include the municipalities of Anda, Bani, and Agno among those annexed to the Province of Pangasinan.

The Communist Party of the Philippines was founded by Jose Maria Sison in the remote barangay of Dulacac on December 26, 1968.

=== Cityhood ===
By virtue of Republic Act 9025, signed by President Gloria Macapagal Arroyo on March 5, 2001, Alaminos was converted into a city after 85% of the voters favored the ratification in a plebiscite held on March 28, 2001.

=== Contemporary era ===
Alaminos was badly hit in May 2009 by Typhoon Emong which damaged many houses in the city, including the roof of the main church.

== Geography ==
Alaminos is situated 38.14 kilometres (23.70 mi) from the provincial capital Lingayen, and 247.07 kilometres (153.52 mi) from the country's capital city of Manila. It also borders the towns of Bani in the northwest, Sual to the southeast, and Mabini to the southwest.

=== Barangays ===
Alaminos City is politically subdivided into 39 barangays. Each barangay consists of puroks and some have sitios.

- Alos
- Amandiego
- Amangbangan
- Balangobong
- Balayang
- Bisocol
- Bolaney
- Baleyadaan
- Bued
- Cabatuan
- Cayucay
- Dulacac
- Inerangan
- Landoc
- Linmansangan
- Lucap
- Maawi
- Macatiw
- Magsaysay
- Mona
- Palamis
- Pandan
- Pangapisan
- Poblacion
- Pocal-Pocal
- Pogo
- Polo
- Quibuar
- Sabangan
- San Antonio
- San Jose
- San Roque
- San Vicente
- Santa Maria
- Tanaytay
- Tangcarang
- Tawintawin
- Telbang
- Victoria

=== Climate ===
Climate data for Alaminos
Month	Jan	Feb	Mar	Apr	May	Jun	Jul	Aug	Sep	Oct	Nov	Dec	Year
Mean daily maximum °C (°F)	31 (88)	31 (88)	33 (91)	34 (93)	34 (93)	33 (91)	32 (90)	31 (88)	31 (88)	32 (90)	31 (88)	31 (88)	32 (90)
Mean daily minimum °C (°F)	21 (70)	21 (70)	23 (73)	25 (77)	25 (77)	25 (77)	25 (77)	24 (75)	24 (75)	24 (75)	23 (73)	22 (72)	24 (74)
Average rainfall mm (inches)	4.3 (0.17)	19.1 (0.75)	27.3 (1.07)	45.2 (1.78)	153.3 (6.04)	271.3 (10.68)	411.1 (16.19)	532 (20.9)	364.4 (14.35)	182.5 (7.19)	56.3 (2.22)	24.4 (0.96)	2,091.2 (82.3)
Average rainy days	3	2	3	5	14	17	22	23	21	13	7	4	134
Source: World Weather Online (modeled/calculated data, not measured locally)

== Demographics ==
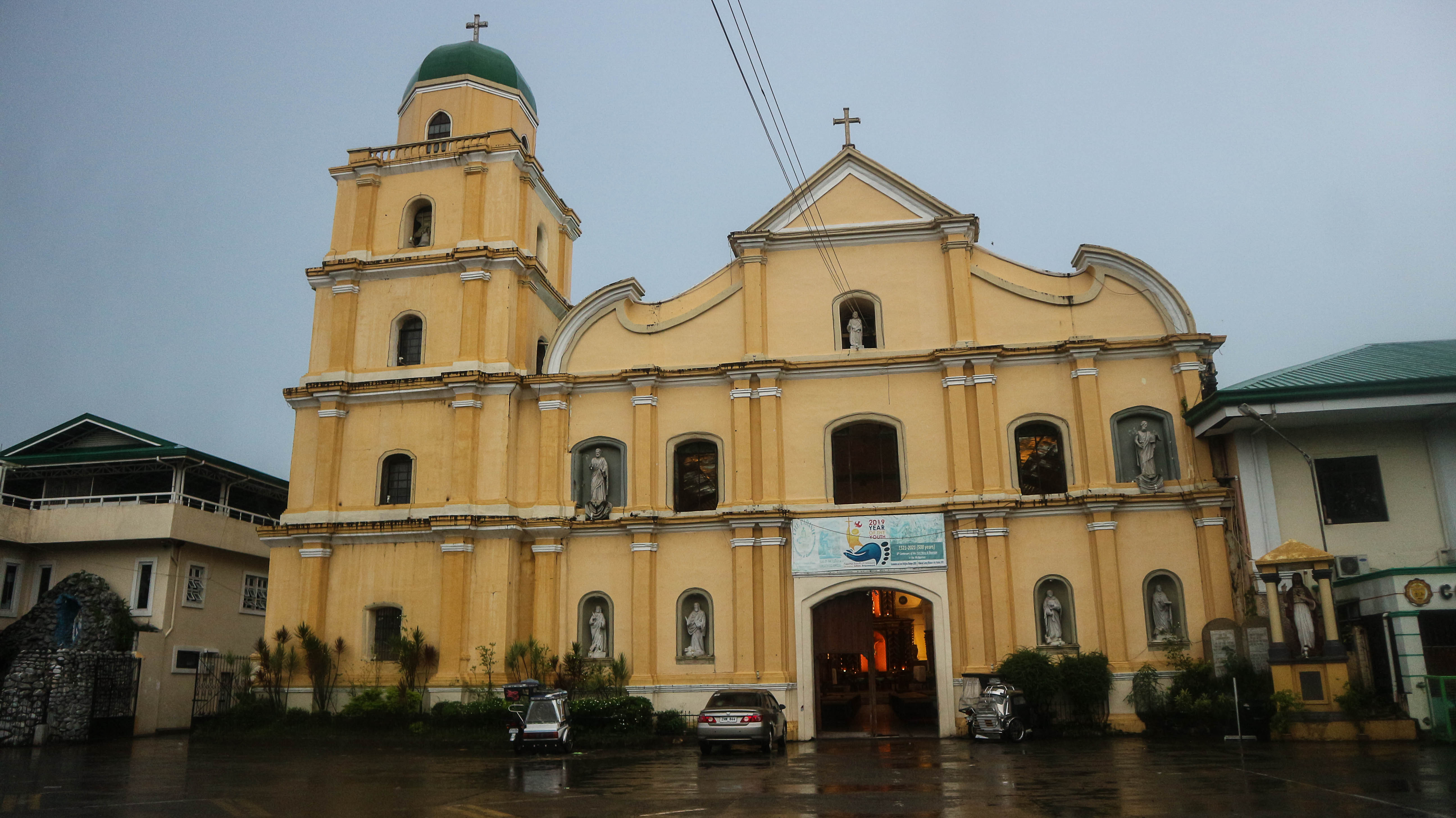
Cathedral of Saint Joseph (Poblacion)

Population census of Alaminos

Year	Pop.	±% p.a.
1903	11,834	—
1918	14,353	+1.29%
1939	19,960	+1.58%
1948	26,240	+3.09%
1960	30,250	+1.19%
1970	38,773	+2.51%

Year	Pop.	±% p.a.
1975	42,496	+1.86%
1980	47,715	+2.34%
1990	59,363	+2.21%
1995	65,130	+1.75%
2000	73,448	+2.61%
2007	79,788	+1.15%

Year	Pop.	±% p.a.
2010	85,025	+2.34%
2015	89,708	+1.03%
2020	99,397	+2.18%
2024	100,430	+0.25%

Source: Philippine Statistics Authority

=== Languages ===
Pangasinan and Ilocano are the main languages of Alaminos.

== Economy ==
Poverty incidence of Alaminos

Source: Philippine Statistics Authority

== Government ==
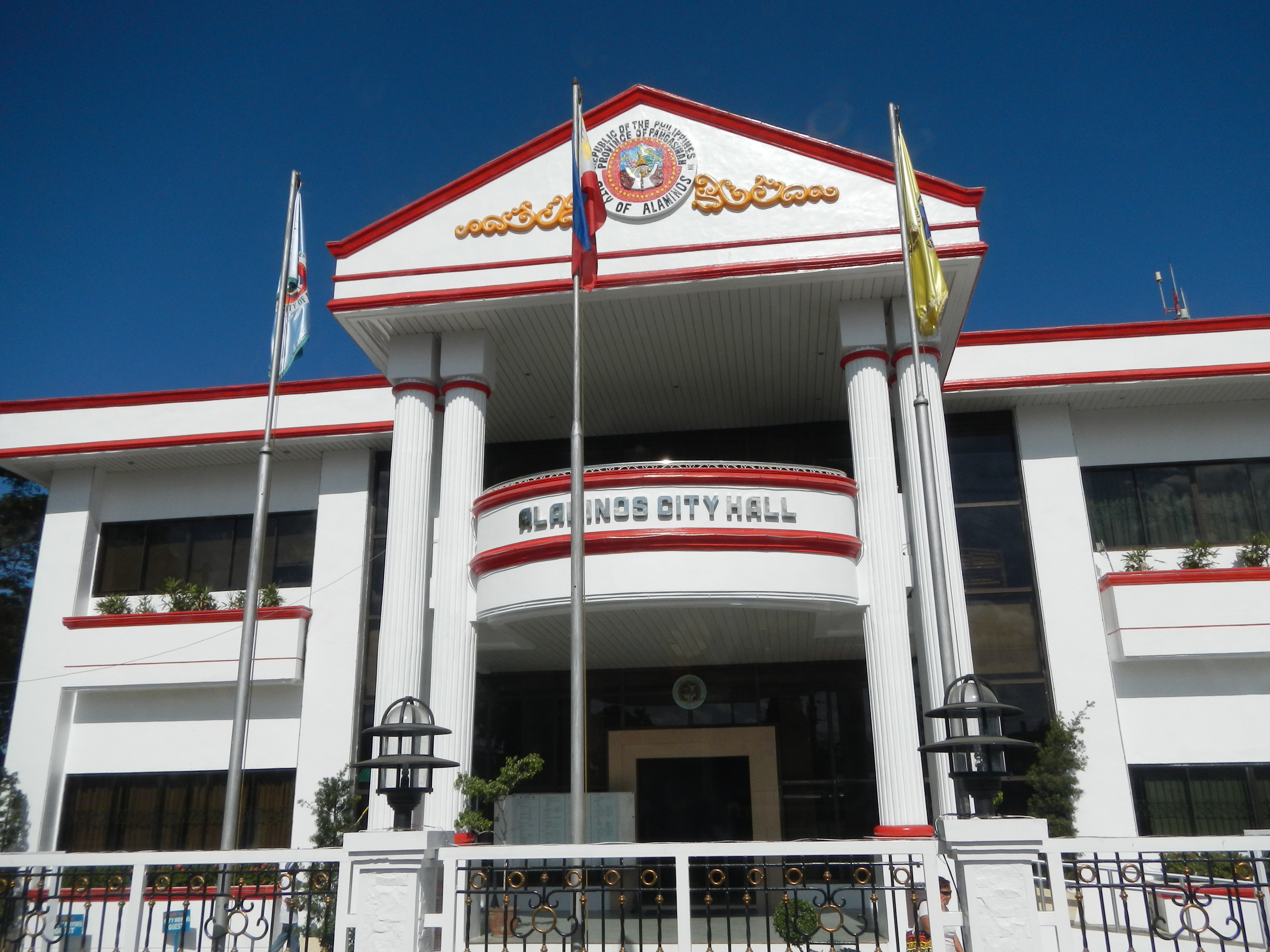
Alaminos City Hall (Poblacion)

=== Local government ===
Alaminos, belonging to the first congressional district of the province of Pangasinan, is governed by a mayor designated as its local chief executive and by a municipal council as its legislative body in accordance with the Local Government Code. The mayor, vice mayor, and the councilors are elected directly by the people through an election which is being held every three years.

=== Elected officials ===
Members of the Alaminos City Government (2025-2028)
Position	Name
Congressman	Arthur F. Celeste (NP)
City Mayor	Arth Bryan C. Celeste (NP)
City Vice-Mayor	Jose Antonio Miguel Y. Perez (NP)
City Councilors	Jan Marionne R. Fontelera (NP)
City Councilors	Apple Joy Bacay-Tolentino (NP)
City Councilors	Kelvin Theus O. Humilde (NP)
City Councilors	Oscar A. Boling (NP)
City Councilors	Raul B. Bacay (NP)
City Councilors	Walter M. Macaiba (NP)
City Councilors	Dahlia M. De Leon (NP)
City Councilors	Krystle Nicole Dizon-Sison (NP)
City Councilors	Verna S. Rabago (NP)
City Councilors	Cirilo B. Radoc (API)

== Festivals ==
The Galila Hundred Islands Festival is held from March 16 to 21 every year. Galila means “come” in the vernacular, and the festival includes the 100 Islands Adventure Race.

== Transportation ==
Alaminos is between Sual and Mabini on the Olongapo–Bugallon Road.

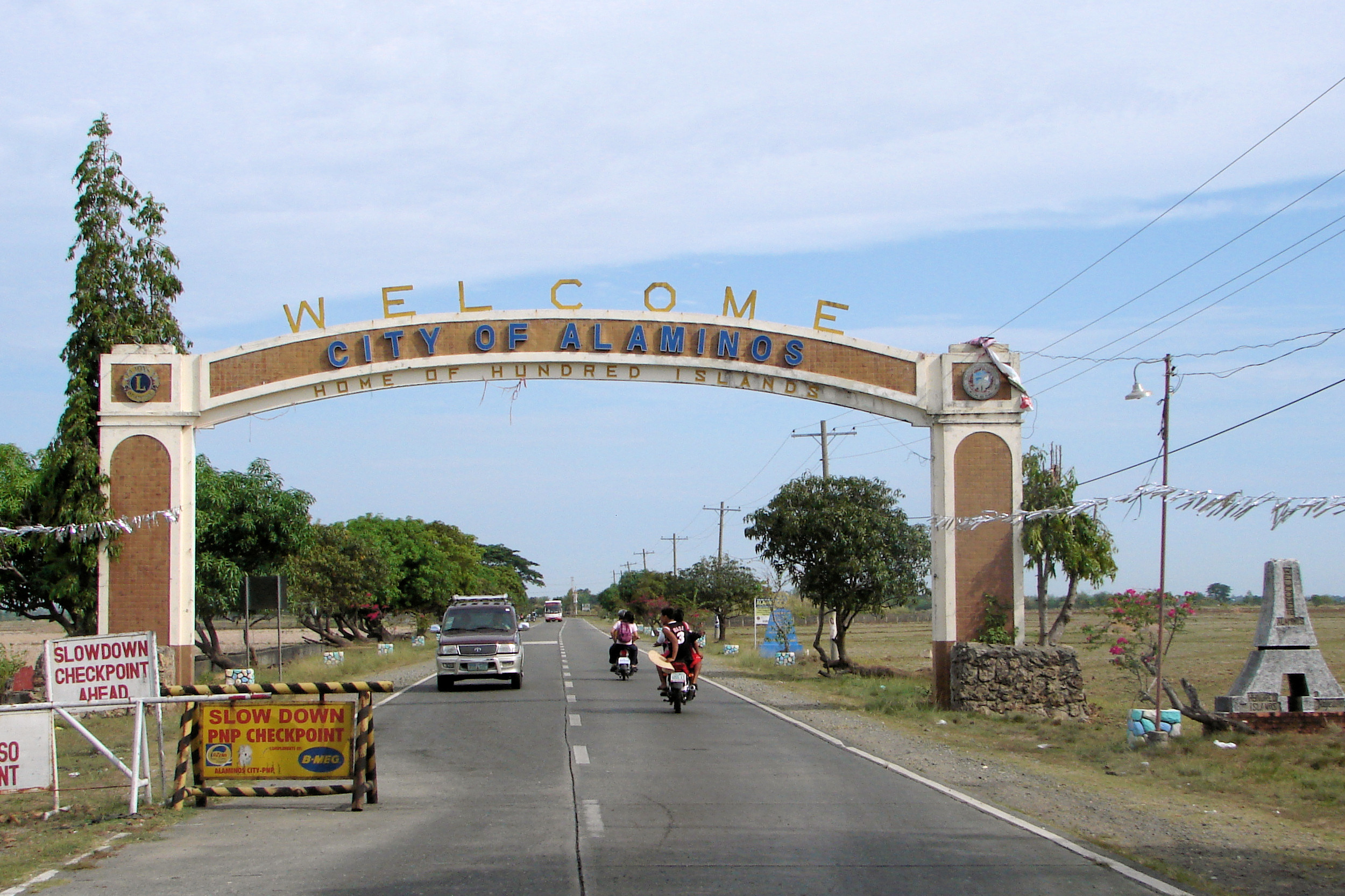
Welcome sign

Accredited Transport Cooperative as of January 2021:

- Alaminos, Bani, Agno, Anda, Bolinao Operators and Drivers Transport Service Cooperative (ABAABOD TSC)

In 2009, it was announced that Alaminos Airport would be built near the city as a commercial airport for Pangasinan province. However, the timeline for construction of the airport has repeatedly come and gone. As of 2015, the project remains to be in its pendency.

== Education ==
The Alaminos City Schools Division Office governs all educational institutions within the municipality. It oversees the management and operations of all private and public, from primary to secondary schools. There are three schools district offices under this division office namely, District I, District II, and District III.

=== Primary and elementary schools ===
- 100 Island Cowboy Christian Learning Center
- Alaminos Adventist Multigrade School
- Alaminos City Central School
- Alaminos City Maxim Heritage Academy
- Alos Elementary School
- Amandiego Elementary School
- Amangbangan Elementary School
- Balangobong Elementary School
- Balayang Elementary School
- Baleyadaan Elementary School
- Bisocol Elementary School
- Bolaney Elementary School
- Bued Elementary School
- Cabatuan Elementary School
- Cayucay Elementary School
- Dulacac Elementary School
- Ednas School of Alaminos
- Inerangan Elementary School
- Landoc Elementary School
- Linmansangan Elementary School
- Longos Elementary School
- Lucap Elementary School
- Maawi Elementary School
- Magsaysay Elementary School
- Maliga Elementary School
- Mona Elementary School
- Palamis Elementary School
- Pandan Elementary School
- PBCC School
- Pogo Elementary School
- Polo Elementary School
- Popantay Elementary School
- Precious Angels Christian School
- Quibuar Elementary School
- Sabangan Elementary School
- San Jose Elementary School
- San Roque Elementary School
- San Vicente Elementary School
- Shekinah Grace School
- Sta. Maria Elementary School
- Tangcarang Elementary School
- Telbang Elementary School
- Tawintawin Elementary School
- UMC Values School
- Victoria Elementary School

=== Secondary schools ===
- Alaminos City National High School
- Alos National High School
- Cayucay National High School
- ELR Westville Integrated School
- Ildefonso Quimson Community High School
- Inerangan National High School
- Mary the Queen Educational Foundation
- Pangapisan Integrated School
- Polo National High School
- San Vicente National High School
- Telbang National High School

=== Higher educational institutions ===
- Colegio San Jose de Alaminos
- Golden West Colleges
- PASS College
- STI Alaminos
- The Great Plebeian College
- Pangasinan State University - ACC

== Media ==
AM Stations:

- DZIN 801 (DZIN; Vanguard Radio Network)
- Radyo Totoo 864 (DZWM; Catholic Media Network)

FM Stations:

- 99.3 Spirit FM (DWTJ; Catholic Media Network)
- 100.1 Radyo Natin (DWSF; Manila Broadcasting Company)
- 103.5 Big Sound FM (DWOH; Vanguard Radio Network)

Cable & Satellite TV Providers

- Pangasinan Educational Cable TV (PECTV)
- USATV
- Cignal TV
- G Sat

== Sister cities ==
- Marikina, Metro Manila
