= Lingayen Gulf =

Extension of the South China Sea on Luzon in the Philippines

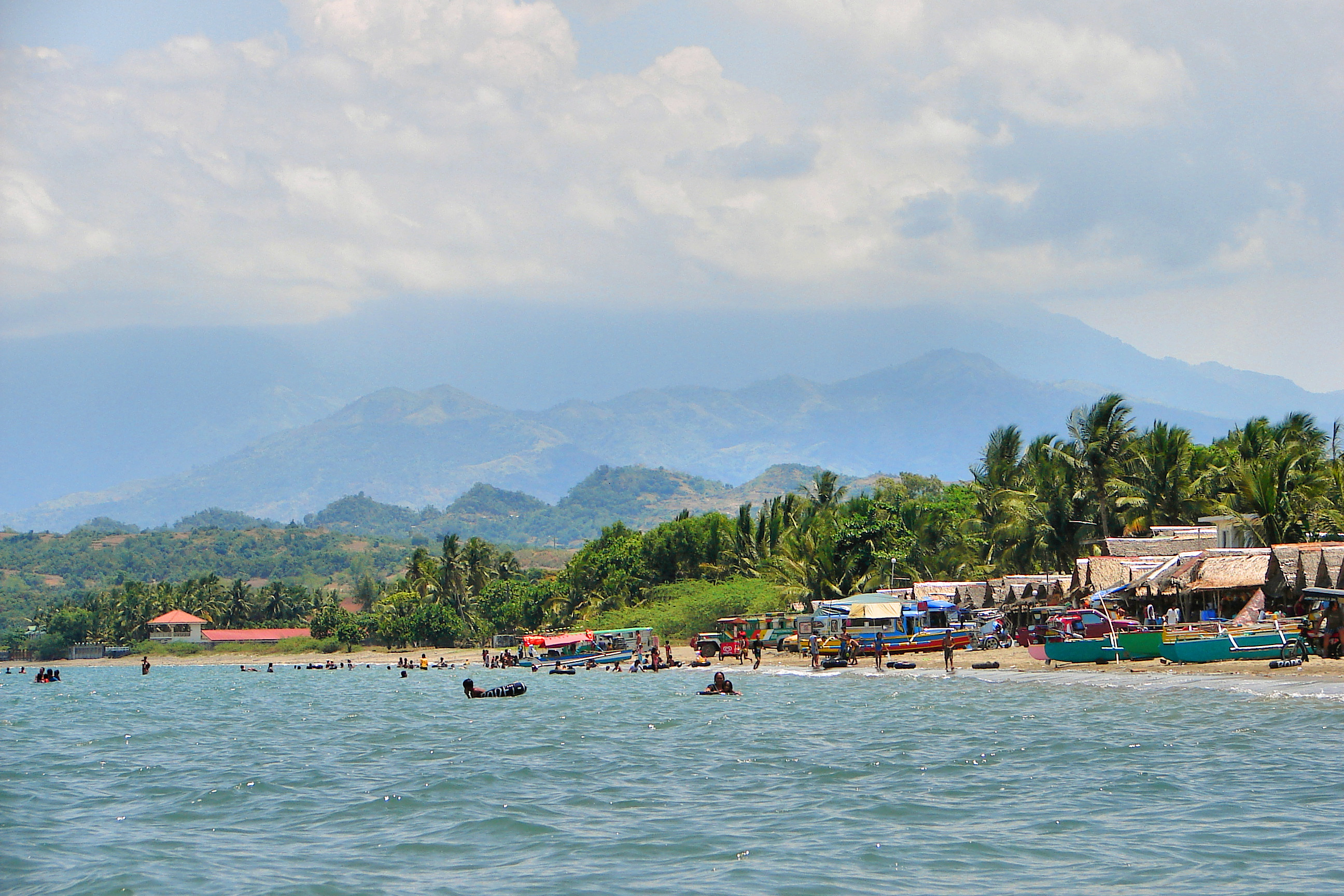
- Lingayen Gulf at San Fabian, Pangasinan, with the Cordillera Central mountains in the background.

- Location within Philippines
- Location: Ilocos Region, Philippines
- Coordinates: 16°17′N 120°12′E
- Type: gulf
- River sources: Agno River; Aringay River; Bauang River; Dagupan River; Angalacan-Bued River
- Max. length: 55 km (34 mi)
- Max. width: 35 km (22 mi)
- Settlements: Agoo, Alaminos, Anda, Aringay, Bani, Bauang, Binmaley, Bolinao, Caba, Dagupan, Labrador, Lingayen, Rosario, San Fabian, San Fernando (La Union), Santo Tomas, Sual

Lingayen Gulf is a large gulf on northwestern Luzon in the Philippines, stretching 56 km (35 mi). It is framed by the provinces of Pangasinan and La Union and sits between the Zambales Mountains and the Cordillera Central. The Agno River and the Balili River drain into Lingayen Gulf.

== Geography ==
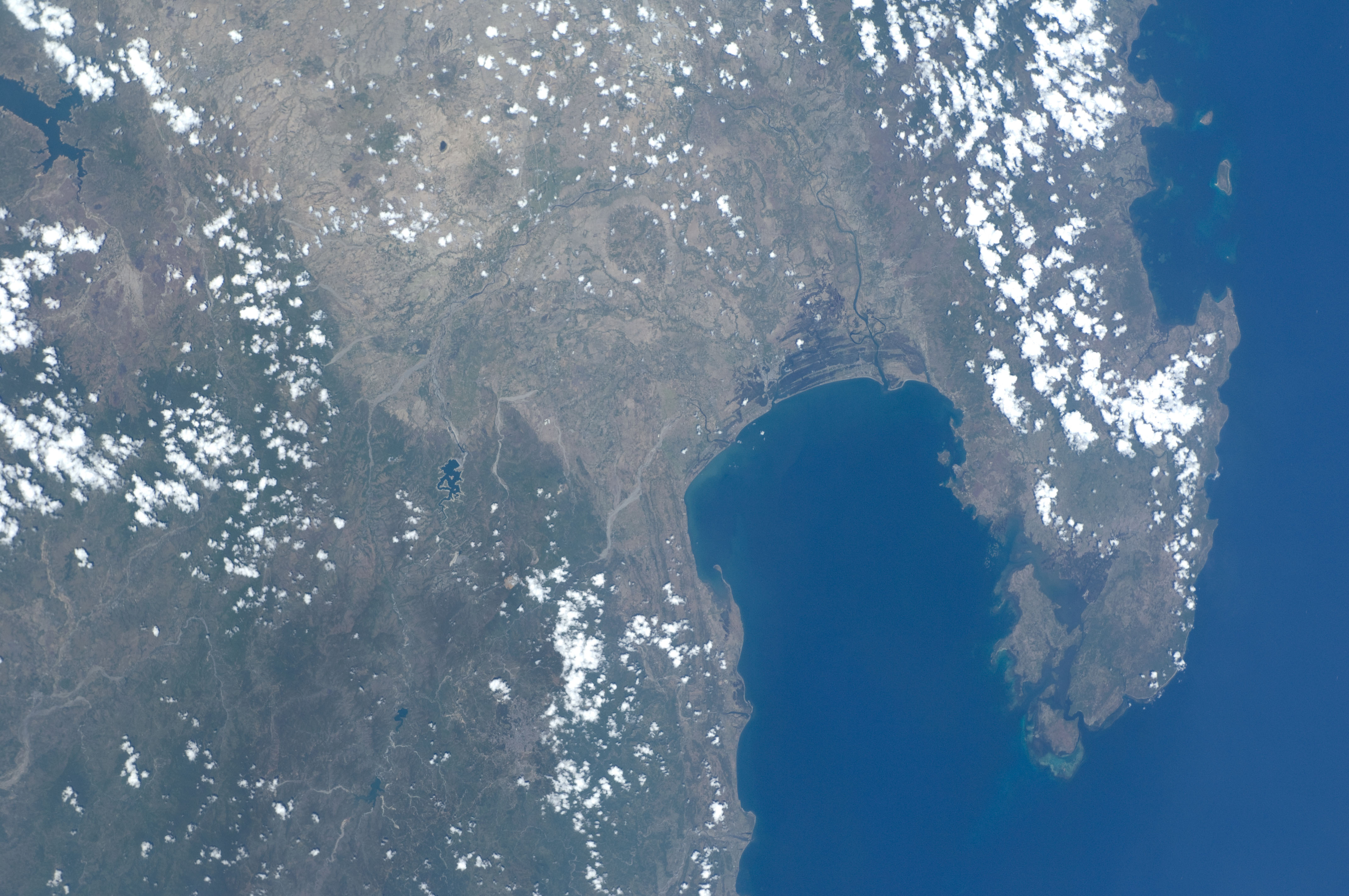
Satellite image of Lingayen Gulf viewed from the north

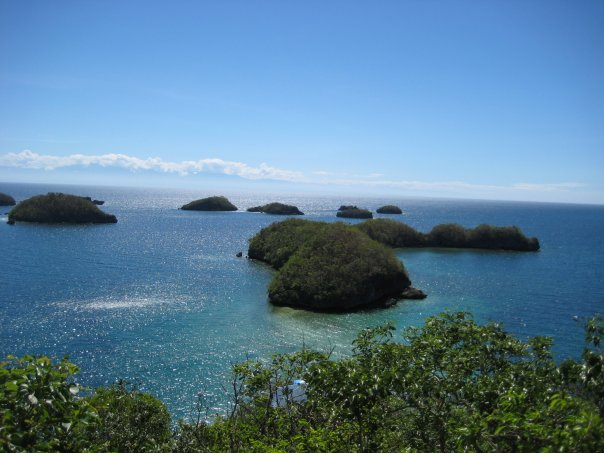
Hundred Islands National Park

The gulf has numerous islands, the most famous of which are in the Hundred Islands National Park. This tourist attraction features 123 islands, the majority of which are small in size. The largest island is Cabarruyan Island, which constitutes the municipality of Anda, Pangasinan, followed by Santiago Island at the mouth of the Gulf.

The shore from Labrador to San Fabian is characterized by a long grey-sand beach. Other well-known beaches are at Bonuan-Tondaligan, Bolinao and San Fernando City. The waters of Lingayen Gulf are murky due to its sandy bottom. Coral reefs were all but destroyed by dynamite fishing, although efforts are made to restore some, especially inside the Hundred Islands National Park.

A number of cities are found along the gulf's coast such as Dagupan and Alaminos in Pangasinan, and San Fernando City, the capital of La Union. Lingayen, the capital of Pangasinan, also lies on the shores of the gulf.

=== River sources ===
The gulf has five major river sources. Flowing from the province of Pangasinan in the south are the Agno, Dagupan and Angalacan-Bued rivers. From the east in the province of La Union flow the Aringay and Bauang rivers.

== History ==
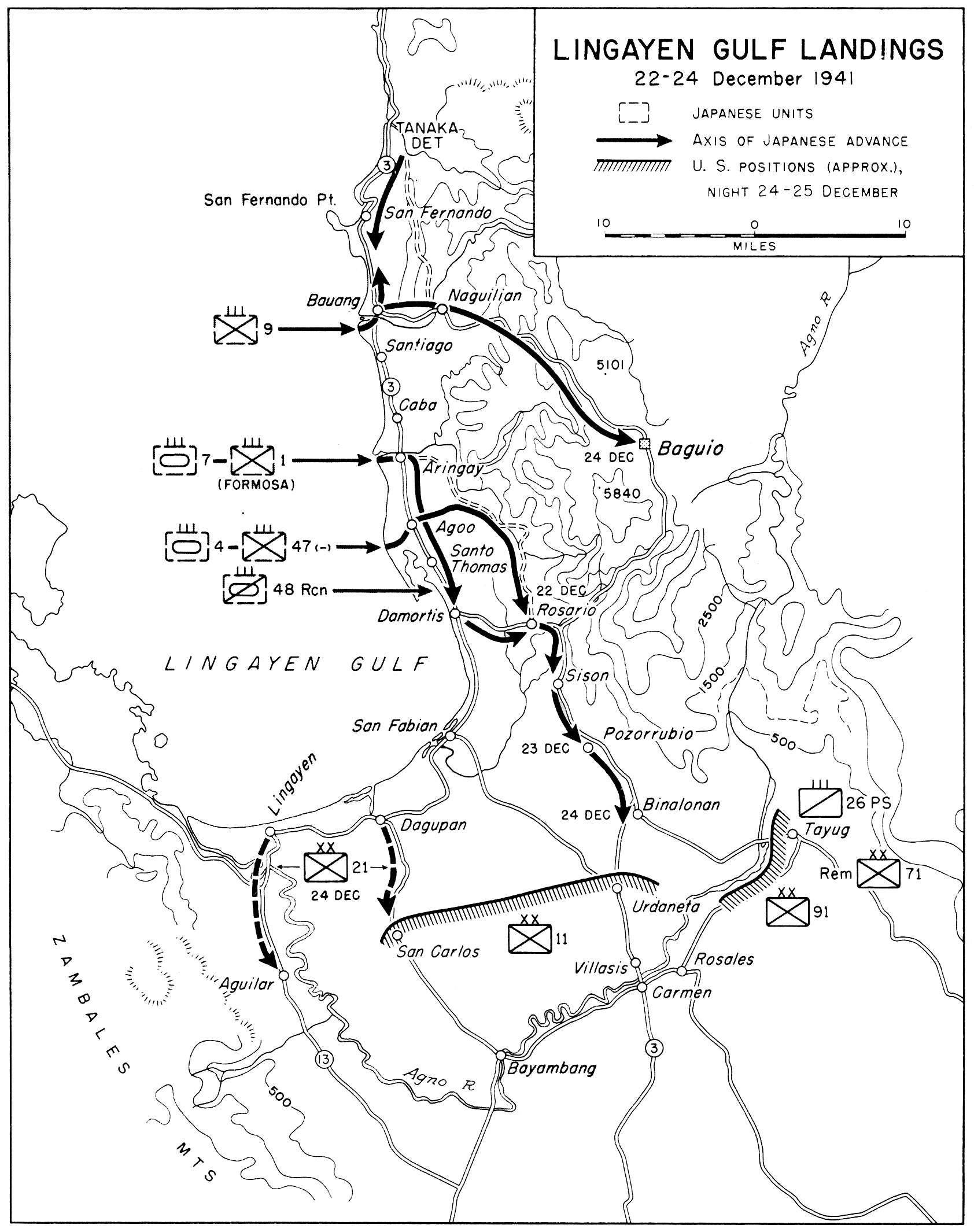
Lingayen Gulf landings and Japanese advance, 22–24 December 1941

During World War II, Lingayen Gulf proved a strategically important theatre of war between American and Japanese forces. On 22 December 1941, the Japanese 14th Army under Lieutenant General Masaharu Homma landed on the eastern part of the gulf at San Fernando City, Bauang, Santiago, Caba, Aringay, Agoo, and Santo Tomas, where they engaged in a number of relatively minor skirmishes with the defenders, a poorly equipped contingent of predominantly Filipino and American troops, and managed to successfully invade and occupy the gulf. Following the defeat, the next day General MacArthur issued the order to retreat from Luzon and withdraw to Bataan. For the next three years, the gulf remained under Japanese occupation prior to the Lingayen Gulf landings.

At 09:30 on 9 January 1945, the U.S. 6th Army conducted an amphibious landing on the gulf, following a devastating naval bombardment, with 68,000 troops landing on the first day alone, and a total of 203,608 in following landings along a 20 mi (32 km) beachhead, stretching from Sual, Lingayen, and Dagupan (XIV Corps) in the west, and San Fabian (I Corps) into the east.

Despite the Americans' success in driving out the Japanese army encamped at the gulf, the Americans suffered relatively heavy losses, particularly on their convoys due to Japanese kamikaze suicide attacks. From 13 December 1944 through 13 January 1945, a total of 24 ships were sunk and 67 damaged by kamikaze planes, including the battleships USS Mississippi and Colorado (accidentally hit by friendly fire), the heavy cruiser USS Louisville, the light cruiser USS Columbia, and the minesweepers USS Long and Hovey.

Following the amphibious landings, Lingayen Gulf was turned into a vast supply depot for the rest of the war to support the American and Filipino assaults on Manila and the rest of Luzon, and from there to Okinawa.

=== Commemoration ===
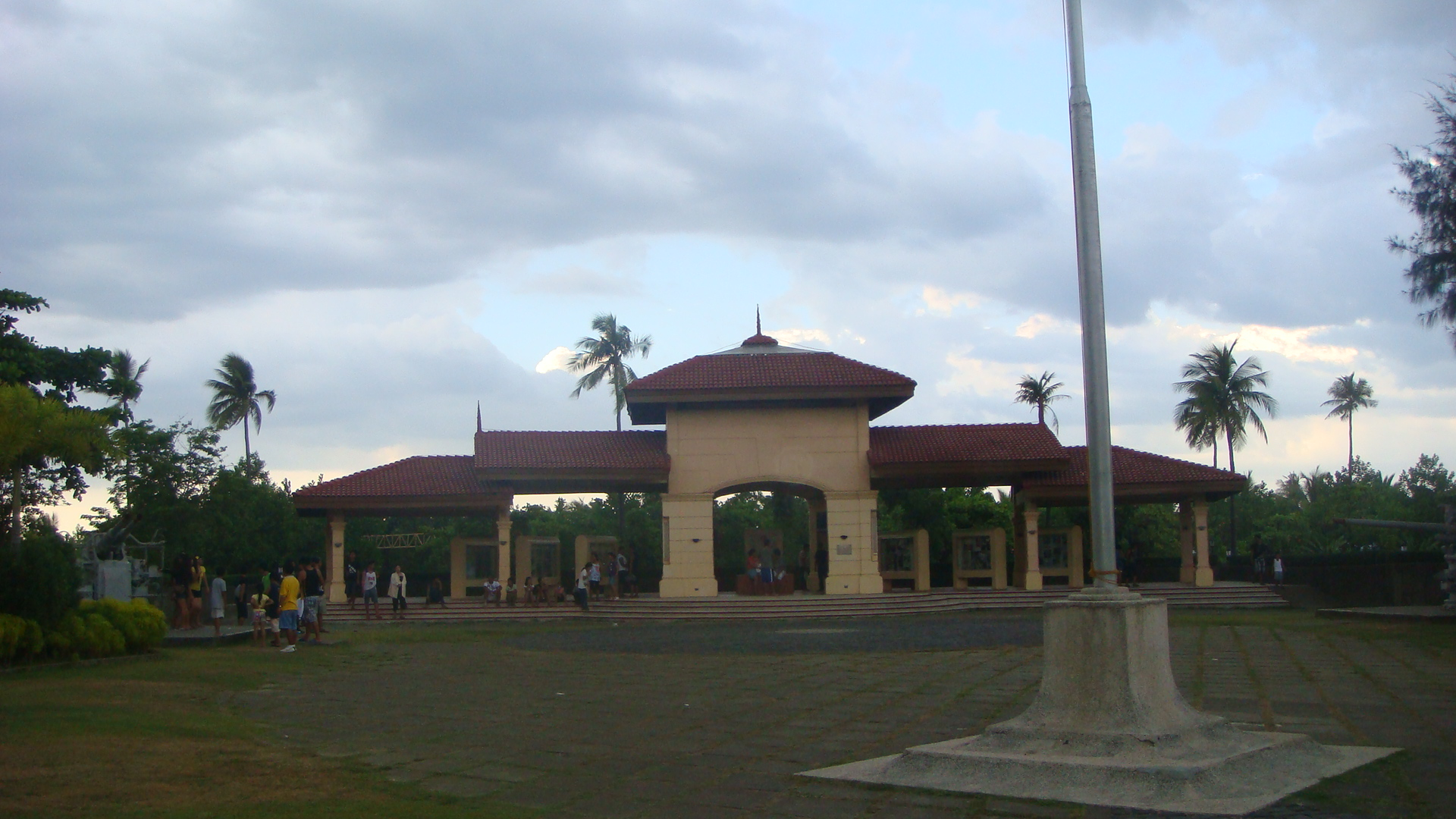
World War II Memorial Ground Site, Town Park & Capitol Grounds (Lingayen, Pangasinan).

On January 9, 2008, Gov. Amado Espino Jr. and Vice Gov. Marlyn Primicias-Agabas established an annual commemoration to honor the war veterans. The resolution named January 9 as Pangasinan Veterans' Day. On the 63rd anniversary of the Lingayen Gulf landings, President Fidel Ramos (a West Point graduate) appealed to U.S. President George W. Bush on behalf of 24,000 surviving war veterans to pass two legislative bills pending since 1968 in the U.S. House of Representatives — the Filipino Veterans’ Equity Act of 2006 and the Filipino Veterans’ Equity of 2005 sponsored by former Senator Daniel Inouye.

== Economy ==
Fishing and salt-making are the primary industries on Lingayen Gulf. In fact, the name Pangasinan literally means "place where salt is made". Salt is collected from seawater through evaporation, leaving the crystalline salt behind.

Lingayen Gulf is also home to the 1200 megawatt Sual Power Station, the Philippines largest coal power plant.
