= Saint Peter the Martyr Parish Church (Sual) =

Roman Catholic church in Pangasinan, Philippines

Sual Church
- Saint Peter the Martyr Parish Church
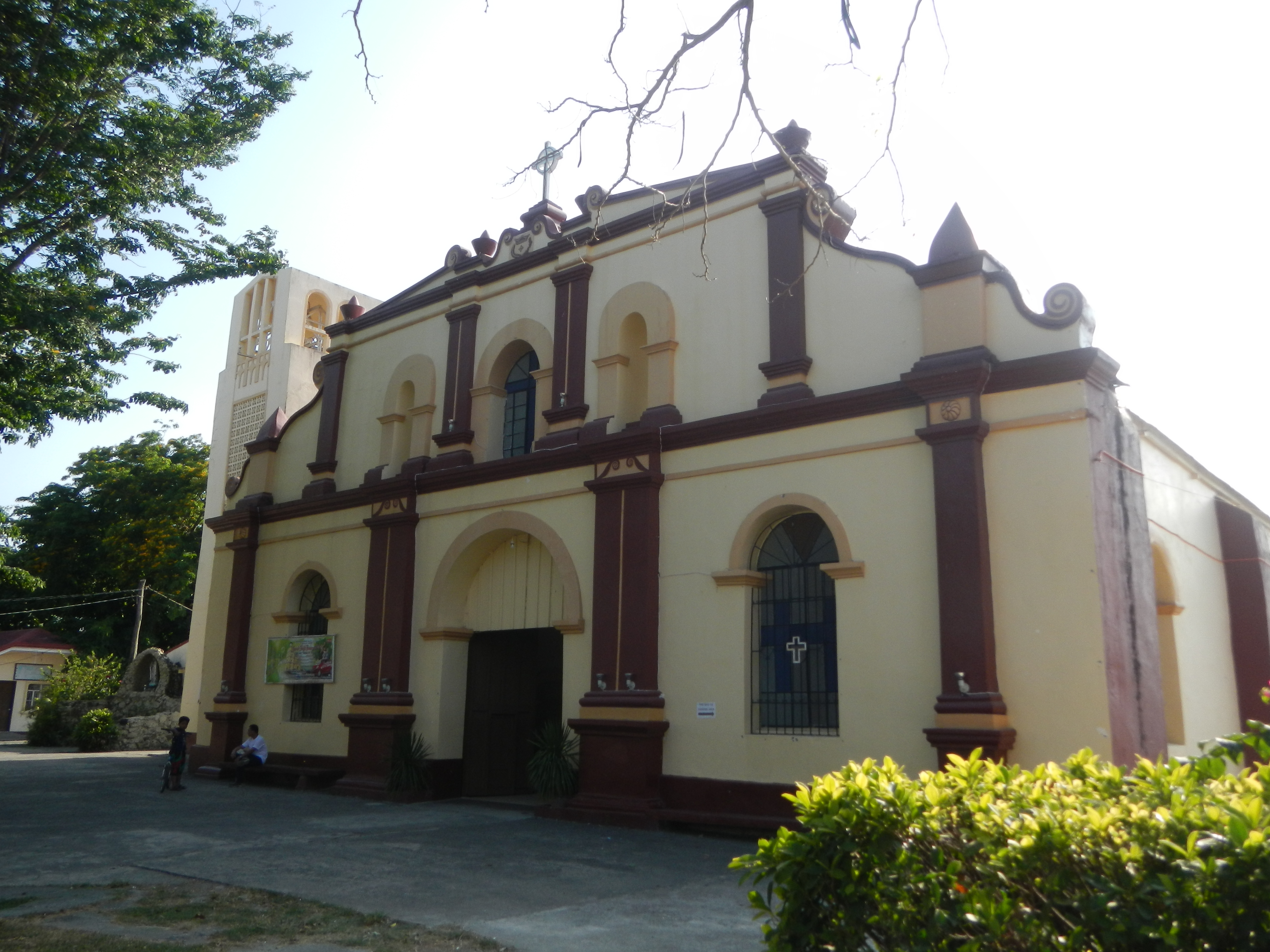
- Church façade in 2016

- Location in Luzon Location in the Philippines
- 16°04′01″N 120°05′44″E
- Location: Sual, Pangasinan
- Country: Philippines
- Denomination: Roman Catholic

History
- Status: Parish church
- Dedication: Saint Peter

Architecture
- Functional status: Active
- Architectural type: Church building
- Style: Spanish Colonial Revival architecture

Administration
- Archdiocese: Lingayen-Dagupan
- Diocese: Alaminos

Clergy
- Archbishop: Socrates B. Villegas
- Bishop: Sede vacante

Saint Peter the Martyr Parish Church, commonly known as Sual Church, is a Roman Catholic church located in Sual, Pangasinan, Philippines. It is under the jurisdiction of the Diocese of Alaminos. The church was reconstructed twice, during mid-1880s and 1891, in the Spanish Colonial Revival architectural style. For the third time, it was rebuilt again and was destroyed during the 1945 Liberation of Manila.

== History ==
Father Gabriel Perez began the construction of the first church and convent. The convent was later completed by Father Juan Gutierrez while the church by Father Pedro Villanova in 1870. A second church was constructed under the term of Father Felix Casas in 1883. The construction was suspended by the presiding bishop in 1891. The second church was completed by Father Eugenio Minguez in 1891 and was consecrated on June 8, 1893.

== Architectural features ==
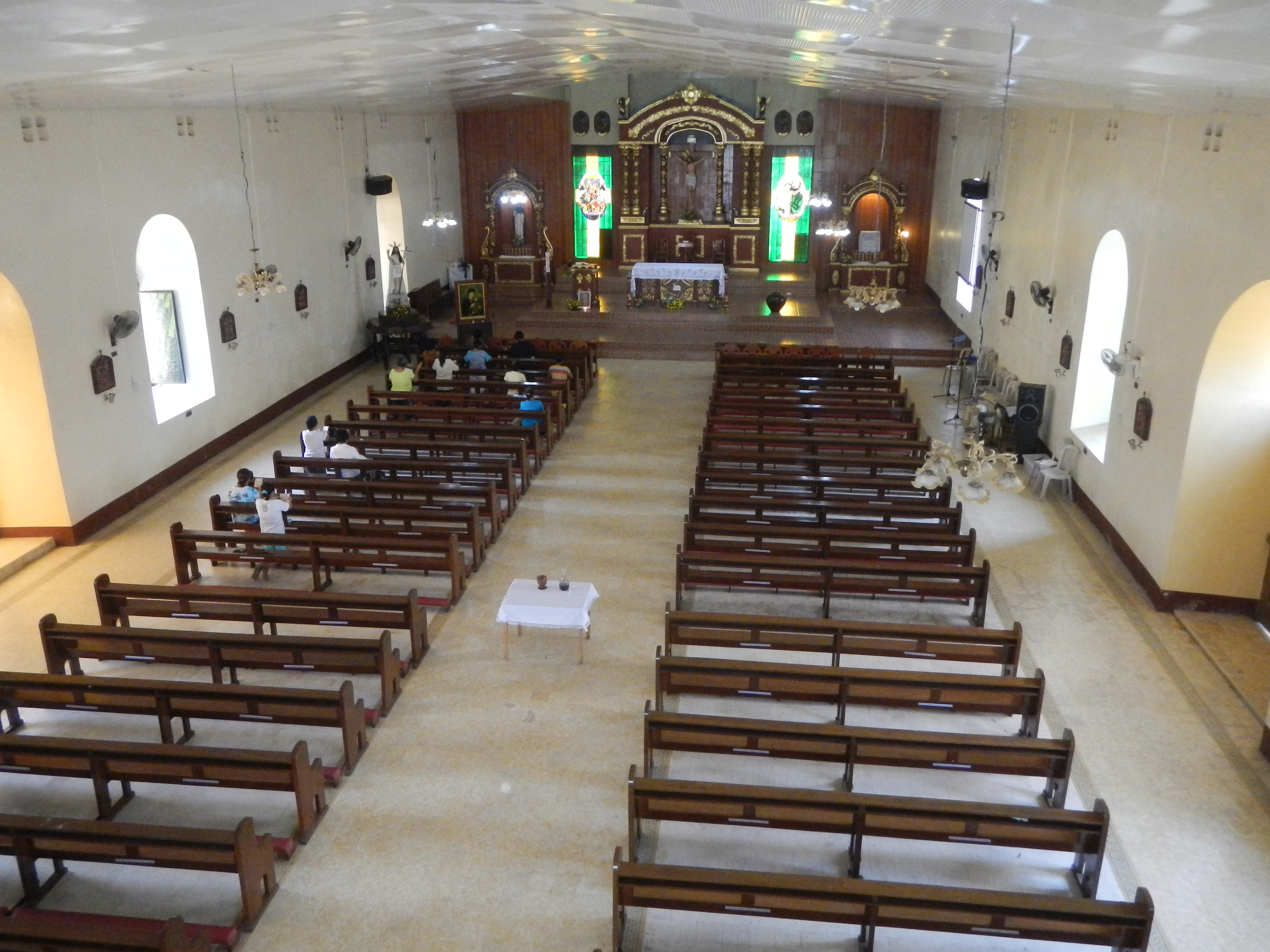
Church interior in 2016

The church resembles post-Baroque or the Spanish Colonial Revival architectural style apart from some of the components of the facade. The low entablature does not fit the classical proportions of the Renaissance style. The columns of the first and second levels provide an element of irregular rhythm, as well as the bell tower on the left side.
