= Sual Power Station =

Coal power plant of the Philippines

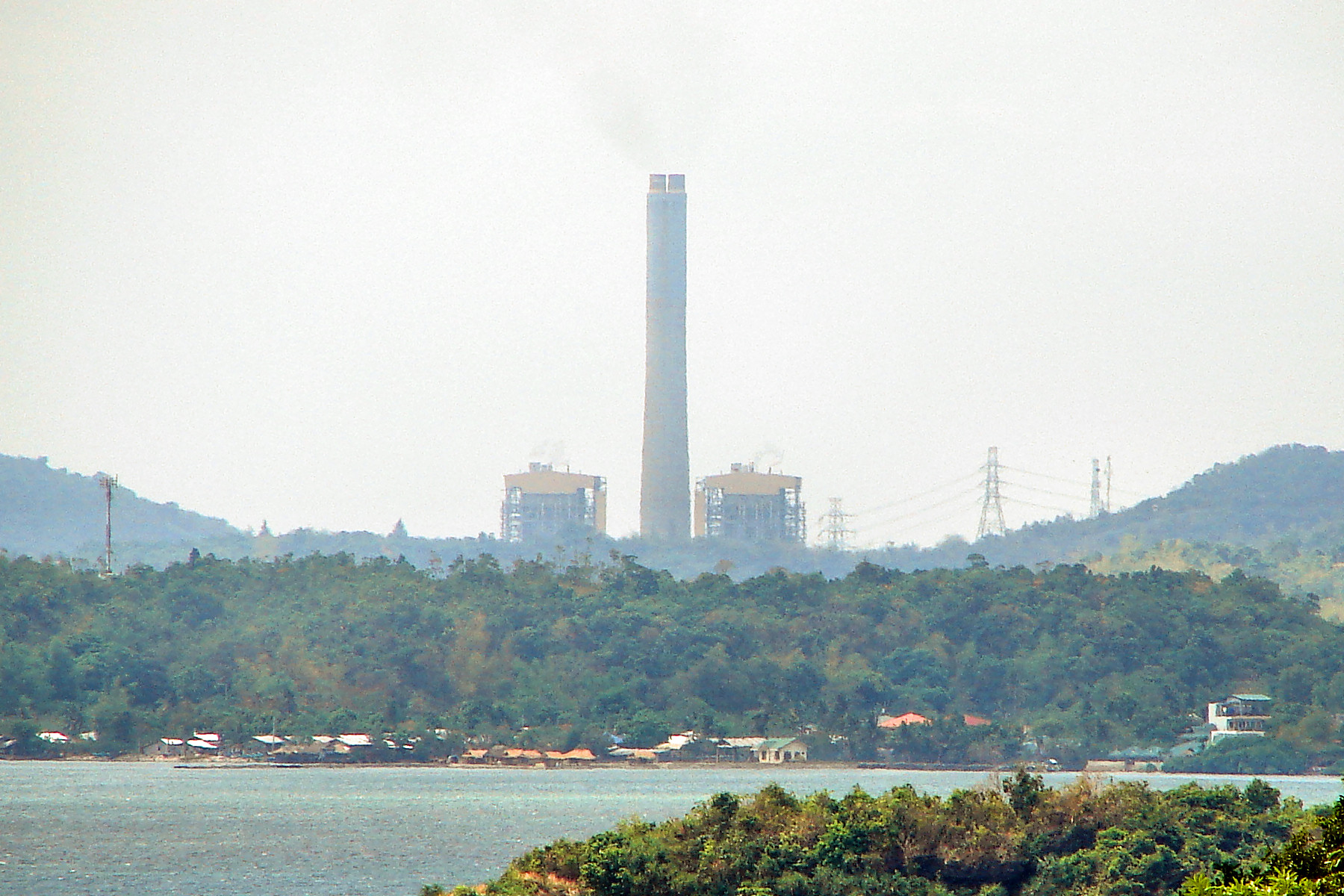
- Country: Philippines
- Location: Sual, Pangasinan
- Coordinates: 16°07′30″N 120°06′02″E
- Status: Operational
- Commission date: 1999
- Owner: TeaM Energy
- Operator: San Miguel Energy Corporation

Thermal power station
- Primary fuel: Coal

Power generation
- Nameplate capacity: 1,218 MW

External links
- Commons: Related media on Commons

Sual Power Station is a 1,200-MW coal-fired power station located near Lingayen Gulf in Sual, Pangasinan, Philippines.

== Ownership and administration ==
The coal-fired power station is owned by Team Energy, a company established as a joint venture between Marubeni Corporation and Tokyo Electric Power Corporation. San Miguel Energy Corporation is the independent power producer administrator (IPPA) of the facility since 2009.

== Background ==
Development started when Consolidated Electric Power Asia Ltd, a subsidiary of Hopewell Holdings, bid and won a $900mn BOOT tender for a 1,000-MW power station at Sual. Site preparation began in 1995 and construction started in February 1996. It was made operational in 1999 and full power generation was commenced in 2007.

Due to the presence of the coal power plant, Sual port was established close to the power plant in 2012. Sual Port a large port for the cargo of coal, and among the largest and most important coal discharge ports of The Philippines. It can accommodate ships with a maximum draft of 13.3 metres and a maximum LOA (Length overall) of 225 metres. Its Flue-gas stack has a height of 220 m (720 ft).

== See also ==
- List of power stations in the Philippines
- List of largest power stations in the world
