= Bonuan Gueset =

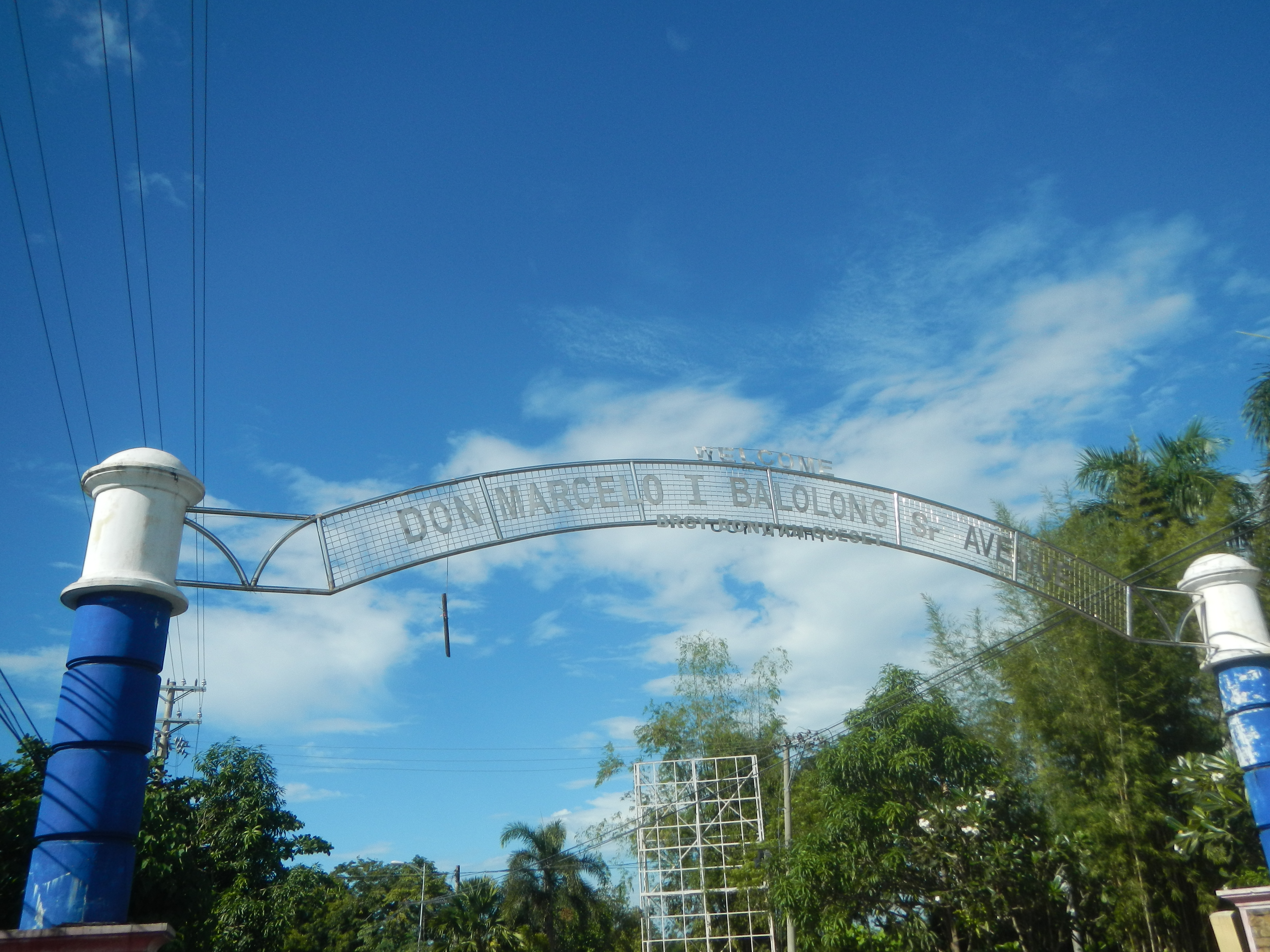
- Barangay Bonuan Gueset Welcome Arch

- Location within the Philippines
- Coordinates: 16.0754°N 120.3432°E
- Country: Philippines
- Region: Ilocos (Region I)
- Province: Pangasinan (geographically only)
- City: Dagupan
- District: 4th district of Pangasinan

Government
  - Chairman: Capt. Peter Joshua Natividad Dorado

Area
  - Total: 2.5 km^{2} (0.97 sq mi)
- Elevation: 0.30 m (1 ft)

Population (2020)
  - Total: 25,390
  - Density: 10,000/km^{2} (26,000/sq mi)
- Time zone: UTC+8 (PHT)
- ZIP code: 2400
- Dialing code: 075

Bonuan Gueset, an urban barangay in Dagupan, is the most populated out of the 3,267 barangays in Region I with 25,390 persons based on 2020 Philippine Census. Located in the northern coast of Dagupan, Philippines, it is accounted for about 13.6% of the city's population. It is also one of the "Bonuan" barangays of which the world famous Bonuan Bangus (Milkfish) is homed.

== History ==
Bonuan Gueset became a Barangay by a virtue Republic Act No. 170, authored by Speaker Eugenio Perez. It was signed into law on June 20, 1934.

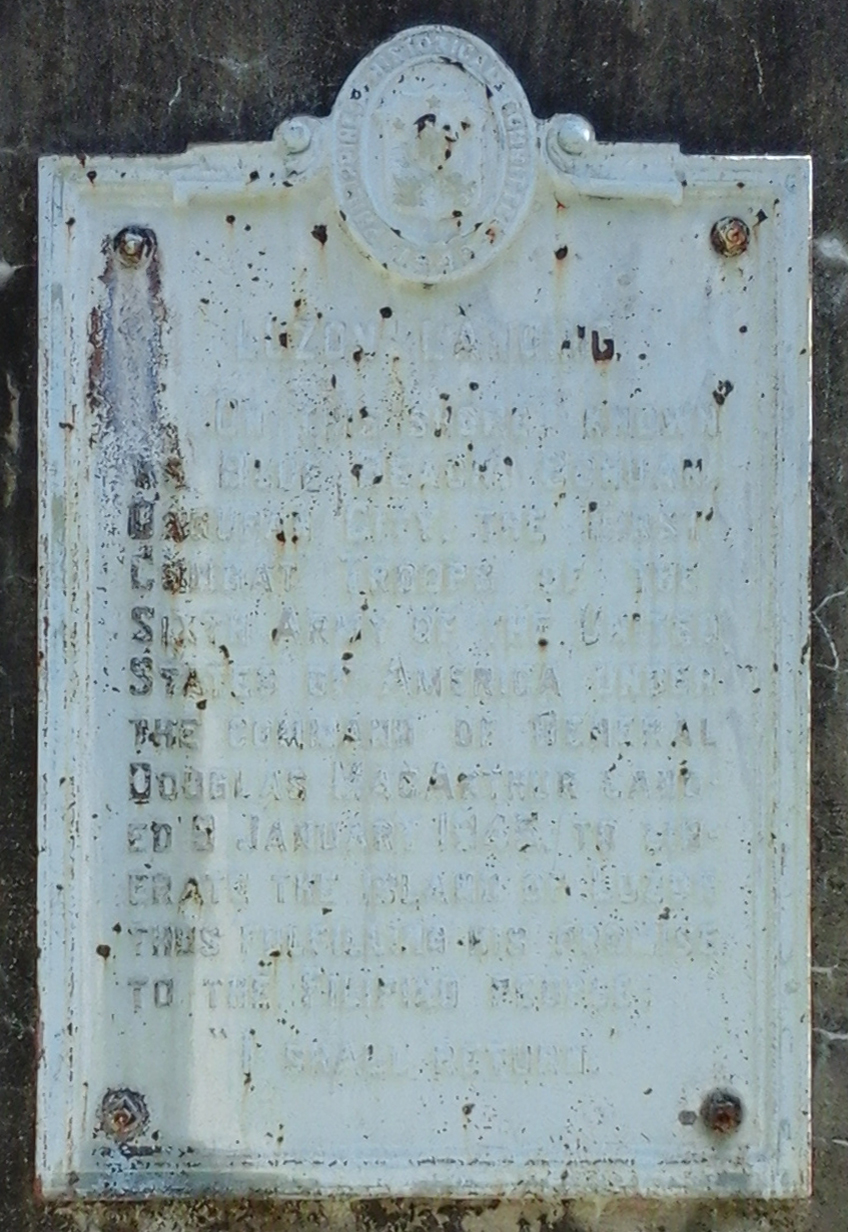
NHCP Historical marker

=== Gen. Douglas MacArthur Luzon Landing ===
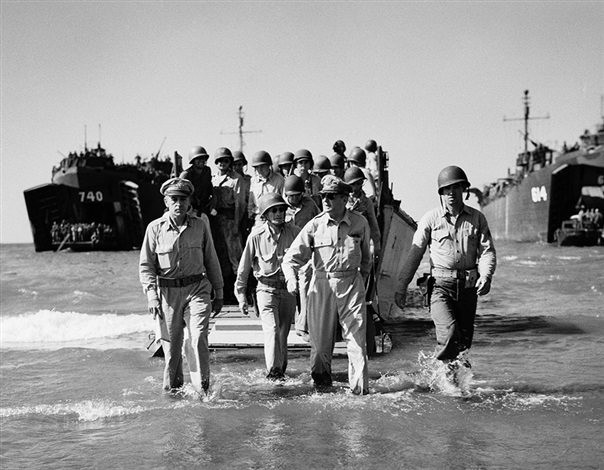
General Douglas MacArthur Landing at Luzon, Philippines, 1945. "Blue Beach", Dagupan, Lingayen Gulf

On this shore, known as Blue Beach in Bonuan Gueset, the first combat troops of the sixth army of the United States of America under the command of General Douglas MacArthur landed on 9 January 1945 to liberate the island of Luzon, thus fulfilling his famous promise to the Filipino people: 'I shall return'.

== Geography ==
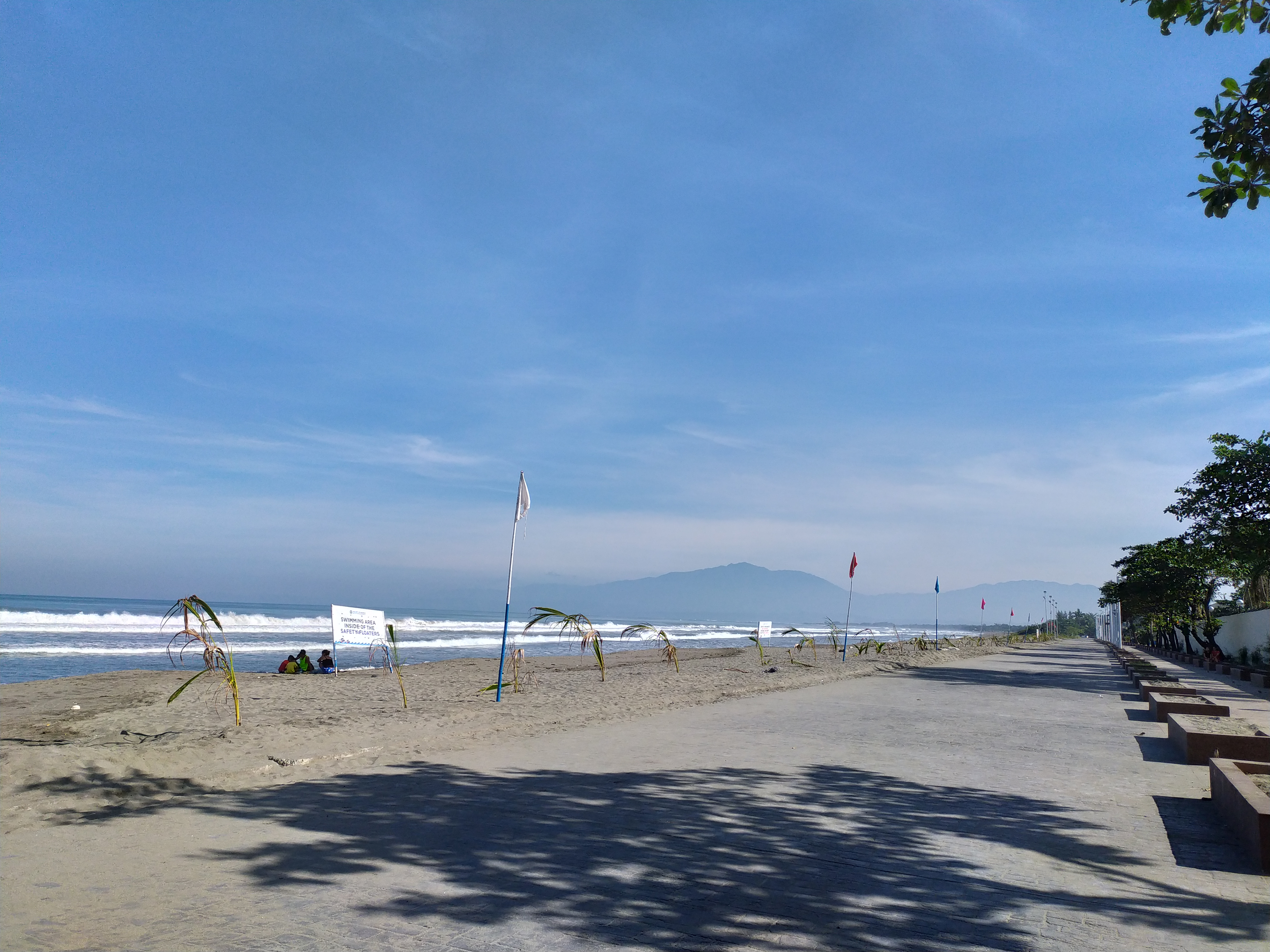
Tondaligan Blue Beach baywalk

Bonuan Gueset lies along the northern coastal borders of Dagupan. It is deadlocked by bodies of water with only the North Eastern margin as its inland flank. Dagupan's main river channel, Pantal River which passes by the Western margin of Bonuan, drains into Lingayen Gulf. Bonuan is connected to downtown Dagupan by Dawel Bridge which transects Dawel River, a tributary to Pantal River. Much of the fishpond nestled within Bonuan is located in Bonuan Gueset. It is bounded by Barangay Pantal in South and Barangay Bonuan Binloc in North East. It is also a passageway to come up in San Fabian, Pangasinan. Many travelers to North from Dagupan and nearby towns take a shortcut in Bonuan & Bonuan Gueset as its entrance.

== Landmarks & Tourist Attractions ==
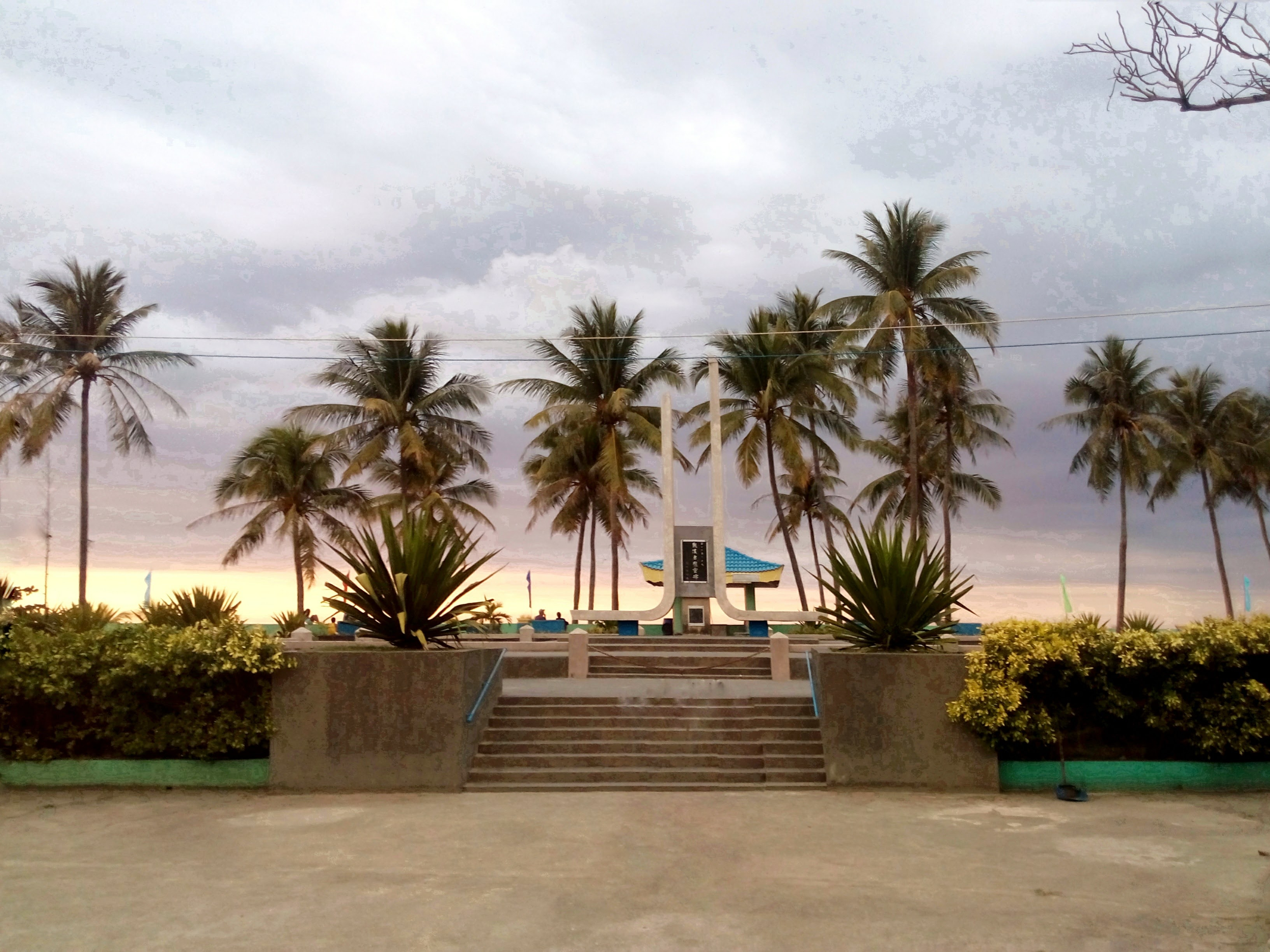
Filipino-Japanese Garden in Tondaligan Blue Beach

Aside from being notably the largest barangay in the region, it is also known for being the location of many prominent and historical parks and landmarks in Dagupan. The Parks include the Tondaligan People's Park, Japan-Philippine Friendship Garden, and Pangasinan Phil. Veteran's Park Gen. Mac Arthur Statue's site.

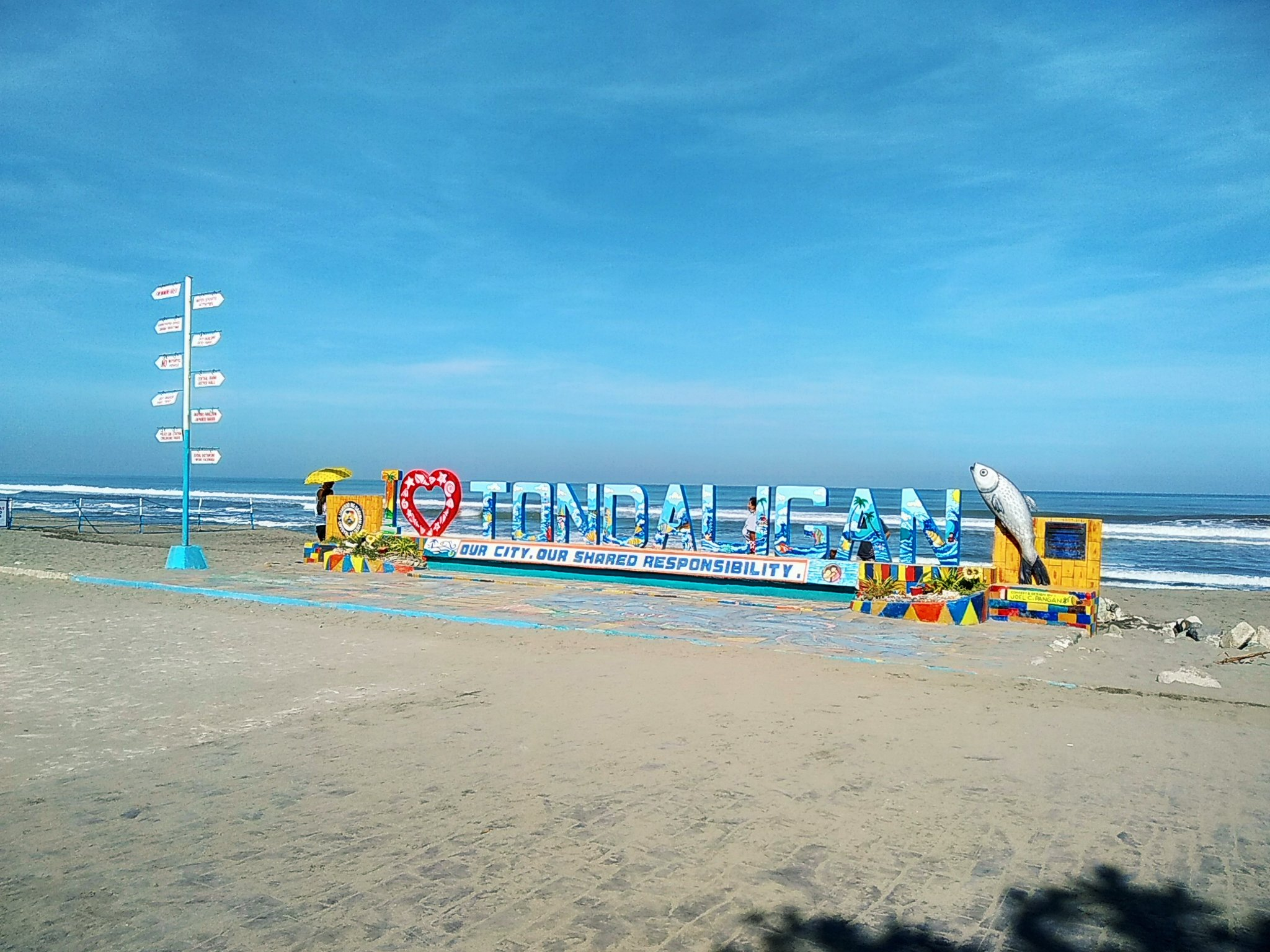
Tondaligan Beach Marker is located in Tondaligan Baywalk, Barangay Bonuan Gueset, Tondaligan Beach Park Complex in Dagupan

Facing Lingayen Gulf, Tondaligan Beach - an urban beach park complex flocked by tourists and patronized by locals - offers numerous amenities. The extensive Tondaligan baywalk, dubbed as the longest in the region, is a prominent feature along the Bonuan shore wherein cyclists can enjoy biking and savor Lingayen Gulf's picturesque view.

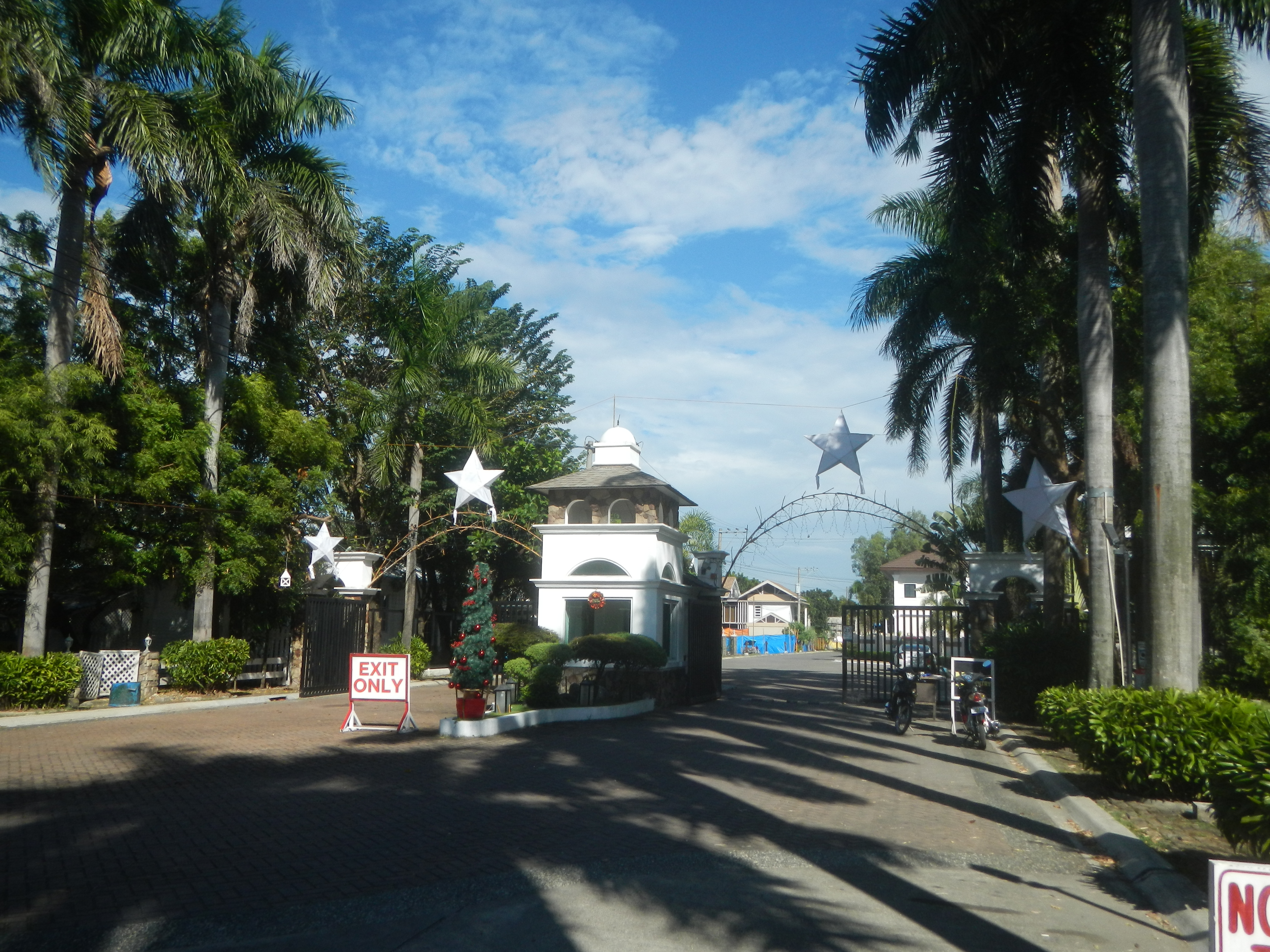

Numerous gated communities also dot the barangay to cater to the city's suburban housing needs. Premier class gated neighborhood such as San Marino Place is situated at the barangay's main entry point, with most of its land were reclaimed beside the Dawel river banks. The biggest gated community in the city - Tondaligan Blue Beach Subdivision - is situated near the historic coast of Bonuan Blue Beach. Smaller but decent communities are also present such as Maramba Bankers Village and White Plains Subdivision, among others.

== Government Center ==
There are also several Government establishments located in Bonuan Gueset, namely: The Central Bank of the Philippines, PAGASA, Justice Hall, Dagupan City Jail, and the Delta Camp of the Philippine Navy.

== See also ==
- Dagupan
- Pangasinan
