= Labrador, Pangasinan =

Municipality in Pangasinan, Philippines

Labrador
- Municipality
- Municipality of Labrador
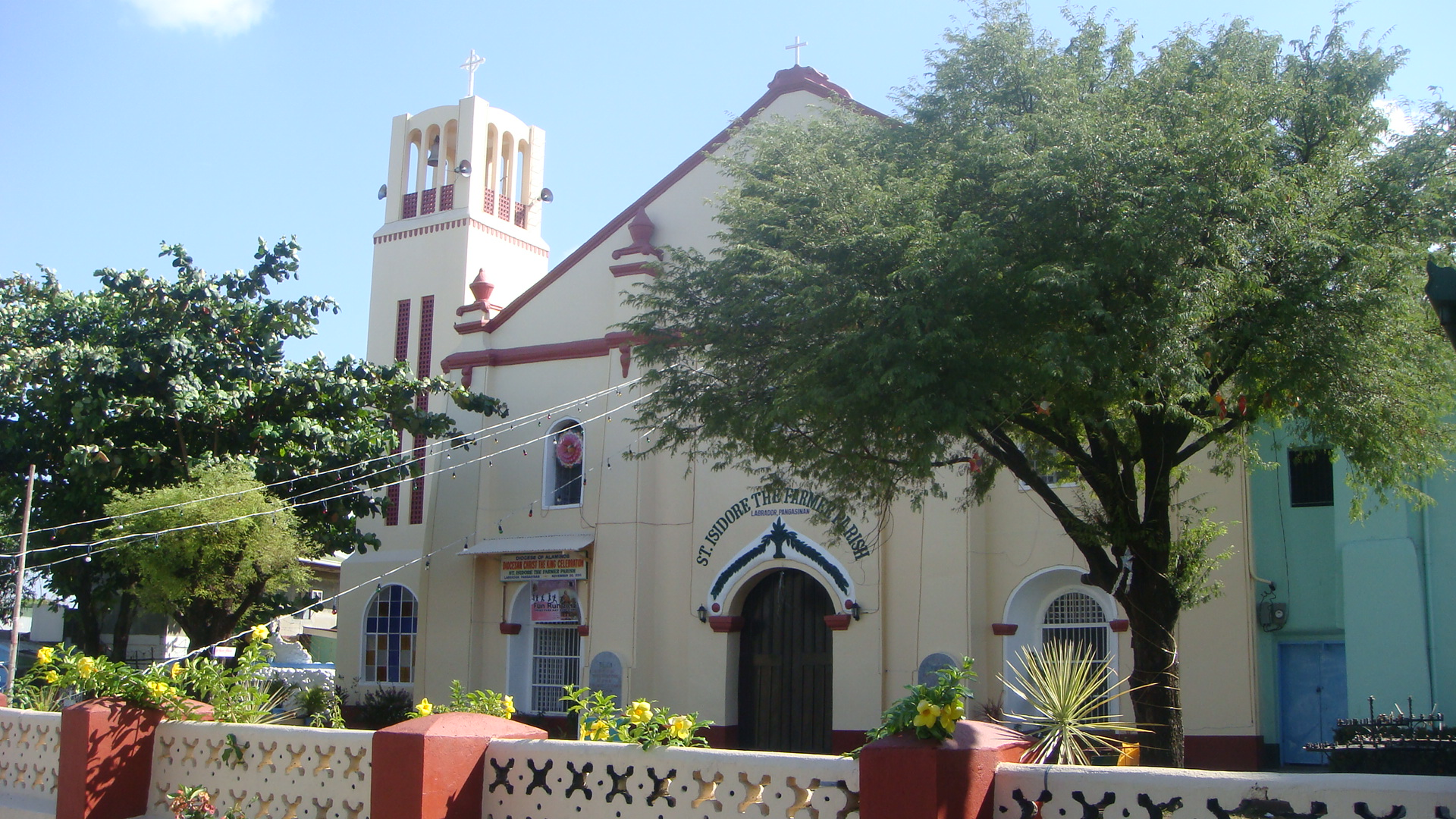
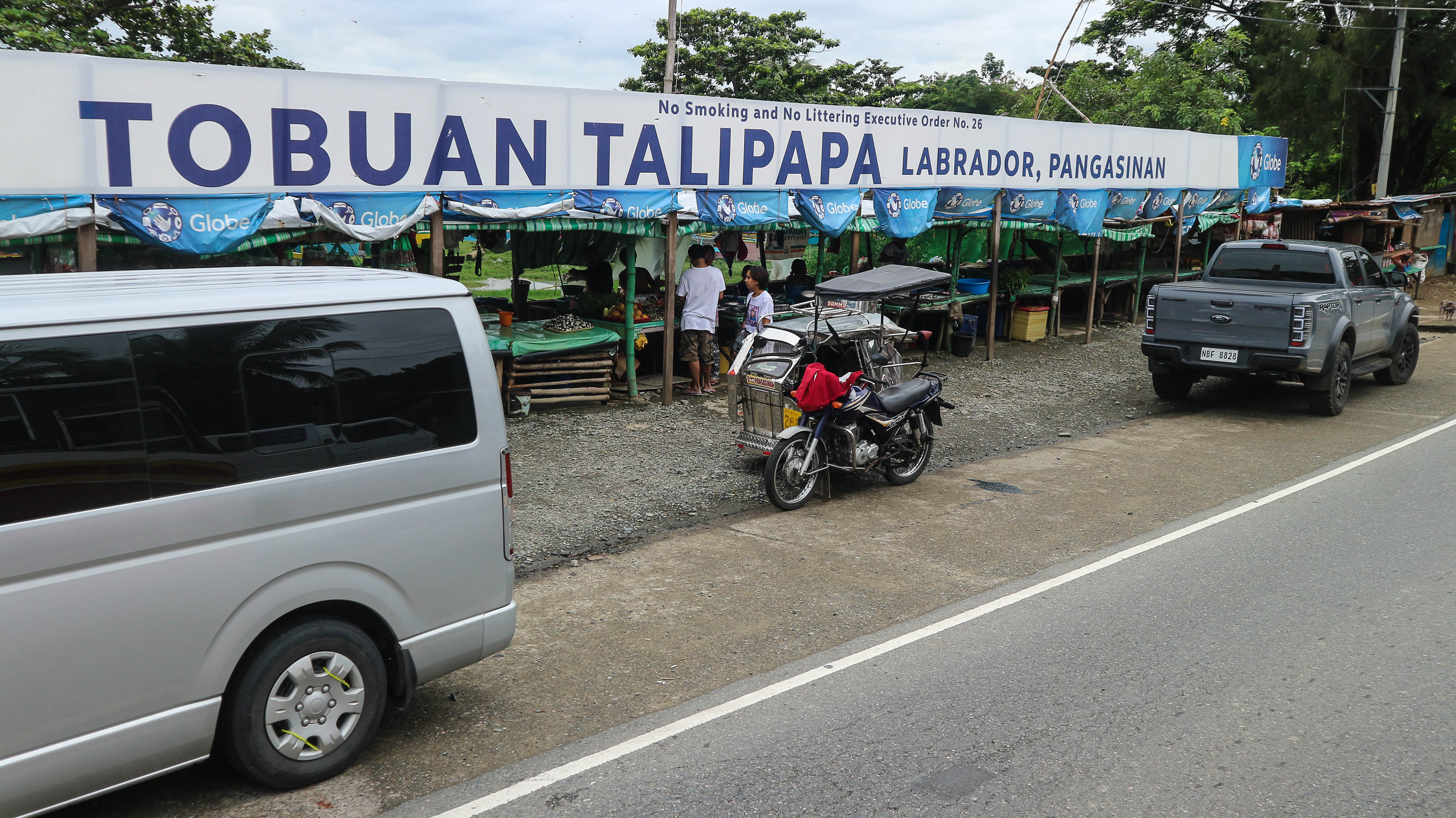
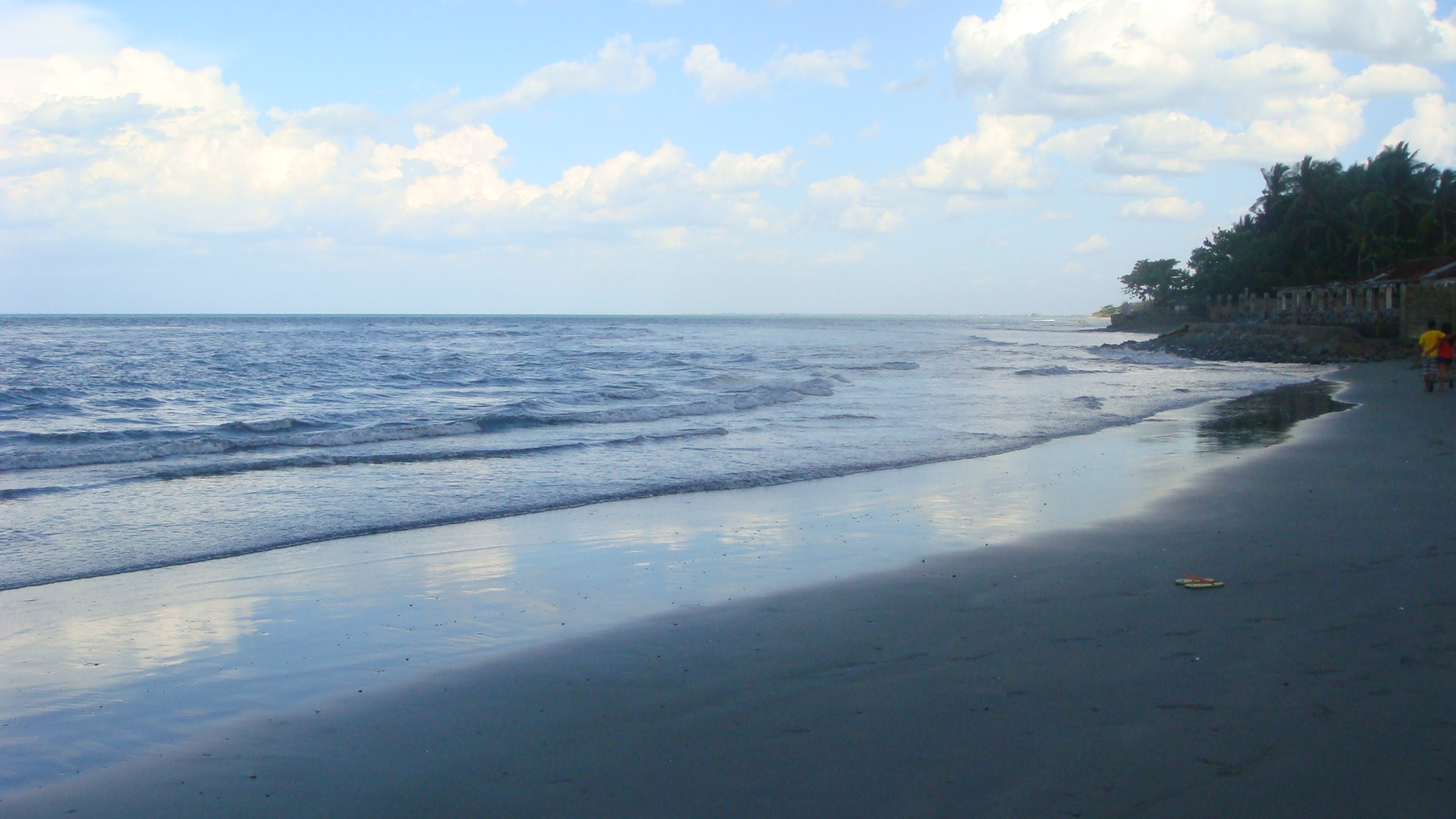
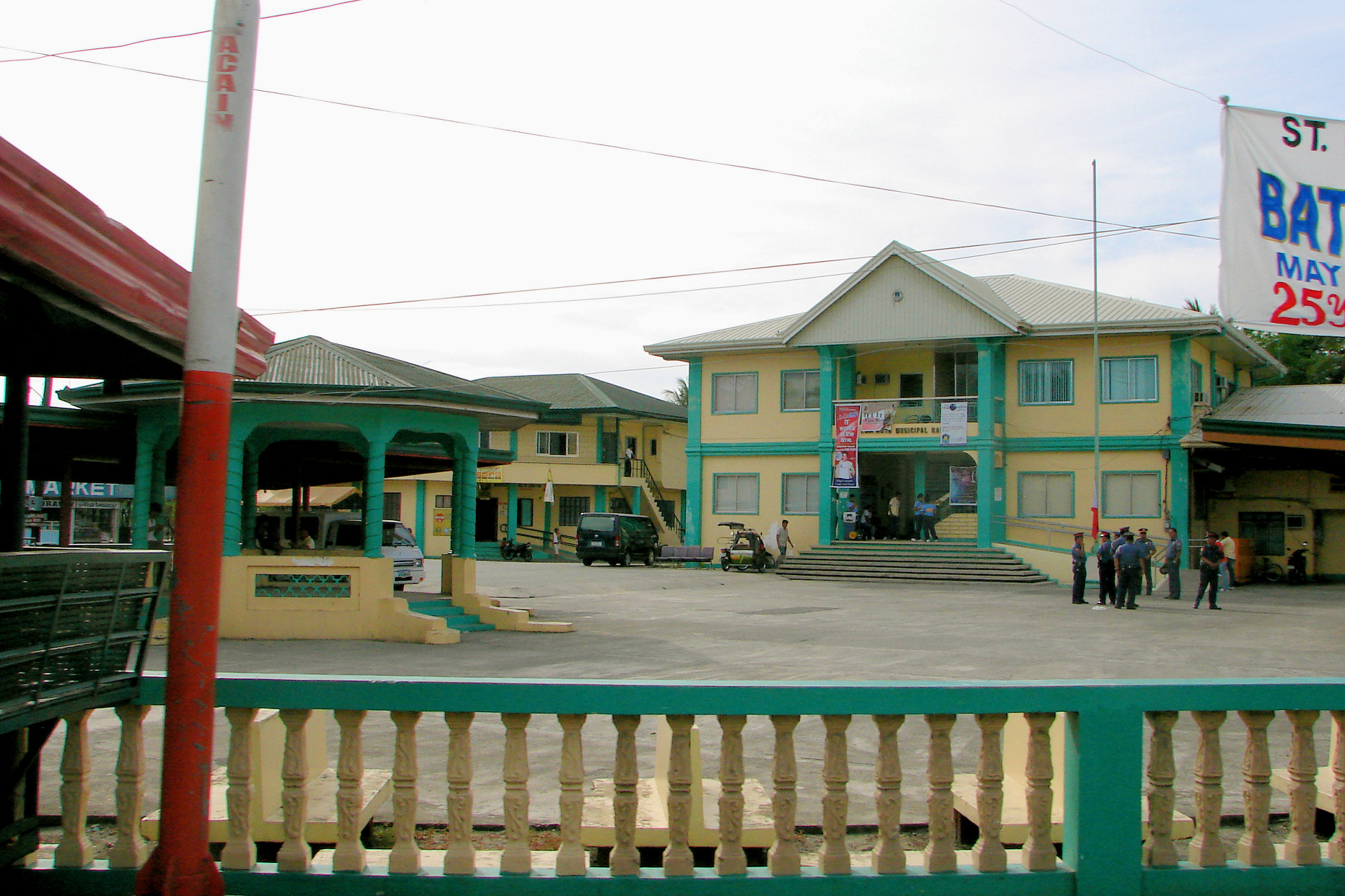
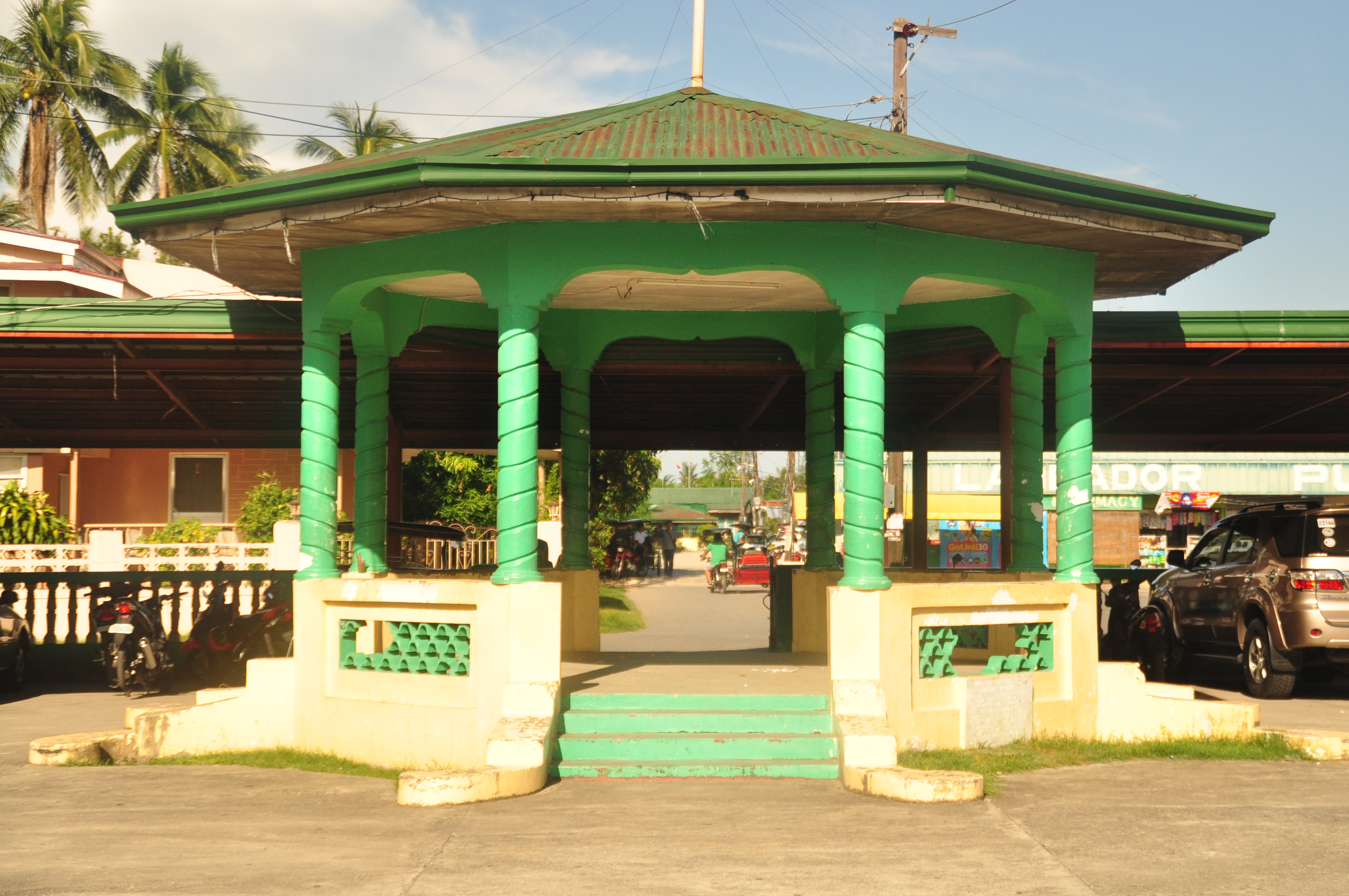
- Clockwise from top: Saint Isidore the Farmer Parish Church; Uyong Beach; Glorietta of Labrador; Town Hall; and Tobuan Talipapa.

- Seal

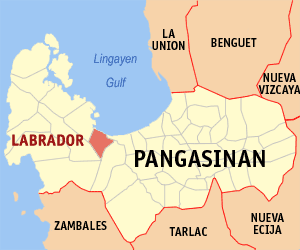
- Map of Pangasinan with Labrador highlighted
- Interactive map of Labrador
- Location within the Philippines
- Coordinates: 16°01′30″N 120°08′46″E
- Country: Philippines
- Region: Ilocos Region
- Province: Pangasinan
- District: 2nd district
- Founded: May 15, 1857
- Annexation to Sual: October 8, 1903
- Chartered: January 27, 1908
- Named after: San Isidro de Labrador
- Barangays: 10 (see Barangays)

Government
  - Type: Sangguniang Bayan
  - Mayor: Noel N. Uson
  - Vice Mayor: Melchora A. Yaneza
  - Representative: Marcos Juan Bruno O. Cojuangco
  - Municipal Council: Members: George P. Vinoya; Joseph E. Manaois; Jojit Benigno S. Aquino; Alexander E. Estrada--; Jorge F. Jallorina; Aireen O. Bobis; Juan J. Pansoy Jr.; Daisy M. Arenas-Nabua
  - Electorate: 19,925 voters (2025)

Area
  - Total: 90.99 km^{2} (35.13 sq mi)
- Elevation: 81 m (266 ft)
- Highest elevation: 776 m (2,546 ft)
- Lowest elevation: 0 m (0 ft)

Population (2024 census)
  - Total: 26,995
  - Density: 296.7/km^{2} (768.4/sq mi)
  - Households: 6,484

Economy
  - Income class: 3rd municipal income class
  - Poverty incidence: 12.99% (2023)
  - Revenue: ₱ 150.9 million (2024)
  - Assets: ₱ 411.2 million (2024)
  - Expenditure: ₱ 133.2 million (2024)
  - Liabilities: ₱ 36.03 million (2024)

Service provider
  - Electricity: Central Pangasinan Electric Cooperative (CENPELCO)
- Time zone: UTC+8 (PST)
- ZIP code: 2402
- PSGC: 0105521000
- IDD : area code: +63 (0)75
- Native languages: Pangasinan; Ilocano; Tagalog

Labrador, officially the Municipality of Labrador (Pangasinan: Baley na Labrador; Ilocano: Ili ti Labrador; Tagalog: Bayan ng Labrador), is a municipality in the province of Pangasinan, Philippines. According to the 2024 census, it has a population of 26,995 people.

== History ==
On October 8, 1903, by virtue of Act No. 931, the municipality of San Isidro Labrador was merged with the municipality of Sual, with the seat of the municipal government at Sual.

On January 27, 1908, by virtue of Executive Order No. 6, issued by Governor-General James F. Smith, San Isidro Labrador was separated from Sual and reestablished as a municipality, effective January 1, 1909.

On February 28, 1914, by virtue of Act No. 2390, the names of the two municipalities of Pangasinan, San Isidro Labrador and San Isidro de Potot, were changed to Labrador and Burgos, respectively.

== Geography ==
Labrador is situated 12.69 kilometres (7.89 mi) from the provincial capital, Lingayen, and 221.62 kilometres (137.71 mi) from the country's capital city of Manila. It is between Sual and Bugallon on the Olongapo–Bugallon Road.

=== Barangays ===
Labrador is politically subdivided into 10 barangays. Each barangay consists of puroks and some have sitios.

- Bolo (*Kadampat, *Quiray)
- Bongalon
- Dulig
- Laois
- Magsaysay
- Poblacion
- San Gonzalo
- San Jose
- Tobuan
- Uyong

=== Climate ===
Climate data for Labrador, Pangasinan
Month	Jan	Feb	Mar	Apr	May	Jun	Jul	Aug	Sep	Oct	Nov	Dec	Year
Mean daily maximum °C (°F)	31 (88)	31 (88)	31 (88)	33 (91)	32 (90)	32 (90)	30 (86)	30 (86)	30 (86)	31 (88)	31 (88)	31 (88)	31 (88)
Mean daily minimum °C (°F)	21 (70)	21 (70)	22 (72)	24 (75)	24 (75)	24 (75)	23 (73)	23 (73)	23 (73)	23 (73)	23 (73)	22 (72)	23 (73)
Average precipitation mm (inches)	5.1 (0.20)	11.6 (0.46)	21.1 (0.83)	27.7 (1.09)	232.9 (9.17)	350.8 (13.81)	679.8 (26.76)	733.1 (28.86)	505 (19.9)	176.6 (6.95)	67.2 (2.65)	17.7 (0.70)	2,828.6 (111.38)
Average rainy days	3	3	3	4	14	18	23	25	22	15	8	4	142
Source: World Weather Online

== Demographics ==
Population census of Labrador
Year	Pop.	±% p.a.
1903	3,092	—
1918	3,920	+1.59%
1939	5,446	+1.58%
1948	6,967	+2.77%
1960	8,455	+1.63%
1970	10,835	+2.51%
1975	11,745	+1.63%
1980	12,120	+0.63%
1990	15,229	+2.31%
1995	16,706	+1.75%
2000	19,264	+3.10%
2007	20,508	+0.87%
2010	21,149	+1.13%
2015	23,201	+1.78%
2020	26,811	+3.09%
2024	26,995	+0.16%
Source: Philippine Statistics Authority

== Economy ==
Poverty incidence of Labrador

Source: Philippine Statistics Authority

== Government ==
=== Local government ===
Labrador is part of the second congressional district of the province of Pangasinan. It is governed by a mayor, designated as its local chief executive, and by a municipal council as its legislative body in accordance with the Local Government Code. The mayor, vice mayor, and the councilors are elected directly by the people through an election which is being held every three years.

=== Elected official ===
Members of the Municipal Council (2025-2028)
Position	Name
Congressman	Marcos Juan Bruno O. Congjuanco
Mayor	Noel N. Uson
Vice-Mayor	Melchora A. Yaneza
Councilors	George P. Vinoya
Councilors	Joseph E. Manaois
Councilors	Jojit Benigno S. Aquino
Councilors	Alexander E. Estrada
Councilors	Jorge F. Jallorina
Councilors	Aireen O. Bobis
Councilors	Juan J.Pansoy Jr.
Councilors	Daisy M. Arenas-Nabua

== Education ==
The Labrador Schools District Office governs all educational institutions within the municipality. It oversees the management and operations of all private and public elementary and high schools.

=== Primary and elementary schools ===
- Bolo Elementary School
- Bongalon Elementary School
- Dulig Elementary School
- Ramon Magsaysay Integrated School
- Kadampat Elementary School
- Labrador Central School
- Laois Elementary School
- St. Columban's School
- Tobuan Elementary School
- Uyong Elementary School

=== Secondary schools ===
- Labrador National High School
- Ramon Magsaysay Integrated School
- St. Columban's School

== Gallery ==
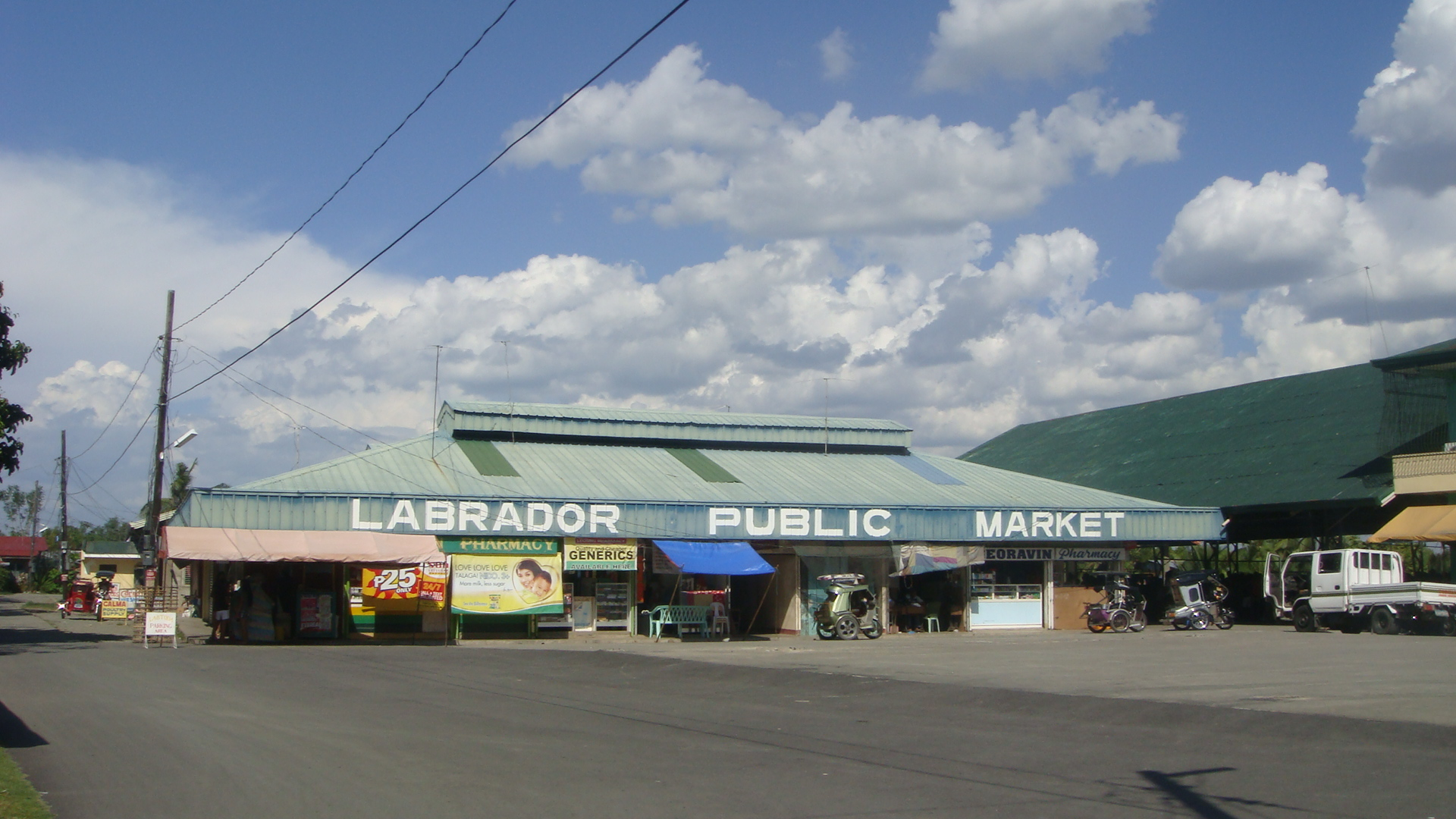
Public Market

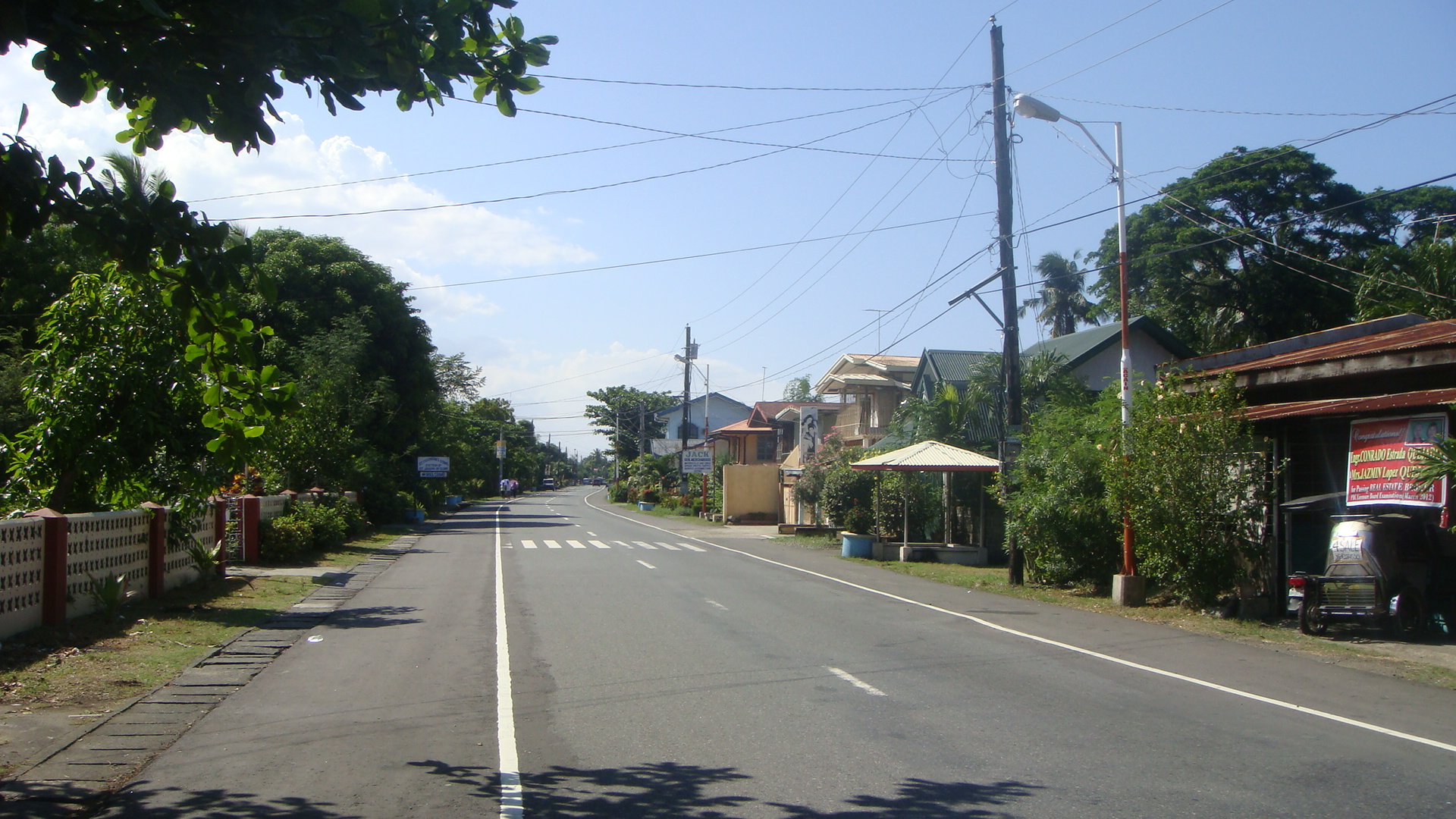
Highway and downtown

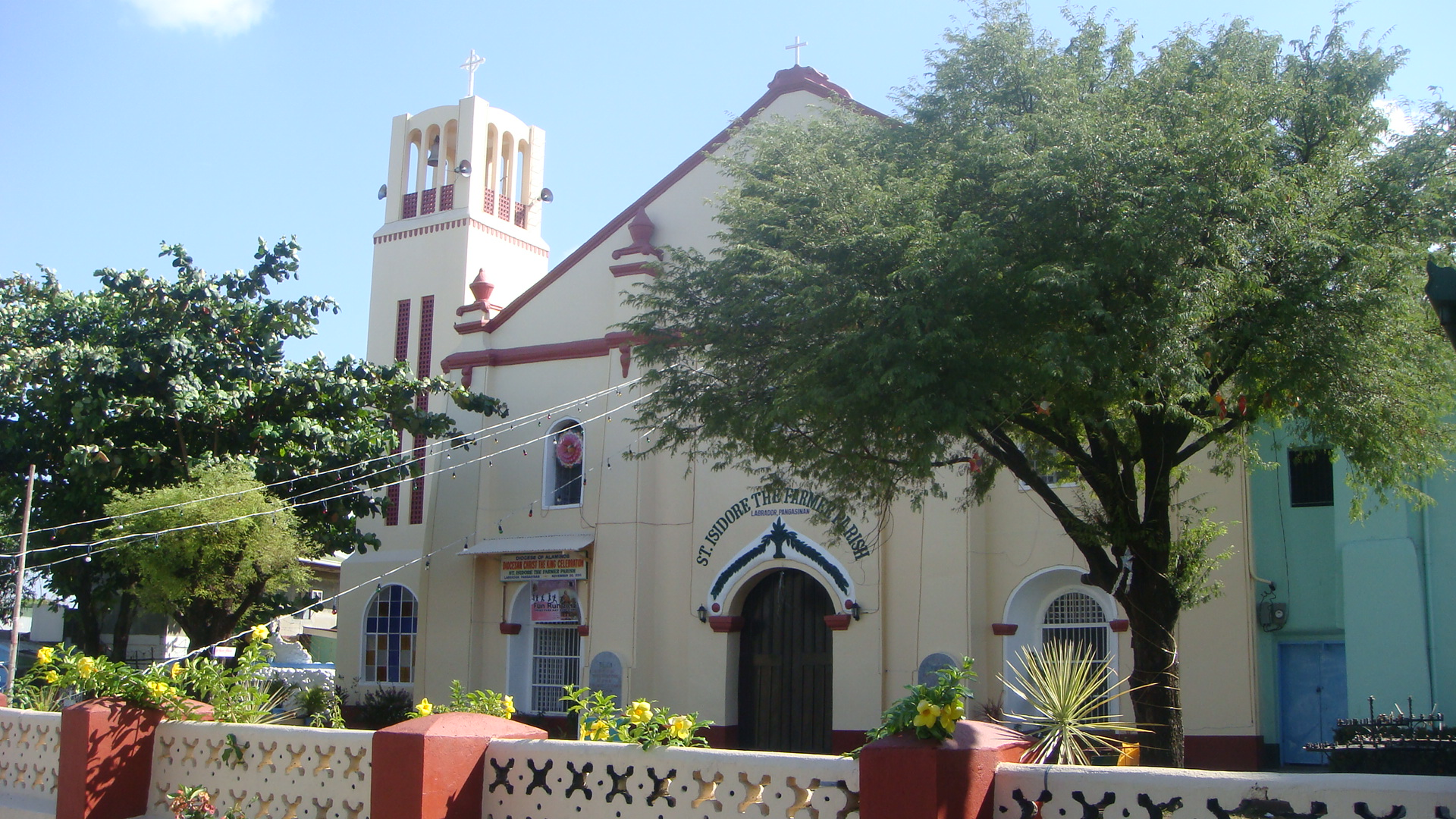
St. Isidore the Farmer Parish Church (Poblacion)

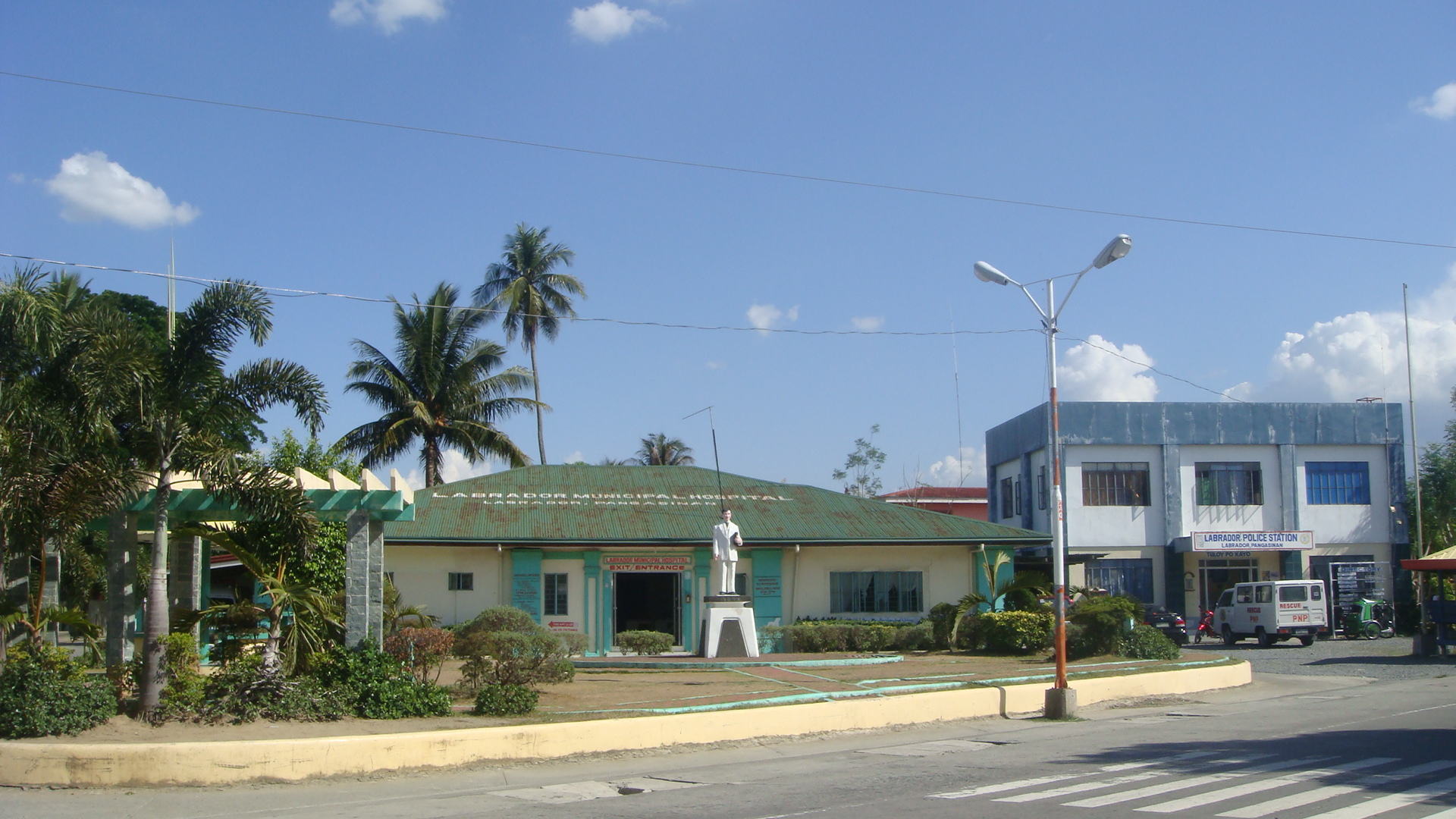
Police Station & Municipal Hospital (Poblacion)

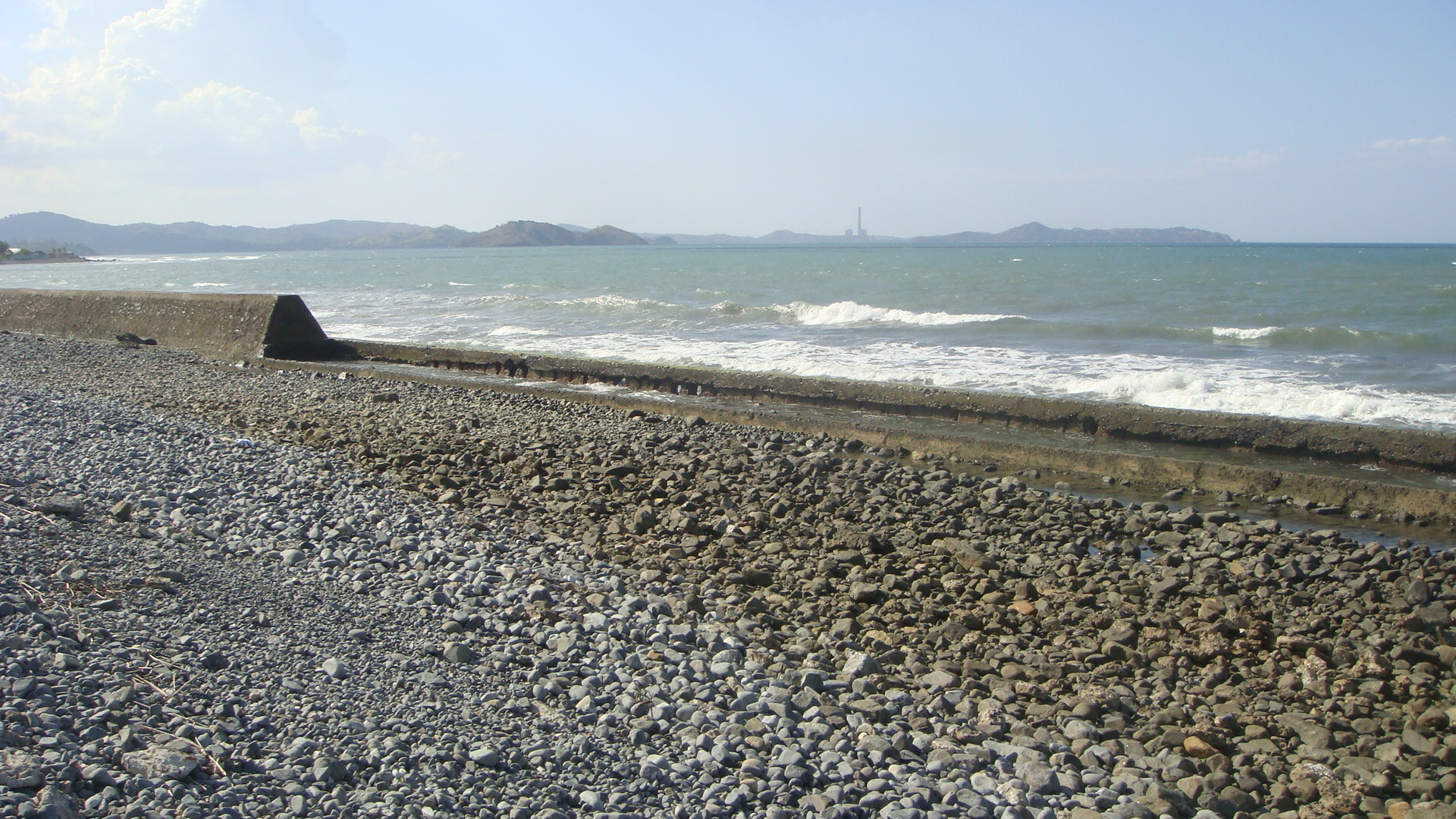
Laois beaches along coastal shores of Lingayen Gulf

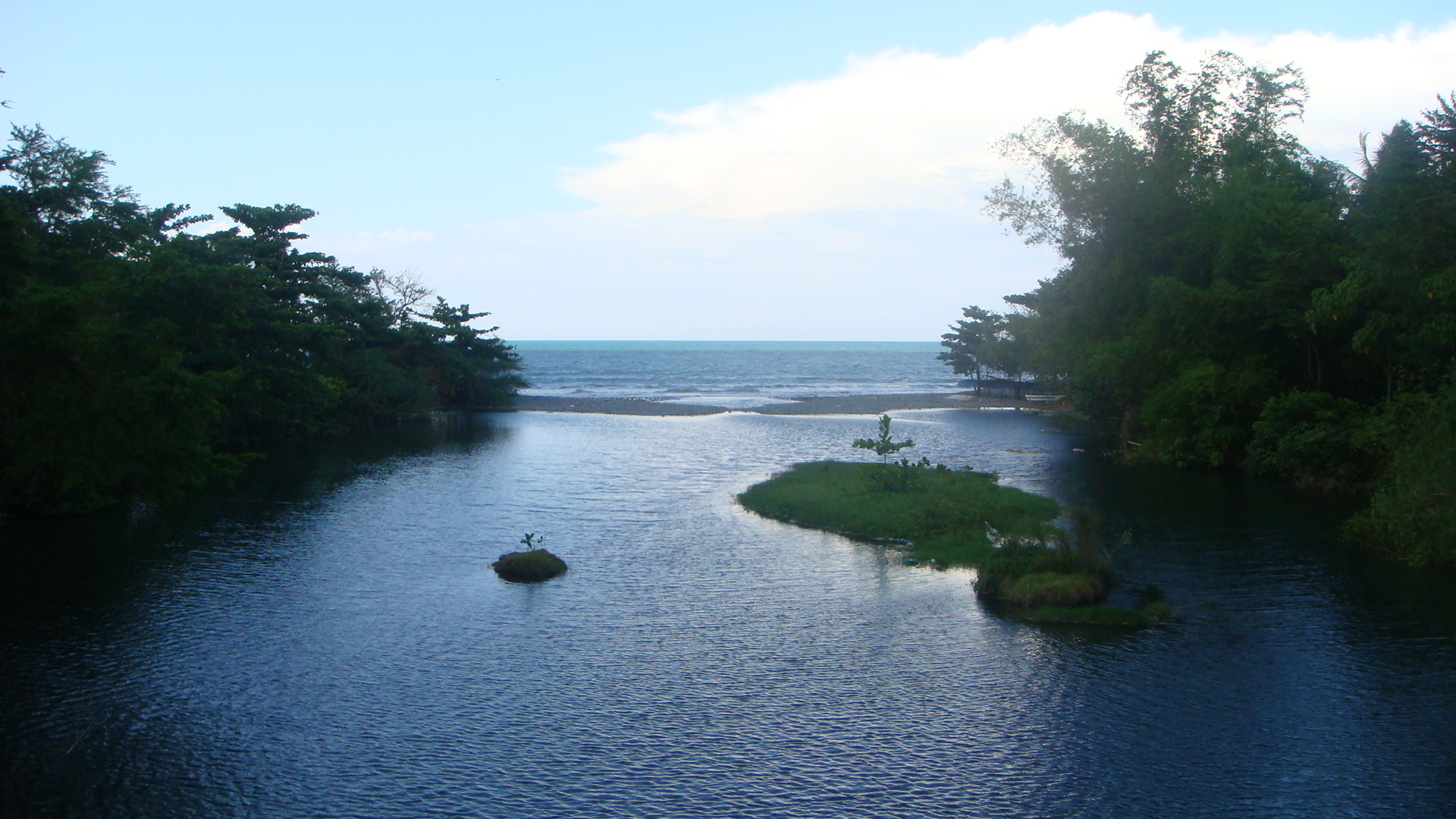
Uyong river, beaches and shores
