= Sual =

Municipality in Pangasinan, Philippines

- Municipality
- Municipality of Sual
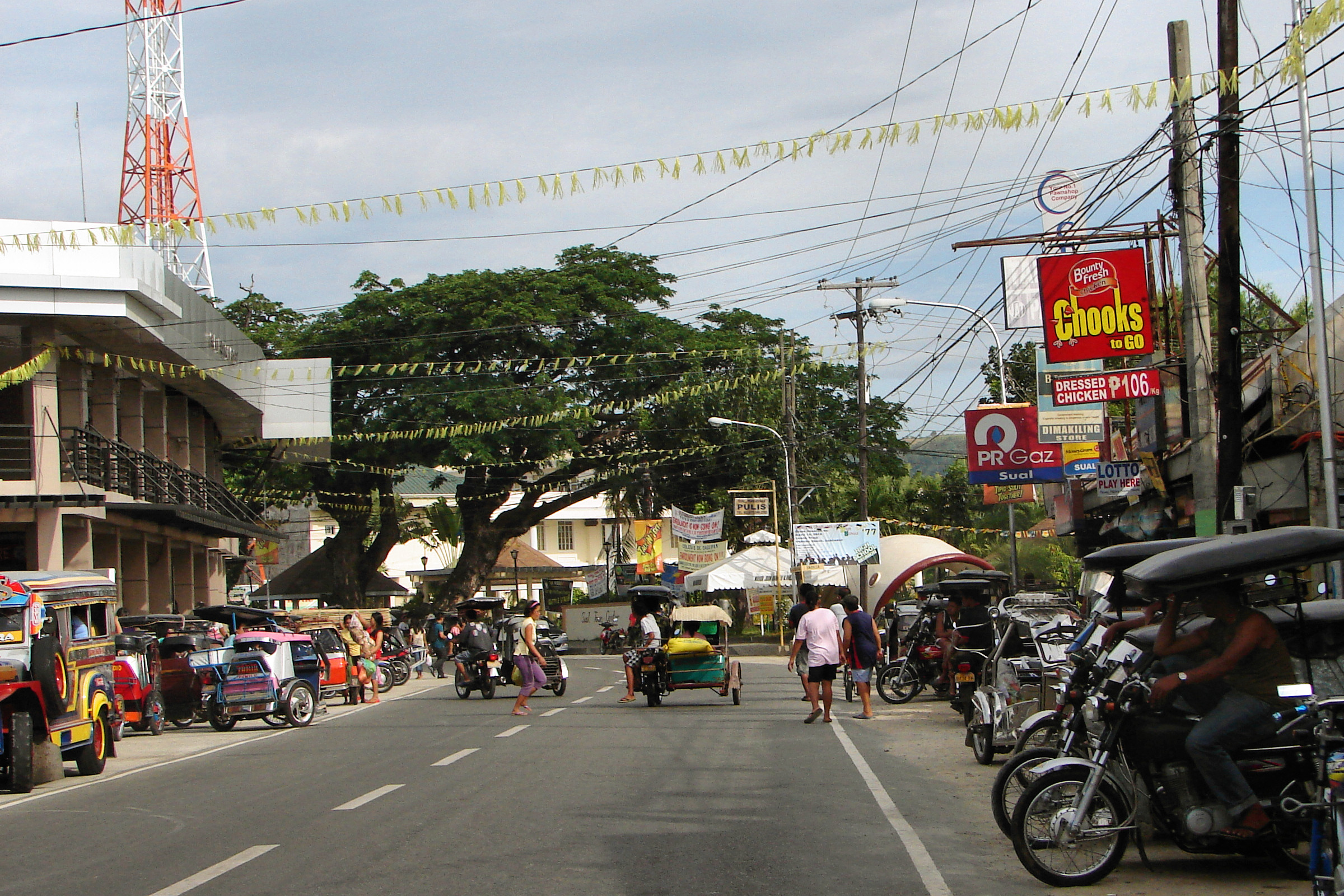
- Street in Sual

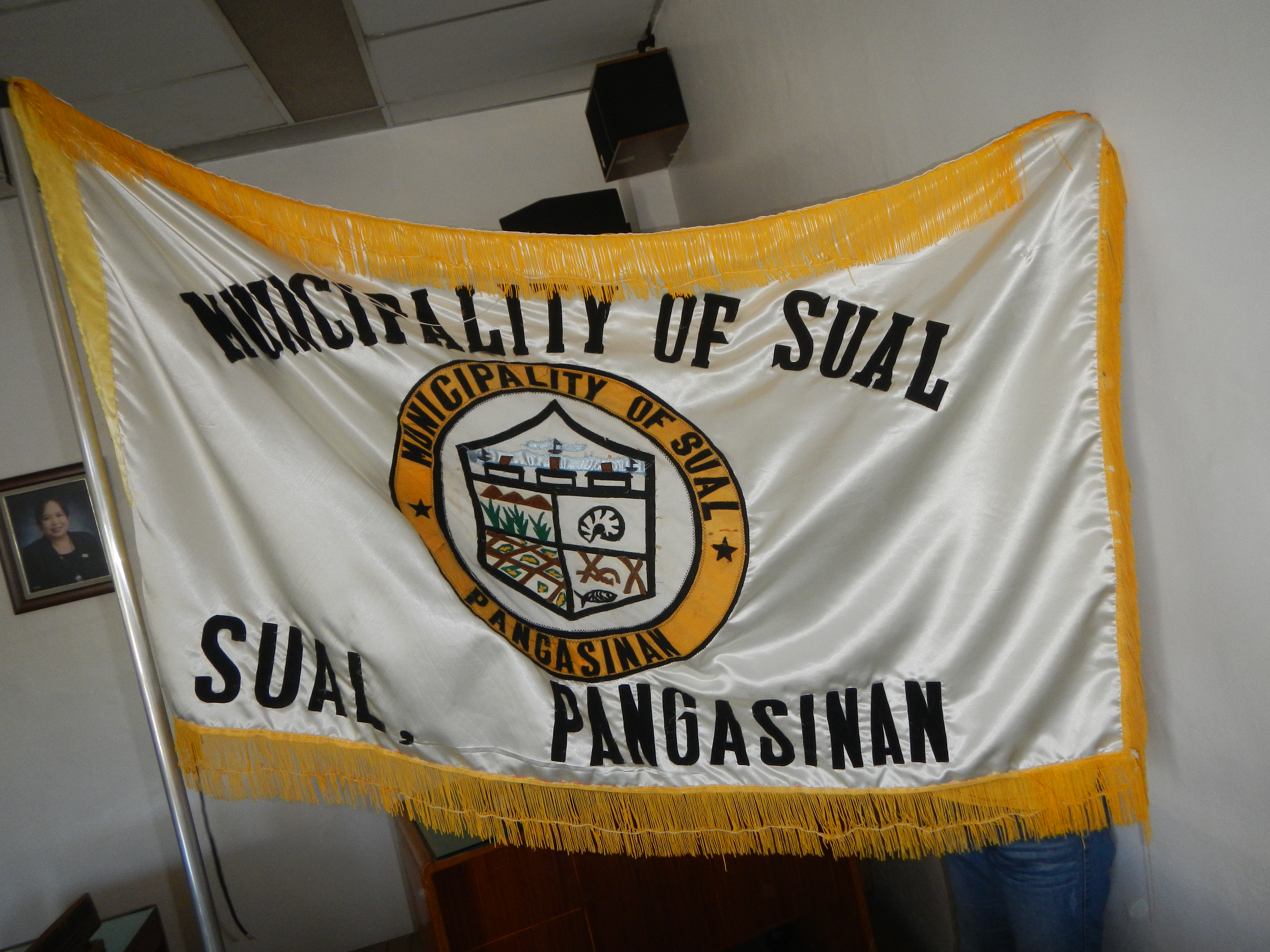
- Flag Seal

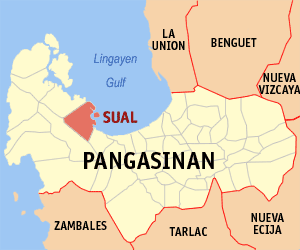
- Map of Pangasinan with Sual highlighted
- Interactive map of Sual
- Location within the Philippines
- Coordinates: 16°03′54″N 120°05′46″E
- Country: Philippines
- Region: Ilocos Region
- Province: Pangasinan
- District: 1st district
- Founded: May 20, 1805
- Barangays: 19 (see Barangays)

Government
  - Type: Sangguniang Bayan
  - Mayor: Liseldo D. Calugay (API)
  - Vice Mayor: Maximo D. Millan (API)
  - Representative: Arthur F. Celeste (NP)
  - Municipal Council: Members: Mherlie I. Osana (API); Dioneil G. Caburao (NPC); Gregorio G. Garcia Jr. (API); Nelson U. Fontanilla (API); Melody R. Beltran (NPC); Alexander D. Rigonan Jr. (API); Samson Paulo Brudo (API); Kenberly O. Edrosolan (API)
  - Electorate: 34,338 voters (2025)

Area
  - Total: 130.16 km^{2} (50.26 sq mi)
- Elevation: 77 m (253 ft)
- Highest elevation: 387 m (1,270 ft)
- Lowest elevation: 0 m (0 ft)

Population (2024 census)
  - Total: 38,625
  - Density: 296.75/km^{2} (768.58/sq mi)
  - Households: 10,084

Economy
  - Income class: 1st municipal income class
  - Poverty incidence: 14.29% (2023)
  - Revenue: ₱ 578.7 million (2024)
  - Assets: ₱ 3,080 million (2024)
  - Expenditure: ₱ 530.8 million (2024)
  - Liabilities: ₱ 1,286 million (2024)

Service provider
  - Electricity: Central Pangasinan Electric Cooperative (CENPELCO)
- Time zone: UTC+8 (PST)
- ZIP code: 2403
- PSGC: 0105542000
- IDD : area code: +63 (0)75
- Native languages: Pangasinan; Ilocano; Tagalog

Sual, officially the Municipality of Sual (Pangasinan: Baley na Sual; Ilocano: Ili ti Sual; Tagalog: Bayan ng Sual), is a municipality in the province of Pangasinan, Philippines. According to the 2024 census, it has a population of 38,625 people.

It is one of the towns where the Spanish galleon brought their goods to trade. The Philippines largest coal power plant, the 1,200 megawatt Sual Power Station, is located in this municipality. It used to be owned by Mirant Services LLC.

== History ==
Sual used to be a part of a town called San Isidro Labrador de Tobuang (now called Labrador). However, Sual would separate from this town when an issue was decreed by the Spanish Governor-General Rafael María de Aguilar y Ponce de León. San Isidro was later made part of Sual from 1903 to 1908.

Naval Base Lingayen built a PT boat base at Sual in 1945.

On November 18, 1986, Vice Mayor Fernando R. de la Cruz was assassinated in Barangay Paitan West by unknown gunmen while on his way home with two companions. De la Cruz was then the vice chairman of the Pangasinan chapter of the Bagong Alyansang Makabayan (Bayan) when the shooting took place.

In May 1994, President Fidel V. Ramos ordered the construction of a canal in Quezon similar to the Suez Canal to directly link the Pacific Ocean with the South China Sea. During an inspection of the 700-megawatt Pagbilao thermal power plant being built by Hong Kong-based Hopewell Holdings Ltd., Ramos also discussed several infrastructure proposals with firm officials, including a six-lane highway linking Manila to Pagbilao, an extension of the South Luzon Expressway (also known as the South Superhighway) to Batangas and Quezon, and a highway connecting the Pagbilao plant to the Sual plant. However, the idea was never materialized.

=== Maritime issues ===
In January 2008, Bolinao Mayor Alfonso Celeste said the local government will file for damages against the Indonesian owners of the barge APOL 3003. The University of the Philippines Marine Science Institute (UPMSI) stated that the environmental damage was ₱54.9 million. The barge towed by a tug boat from Indonesia to the power plant in Sual on November 27 when Typhoon Mina destroyed its anchor and rope, then hurled it to Ilog Malino reef, spilling 95% of its coal cargo. The hard coal spill spread to 33 hectares (82 acres) of coral and sea grass areas.

== Geography ==
Sual is situated 20.06 kilometres (12.46 mi) from the provincial capital Lingayen, and 228.99 kilometres (142.29 mi) from the country's capital city of Manila. It is between Alaminos, Pangasinan and Labrador on the Olongapo–Bugallon Road.

=== Barangays ===
Sual is politically subdivided into 19 barangays. Each barangay consists of puroks and some have sitios.

- Baquioen
- Baybay Norte
- Baybay Sur
- Bolaoen
- Cabalitian
- Calumbuyan
- Camagsingalan
- Caoayan
- Capantolan
- Macaycayawan
- Paitan East
- Paitan West
- Pangascasan
- Poblacion
- Santo Domingo
- Seselangen
- Sioasio East
- Sioasio West
- Victoria

=== Climate ===
Climate data for Sual, Pangasinan
Month	Jan	Feb	Mar	Apr	May	Jun	Jul	Aug	Sep	Oct	Nov	Dec	Year
Mean daily maximum °C (°F)	31 (88)	31 (88)	31 (88)	33 (91)	32 (90)	32 (90)	30 (86)	30 (86)	30 (86)	31 (88)	31 (88)	31 (88)	31 (88)
Mean daily minimum °C (°F)	21 (70)	21 (70)	22 (72)	24 (75)	24 (75)	24 (75)	23 (73)	23 (73)	23 (73)	23 (73)	23 (73)	22 (72)	23 (73)
Average precipitation mm (inches)	5.1 (0.20)	11.6 (0.46)	21.1 (0.83)	27.7 (1.09)	232.9 (9.17)	350.8 (13.81)	679.8 (26.76)	733.1 (28.86)	505 (19.9)	176.6 (6.95)	67.2 (2.65)	17.7 (0.70)	2,828.6 (111.38)
Average rainy days	3	3	3	4	14	18	23	25	22	15	8	4	142
Source: World Weather Online

== Demographics ==
Population census of Sual
Year	Pop.	±% p.a.
1903	2,986	—
1918	4,286	+2.44%
1939	6,396	+1.92%
1948	7,458	+1.72%
1960	9,412	+1.96%
1970	12,528	+2.90%
1975	14,367	+2.78%
1980	15,796	+1.91%
1990	19,594	+2.18%
1995	20,929	+1.24%
2000	25,832	+4.62%
2007	29,925	+2.05%
2010	31,216	+1.55%
2015	34,149	+1.73%
2020	39,091	+2.89%
2024	38,625	−0.29%
Source: Philippine Statistics Authority

== Economy ==
Poverty incidence of Sual (%)

Source: Philippine Statistics Authority

== Government ==
=== Local government ===
Sual is part of the first congressional district of the province of Pangasinan. It is governed by a mayor, designated as its local chief executive, and by a municipal council as its legislative body in accordance with the Local Government Code. The mayor, vice mayor, and the councilors are elected directly by the people through an election which is being held every three years.

=== Elected officials ===
Members of the Sual Municipal Government (2025–2028)
Position	Name
Congressman	Arthur F. Celeste (NP)
Municipal Mayor	Liseldo D. Calugay (API)
Municipal Vice-Mayor	Maximo D. Millan (API)
Municipal Councilors	Mherlie I. Osana (API)
Municipal Councilors	Dioneil G. Caburao (NPC)
Municipal Councilors	Gregorio G. Garcia Jr. (API)
Municipal Councilors	Nelson U. Fontanilla (API)
Municipal Councilors	Melody R. Beltran (NPC)
Municipal Councilors	Alexander D. Rigonan Jr. (API)
Municipal Councilors	Samson Paulo Brudo (API)
Municipal Councilors	Kenberly O. Edrosolan (API)

== Tourism ==
- St. Peter the Martyr Parish Church
- Limahong Beach Resort in Cabalitian island

== Education ==
The Sual Schools District Office governs all educational institutions within the municipality. It oversees the management and operations of all private and public, from primary to secondary schools.

=== Primary and elementary schools ===
- Baquioen Elementary School
- Ballog Elementary School
- Batidape Comm.Sch.
- Baybay Elementary School
- Bolaoen Elementary School
- Caarosipan Elementary School
- Cabalitian Elementary School
- Cacao Elementary School
- Calombuyan Elementary School
- JETSOO School
- Raymunda Verzosa Elementary School
- Macaycayawan Elementary School
- Modesto V. Ferrer Elementary School
- Napo-Logolog Elementary School
- Seselangen Elementary School
- Sioasio Elementary School
- Sto. Domingo Elementary School
- Sual Catholic School
- Sual Central School

=== Secondary schools ===
- Paitan Integrated School
- Pangascasan Integrated School
- St. Peter Martyr Academy
- Sual National High School

== Gallery ==
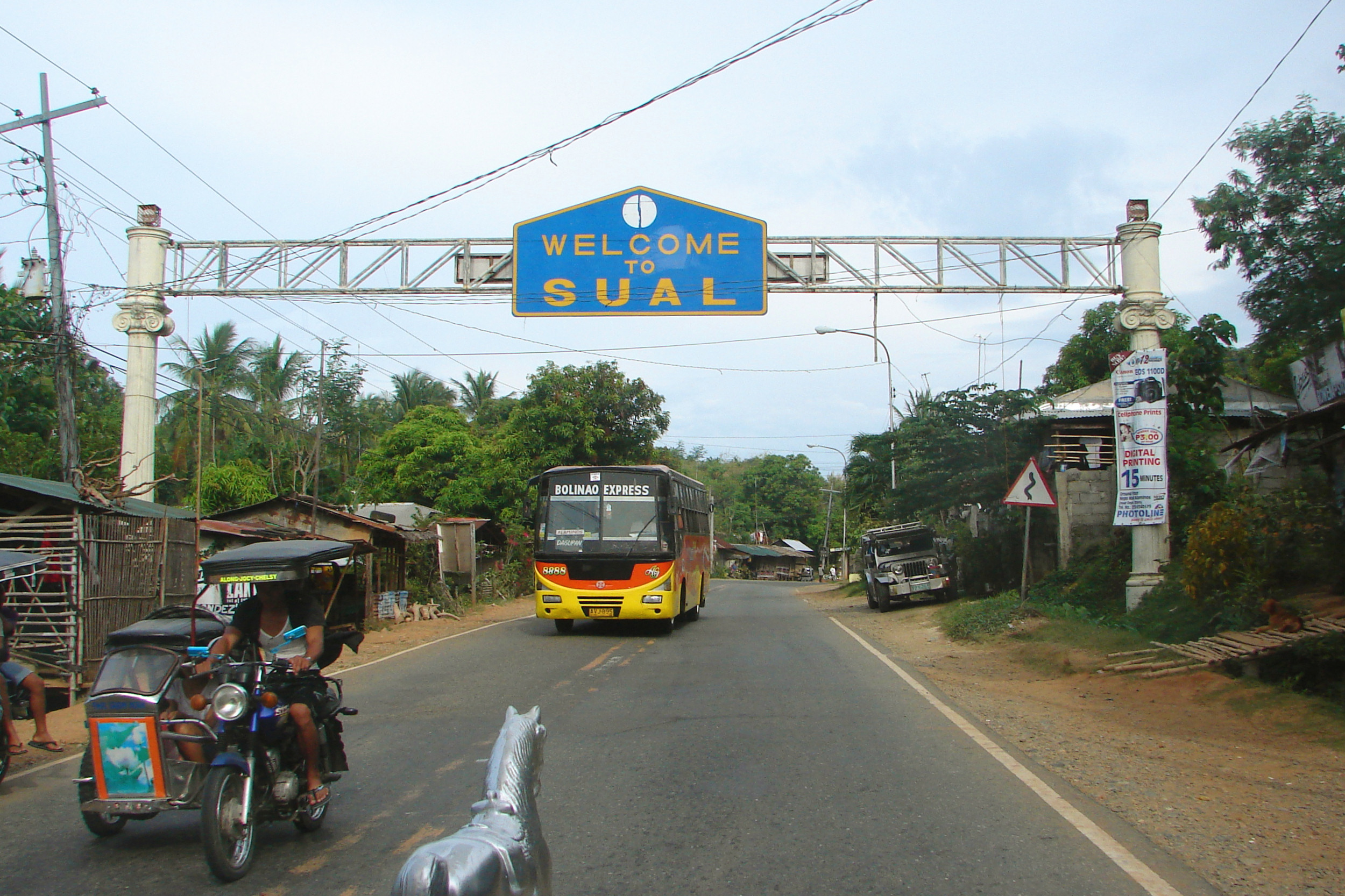
Welcome sign

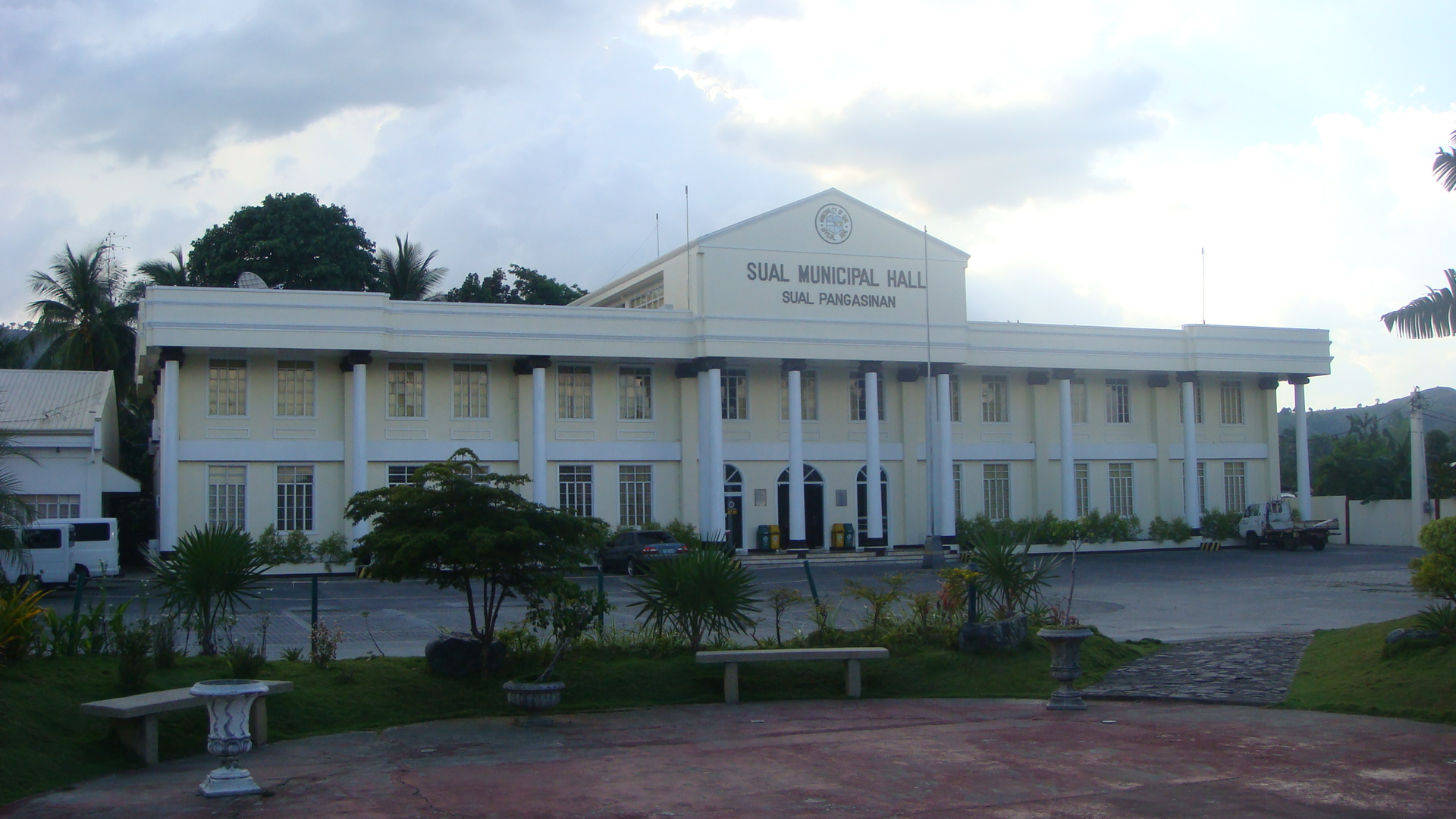
Sual Municipal Hall

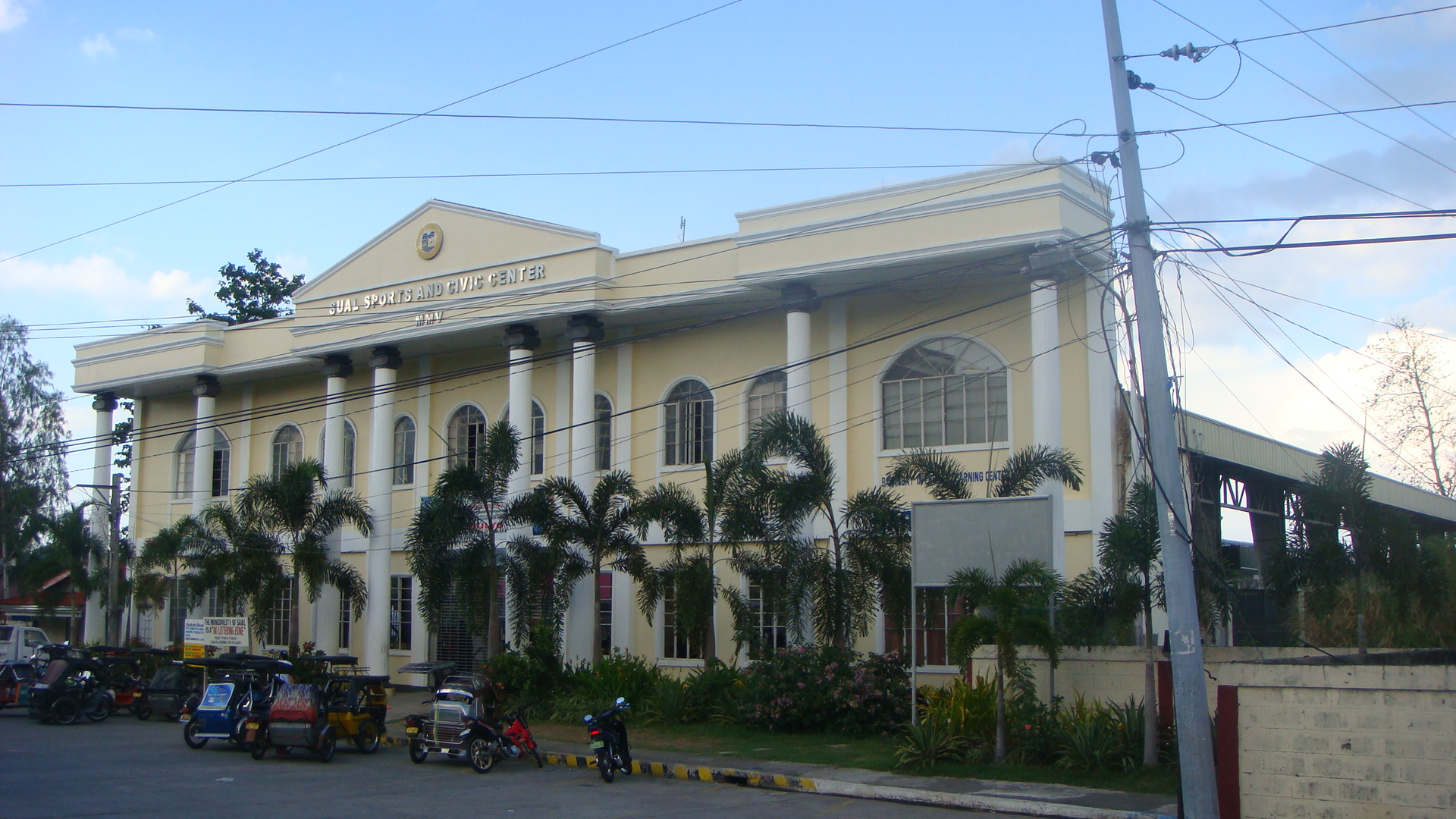
Sual Sports and Civic Center

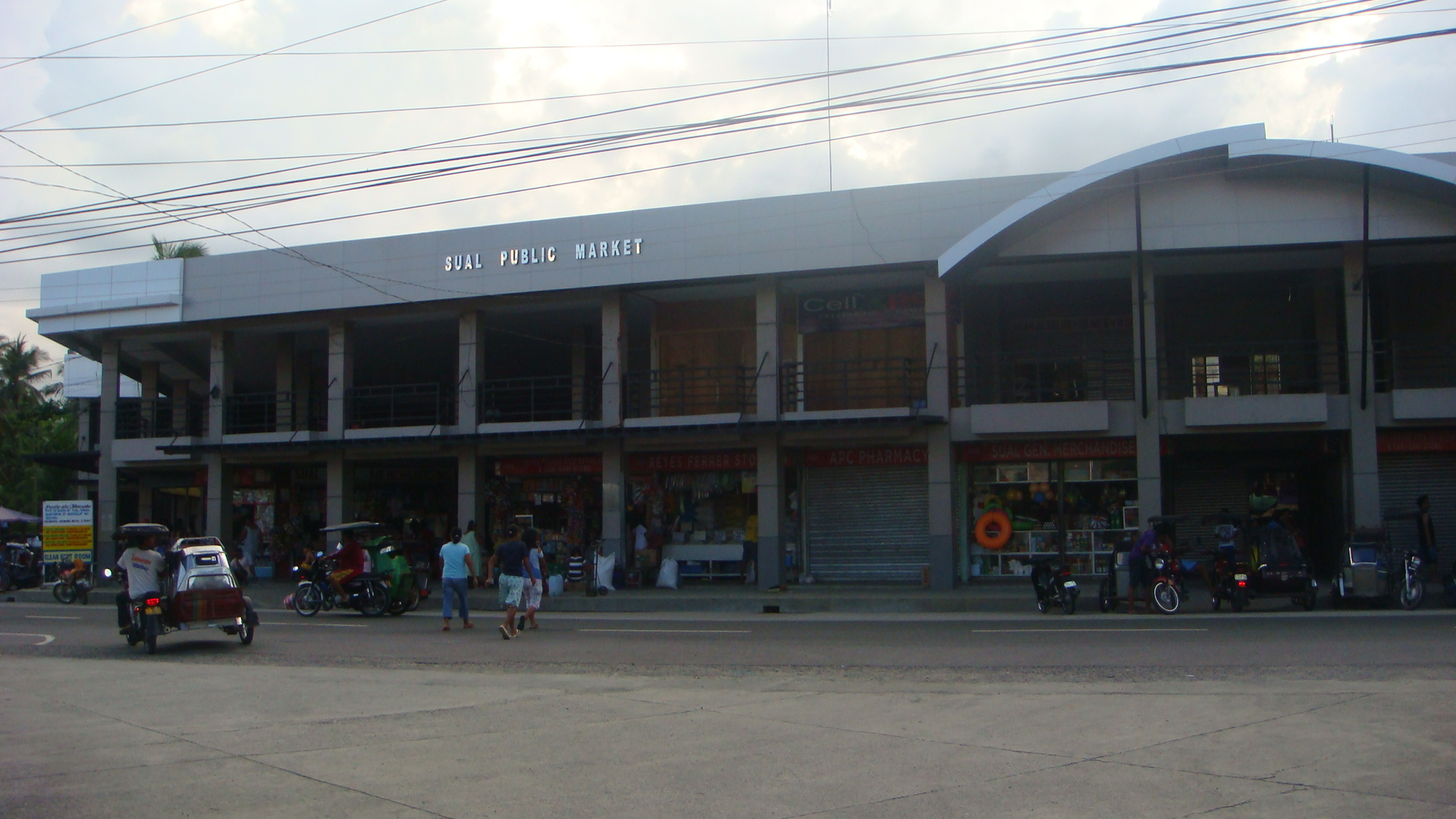
Sual Public Market (Poblacion)

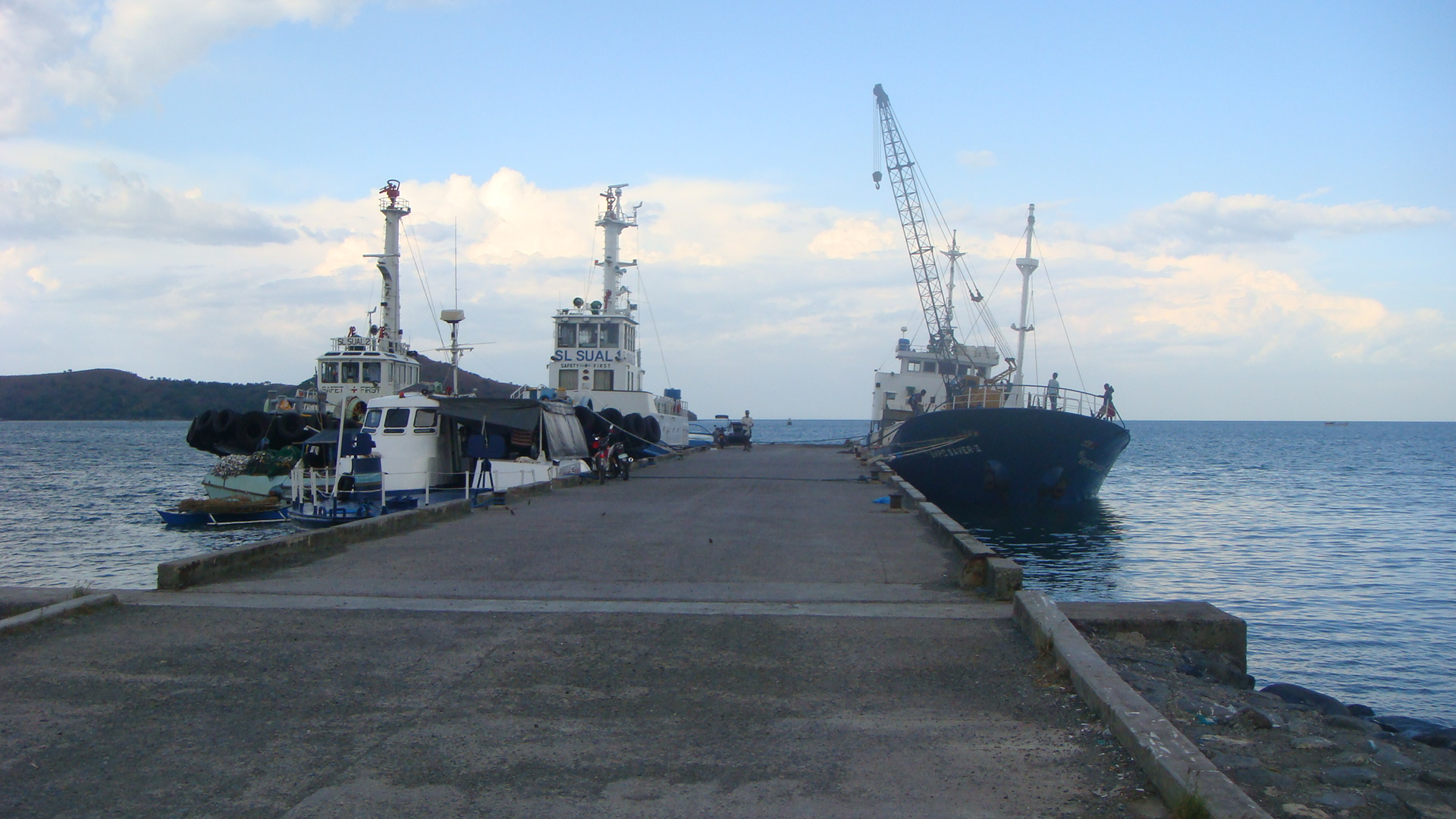
Tugboats and small vessels in the Fish Port Complex

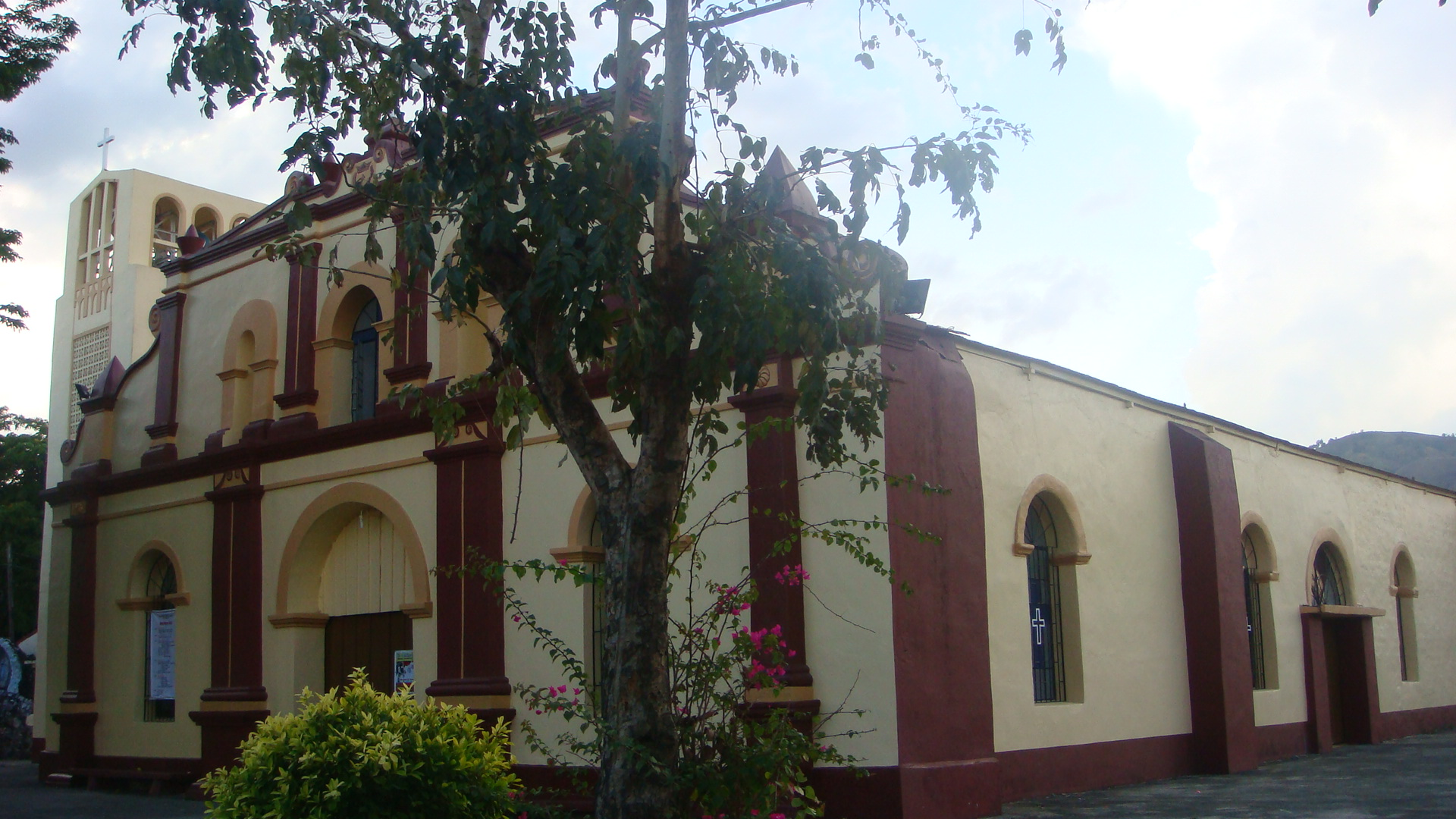
San Pedro Martir Parish Church (Poblacion)

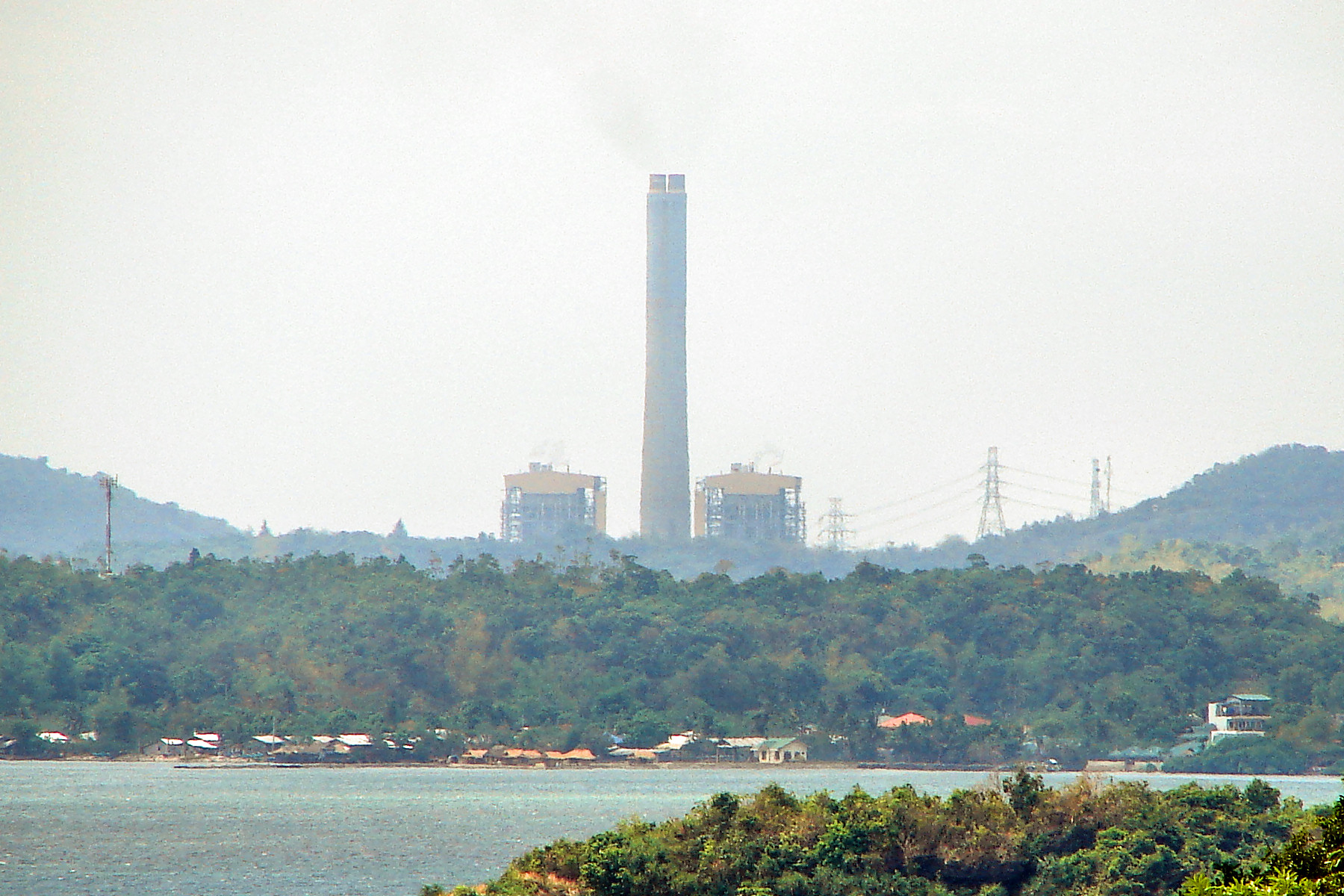
Sual Power Station
