= Naval Base Lingayen =

Former Major United States Navy Base in Philippines

- Lingayen Gulf, Luzon, Philippines
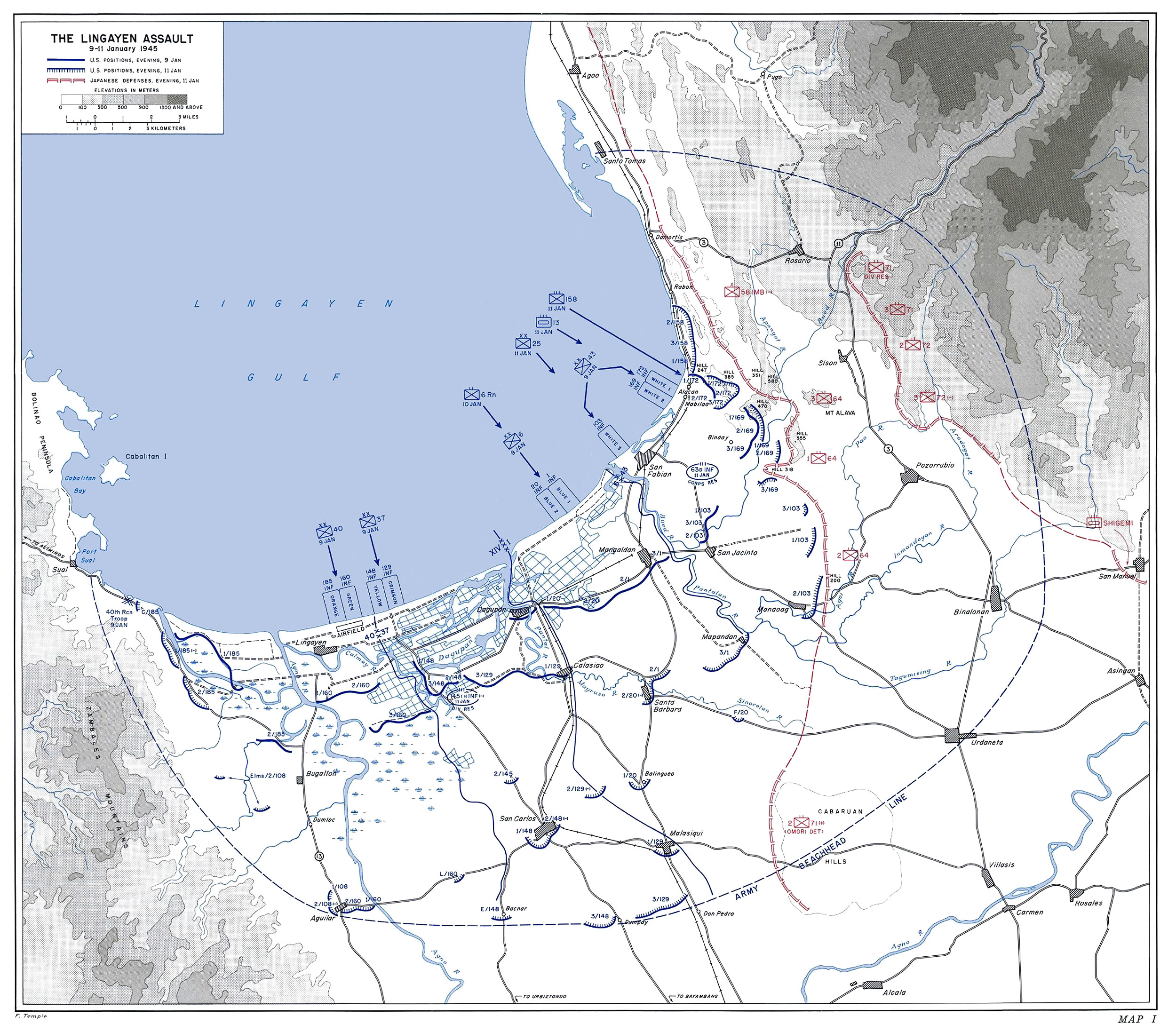
- Lingayen Gulf with landing spots January 1945

Site information
- Type: Naval base
- Operator: United States Navy

Location
- Coordinates: 16°17′N 120°12′E

Site history
- Built: 1945

Seabees unloading ships at Lingayen Gulf, Luzon in January 1945

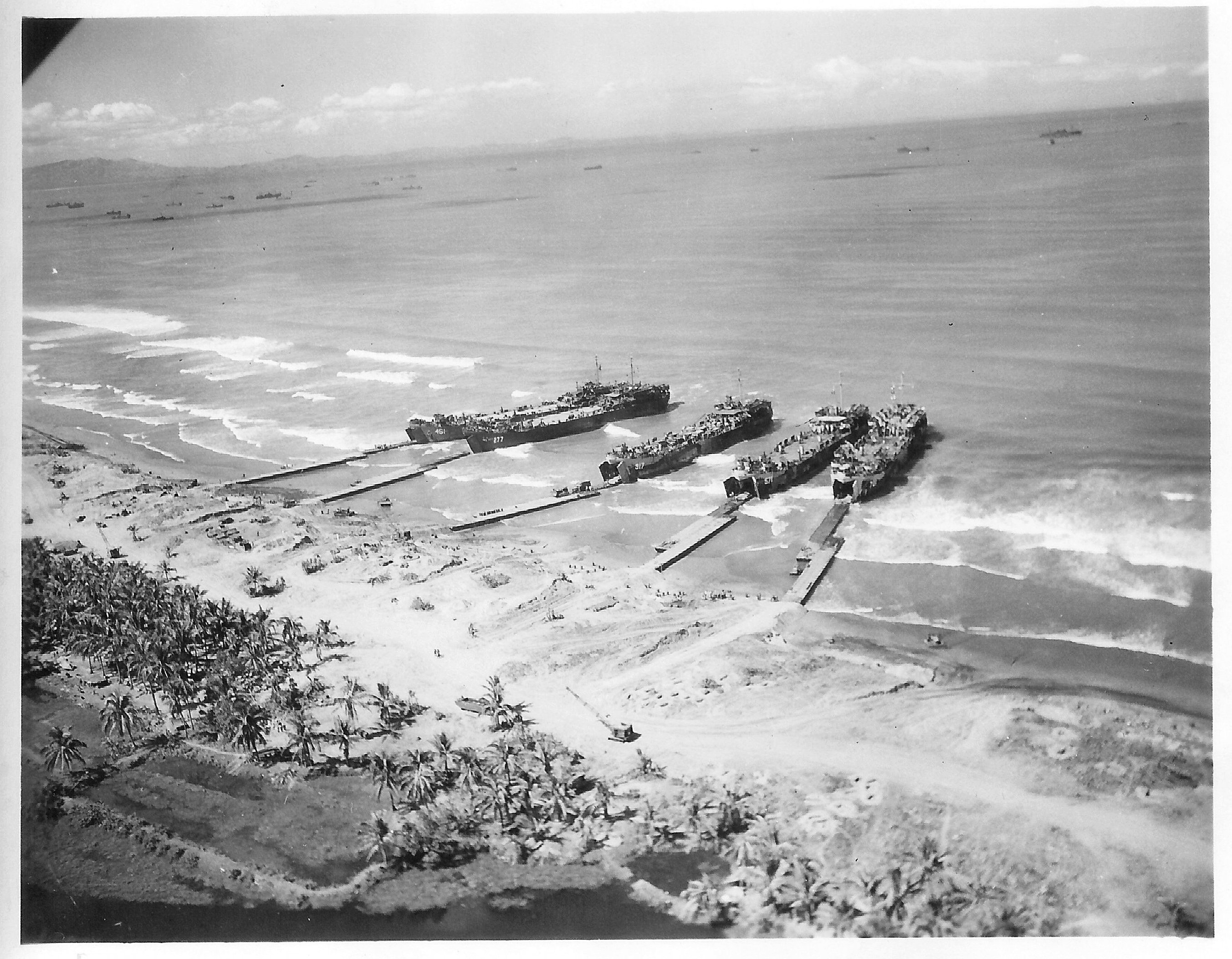
LST-917 and other LST ships unloading at Lingayen Gulf January 1945

Lingayen Gulf January 1945 with beach runway, Lingayen Airfield

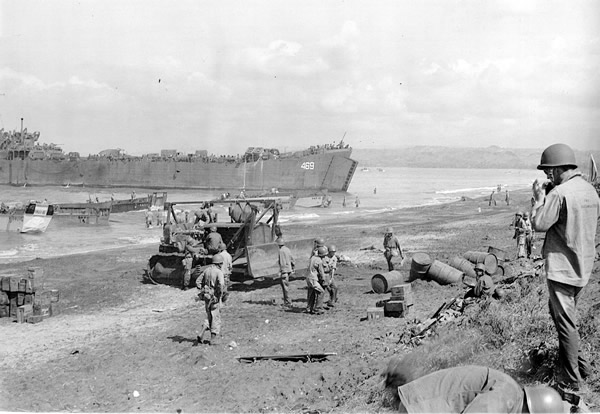
Navy Seabee bulldozer working on the invasion of Lingayen Gulf

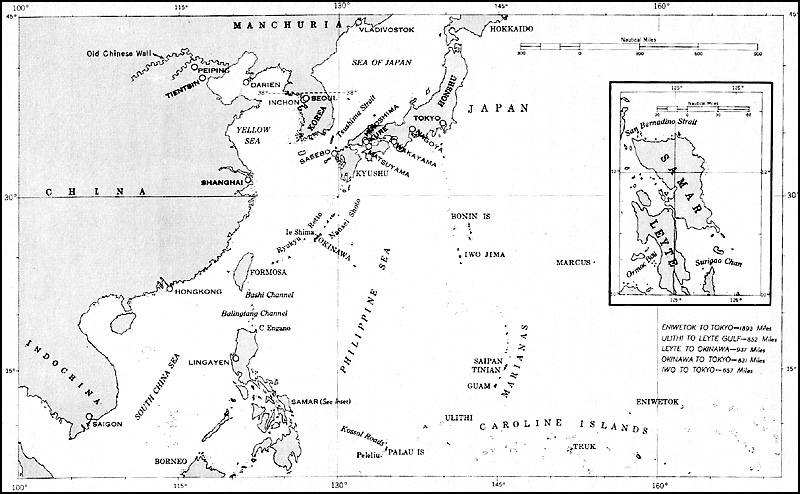
Map 1945 with China, Japan, and the Philippines, with South Pacific War sites

Naval Base Lingayen was a United States Navy base built during World War II at Lingayen Gulf on the northwestern Island of Luzon in the Philippines. The base was founded after the Invasion of Lingayen Gulf on January 9, 1945, at Lingayen city and the surrounding gulf. The Naval base was used to support the later operations at Manila and the rest of Luzon Island and then at Okinawa. Lingayen Gulf offered excellent fleet anchorage.

== History ==
US Navy Seabee pontoon battalion landed with the troops at Lingayen on January 9, 1945. The Seabee task was building pontoon piers out into Lingayen Gulf so the massive about of supplies needed for the invasion could be unloaded quickly. Over 90% of the invasion supplies were unloaded on the pontoon piers. Seabee built a Naval Base Headquarters at the city of San Fernando on the north east side of Lingayen Gulf. A supply depot was built at Lingayen, US Navy Advance Base 6. The US Army had its Headquarters at San Fernando also, called Base M. The Army had a number of camps around Lingayen Gulf.

== Bases and facilities ==
- San Fernando, La Union Naval section base, Harbor HQ, Base HQ
  - Radar station
  - Naval hospital
  - Fleet anchorage
  - Fleet Post office 3960 SF
  - Boat pool (to get to ships and other Lingayen Gulf facilities)
  - Look out tower
  - Base camp

Lingayen Gulf:

- Pier
- Supply depot, Army and Navy
- Seabee Camp
- Seabee depot
- Seabee sawmill
- Coral quarry
- Camp, barracks and mess hall
- Power plant
- Ammunition depot
- Aviation gasoline Tank farm
- USS Quapaw (ATF-110) tug
- USS Piedmont (AD-17) destroyer tender
- USS Agawam (AOG-6) Gas tanker
- USS Severn (AO-61) Fleet oiler
- USS Thuban (AKA-19) Stores Ship

== PT Boat Sual Bay ==
A large PT boat Base was built at Sual Bay's port of Sual at Sual at 16.078°N 120.102°E. Motor torpedo boat tender USS Wachapreague (AGP-8) help keep the boat supplied and running.

== Airfields ==
- Lingayen Airfield at the Lingayen beach, (6th Army) now Lingayen Airport.
- San Fernando Airfield near Naval Base Headquarters at San Fernando, now San Fernando Airport.
- Mangaldan Airfield US Marines, near Port of Lingayen, abandoned after war.
- Rosales Airfield inland Airfield, now Rosales Airport.

=== Seaplane Base Lingayen ===
Seaplane base was built in Cabalitan Bay at Cabalitan Island at 16.111°N 120.120°E The seaplane were served by the seaplane tenders: USS Barataria (AVP-33) and USS Currituck (AV-7). Later the Seaplane base was moved to Sual Bay. The US Navy's VPB-71, Patrol Bombing Squadron 71, operated Consolidated PBY Catalina type PBY-5A, called "Black Cat" out of the seaplane bases. On February 28, 1945, VP-28 arrived operating Martin PBM Mariners. The Black Cat and Martin PBM, did antisubmarine patrols and attacked Empire of Japan shipping in the South China Sea. The USS Tangier (AV-8) took over the seaplane tender duties on March 13. US Navy Seabees built seaplane ramps and bases both at Sual Bay and Cabalitan Island.

== Seabee units ==
- 115th Construction Battalion
- 102nd Construction Battalion
- 1st Special Naval Construction Battalion, Sept. 1945 only
- Naval Construction Maintenance Unit 606
- Seabee Pontoon battalion

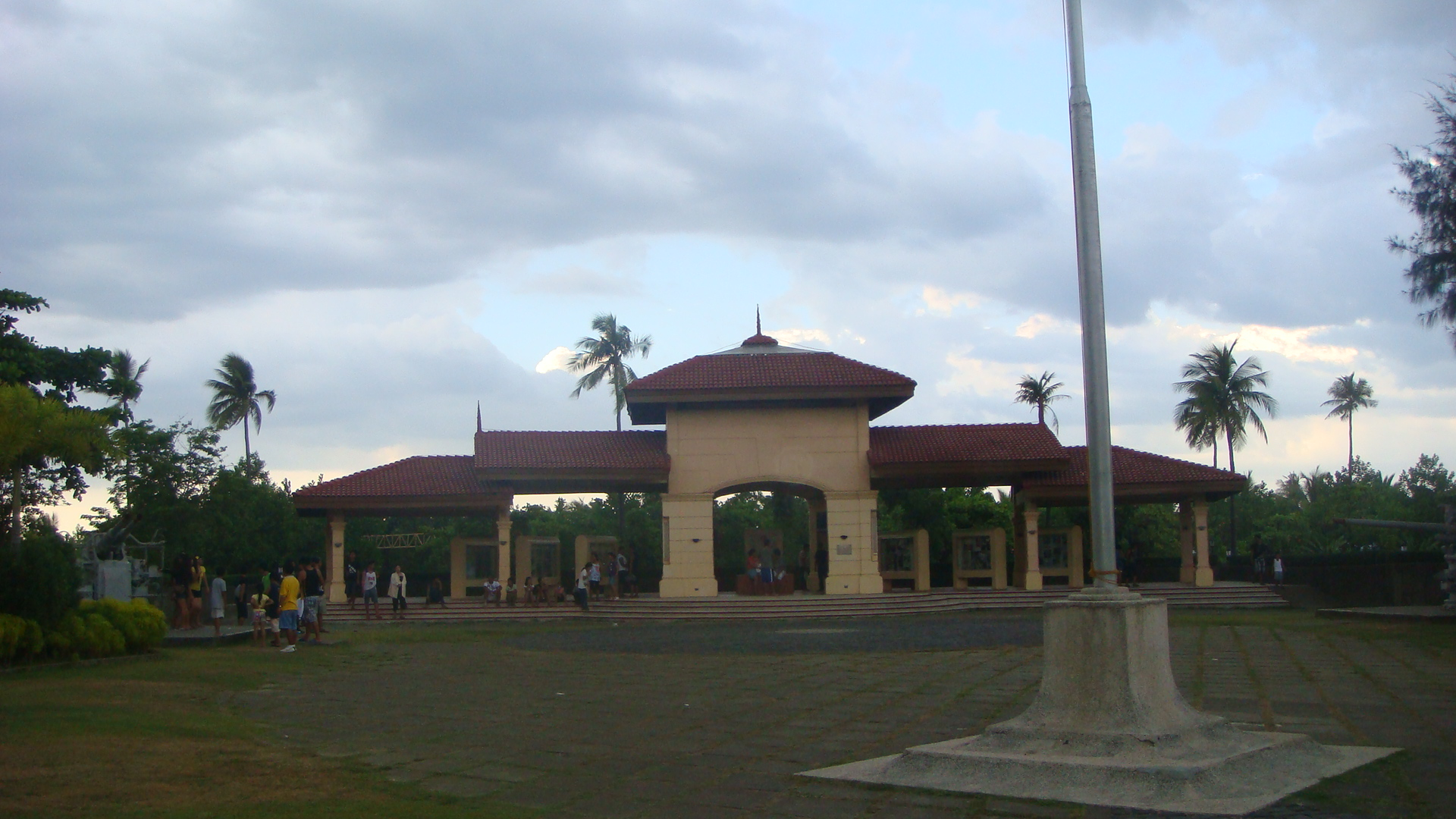
World War II Memorial Ground Site, Town Park & Capitol Grounds (Lingayen, Pangasinan).

== Loses ==
The invasion of Lingayen Gulf was costly for the US Navy, from December 14, 1944, to January 13, 1945, 24 ships were sunk and 67 were damaged by kamikaze attack planes. In the attacks, 746 seamen were killed and 1,365 wounded. Most of the ships were with the United States Third Fleet and United States Seventh Fleet, Task Group 77.2. Many of the ships had come from Naval Base Ulithi staging. A few ships were damaged in Lingayen Gulf by small maru-ni boats, that had depth charges. LST-925 and LST-1028 were damaged by a maru-ni boats (US calling them torpedo boats at the time) from Sual. The USS Philip (DD-498), USS Robinson (DD-562) and USS Leutze were able to stop maru-ni boats before they attacked, 45 maru-ni boats were lost in total.

Japan landed and took Lingayen on December 22, 1941. US and Filipino Troops at Lingayen, retreated to Bataan, most becoming prisoners of war and part of the Bataan Death March in April 1942.

== Post war ==
With two large Naval Bases on Luzon: Naval Base Manila and Naval Base Subic Bay, Naval Base Lingayen was closed after the war.

- Veterans Memorial Park is a park in the city of Lingayen, Pangasinan at 16.034°N 120.231°E.
- 3" Naval Gun and a Twin 40mm Anti-aircraft gun are displayed at Lingayen Capital Compound at 16.033°N 120.231°E.
- San Fernando, La Union World War 2 Tomb of the Unknown Soldier at 16.596677°N 120.318643°E.

== Gallery ==
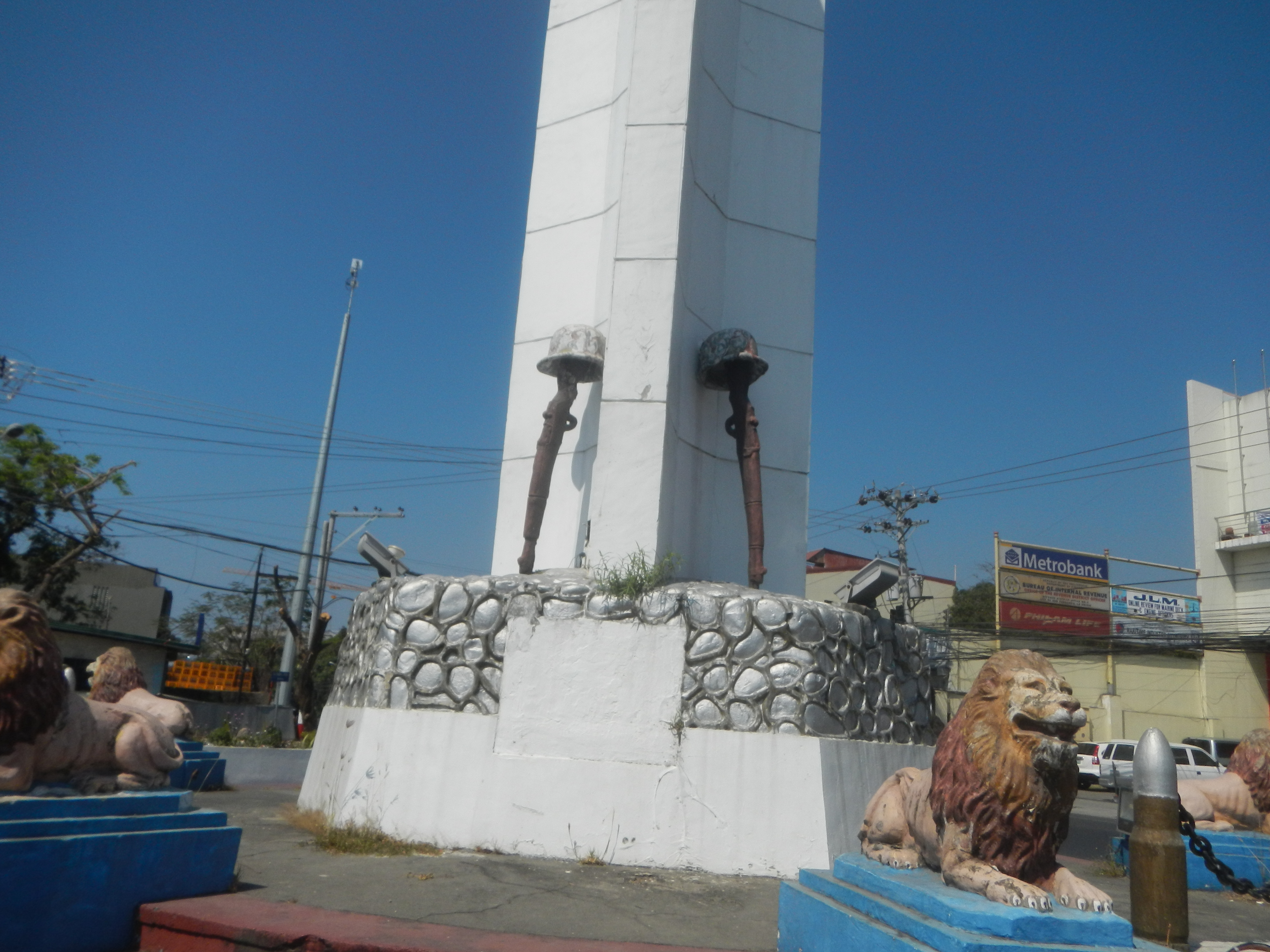
Monument to the Unknown Soldier San Fernando, La Union

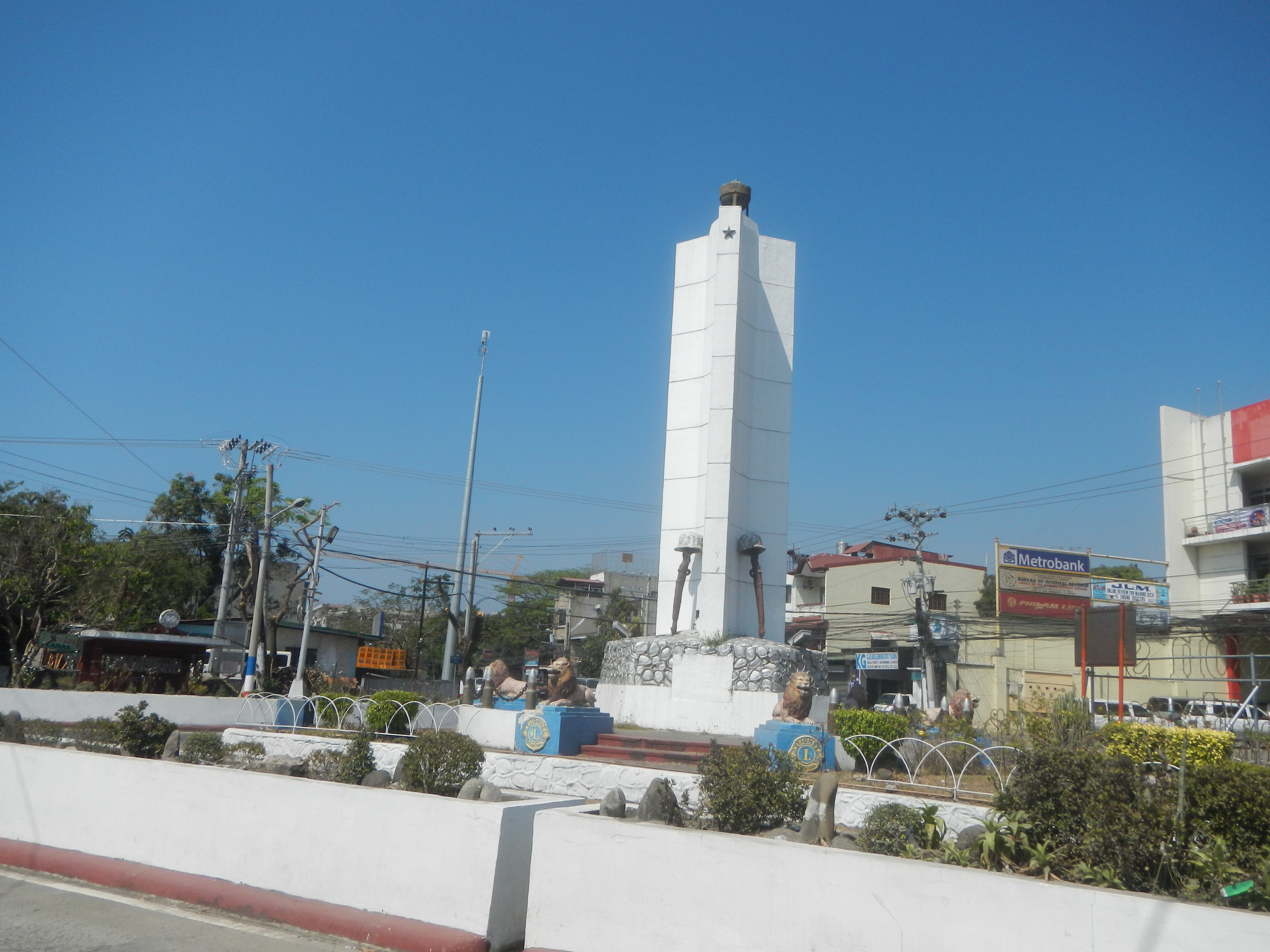
Monument to the Unknown Soldier San Fernando, La Union

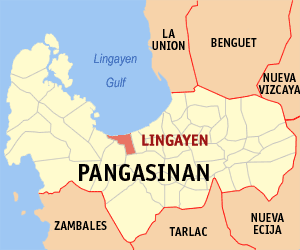
Map Lingayen

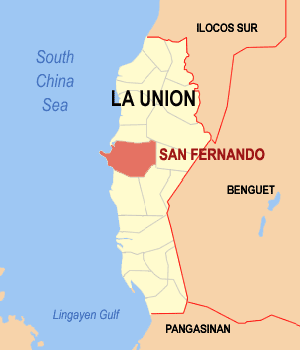
Map San Fernando, La Union

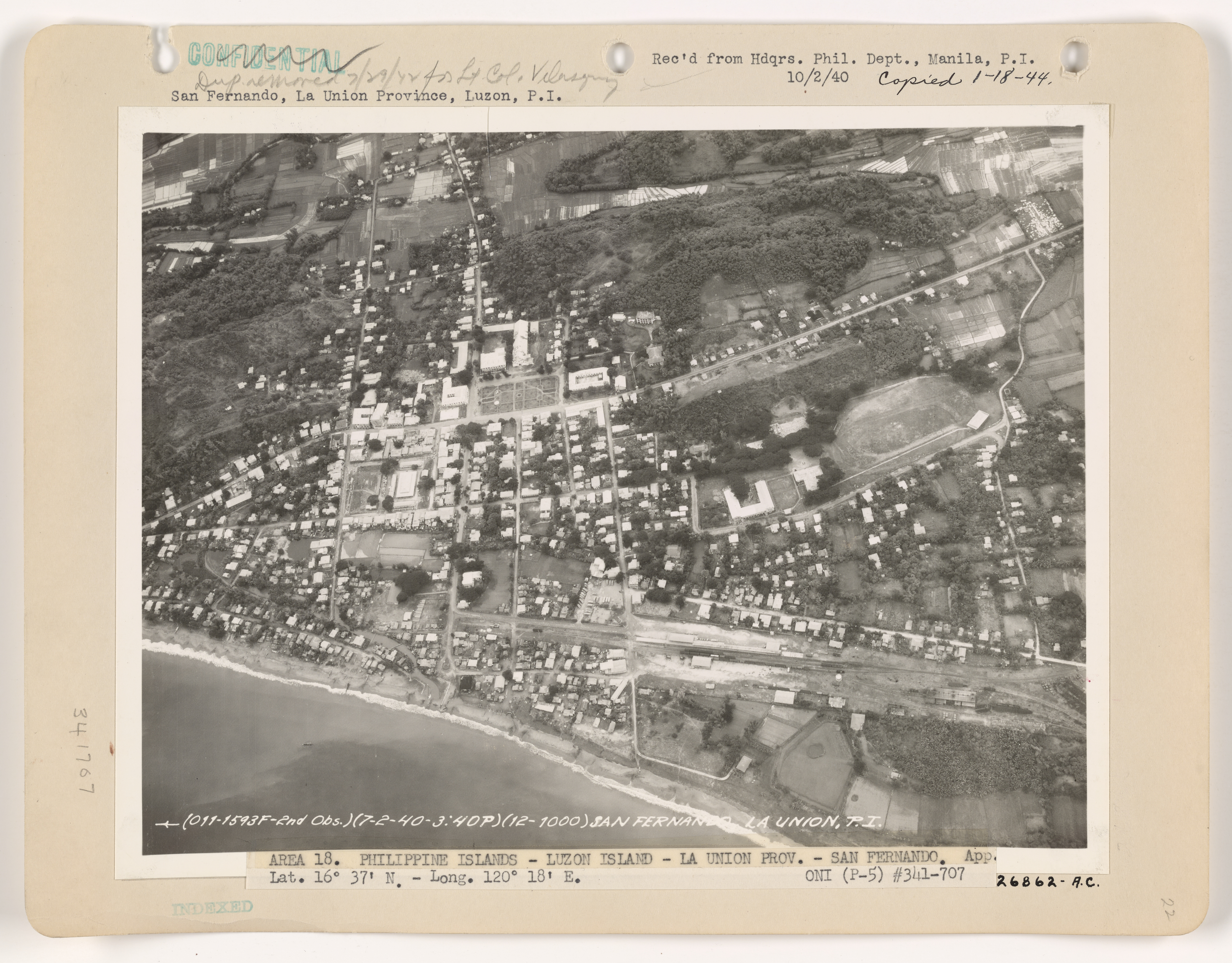
San Fernando, La Union in 1940

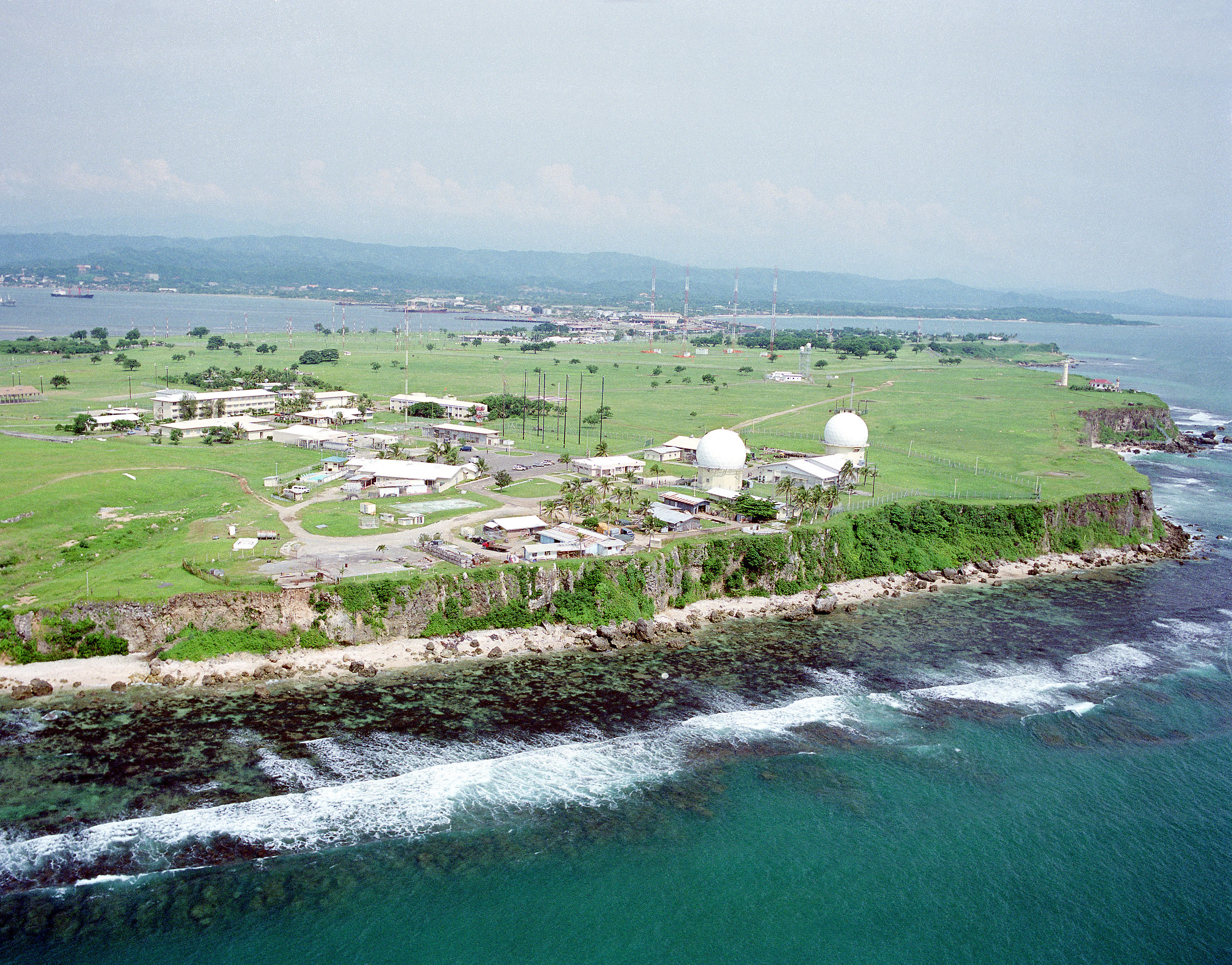
Wallace Air Station, Philippines

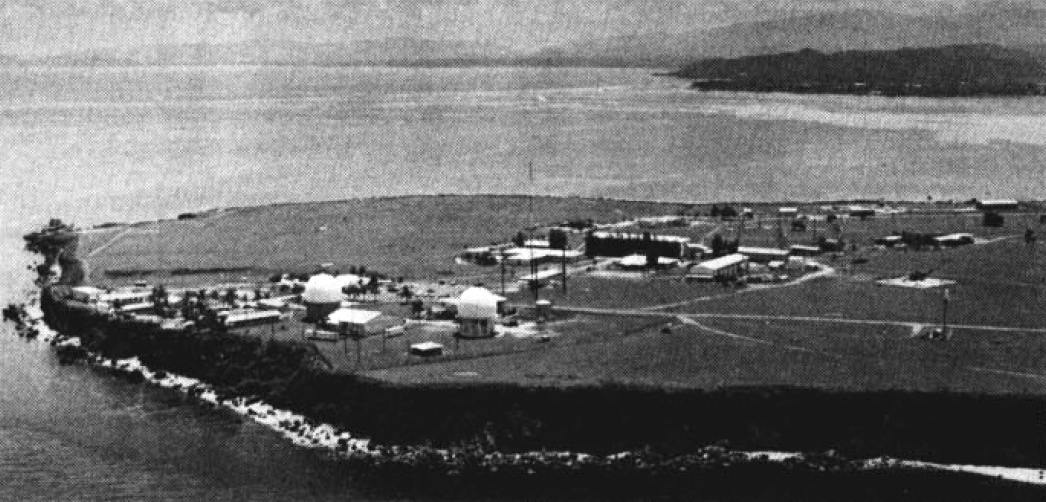
Wallace Air Station

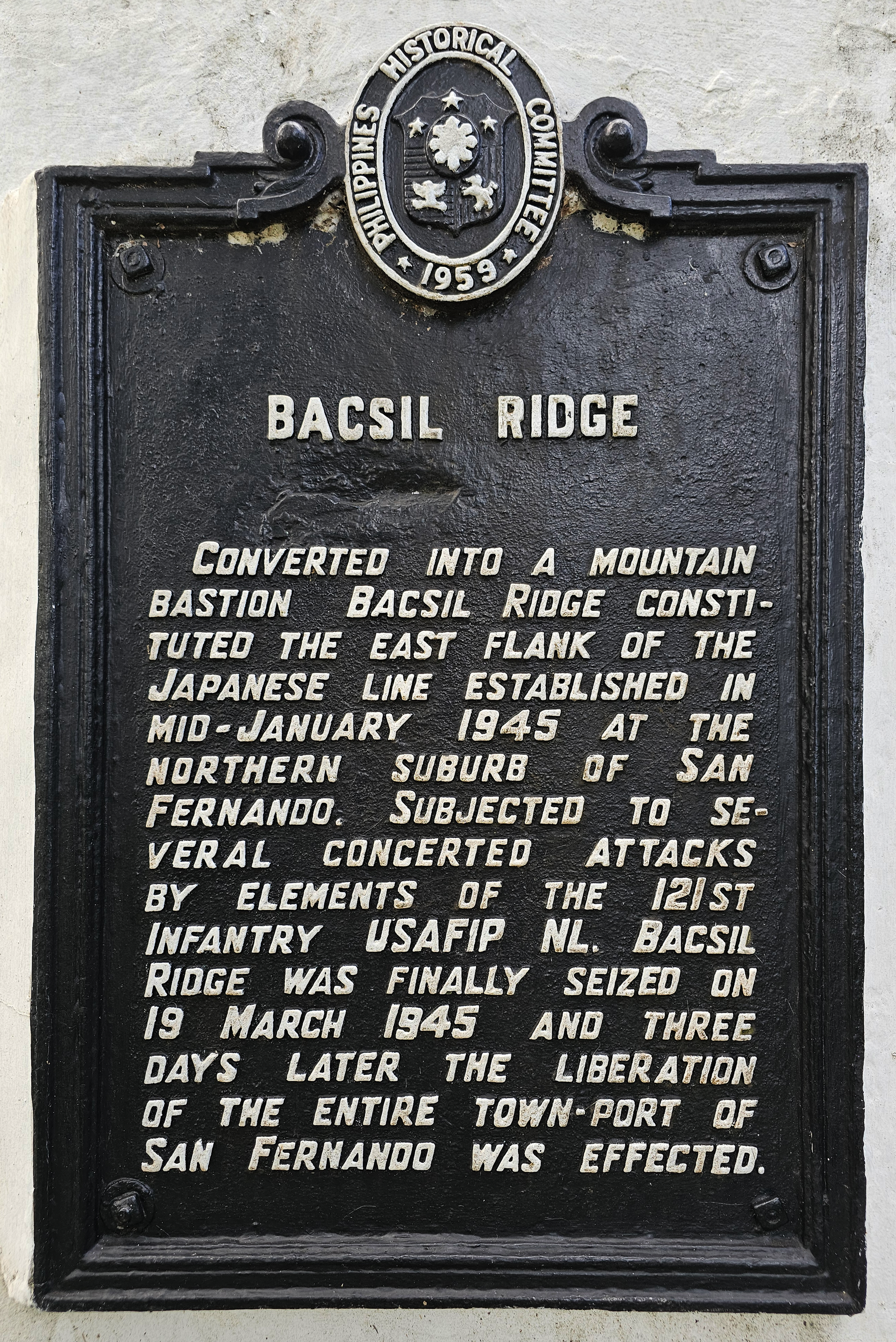
Bacsil Ridge historical marker

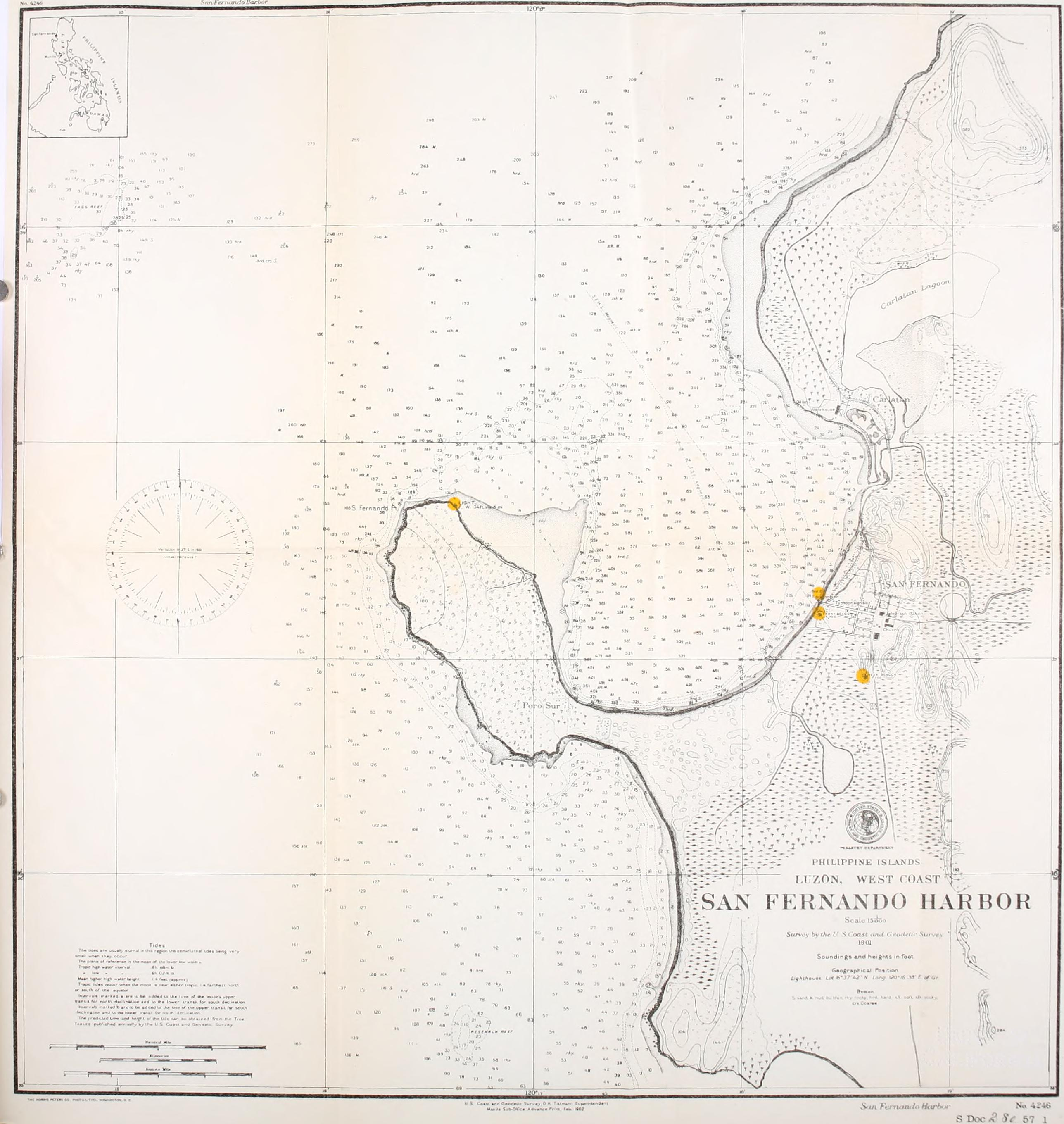
San Fernando, La Union Harbor map

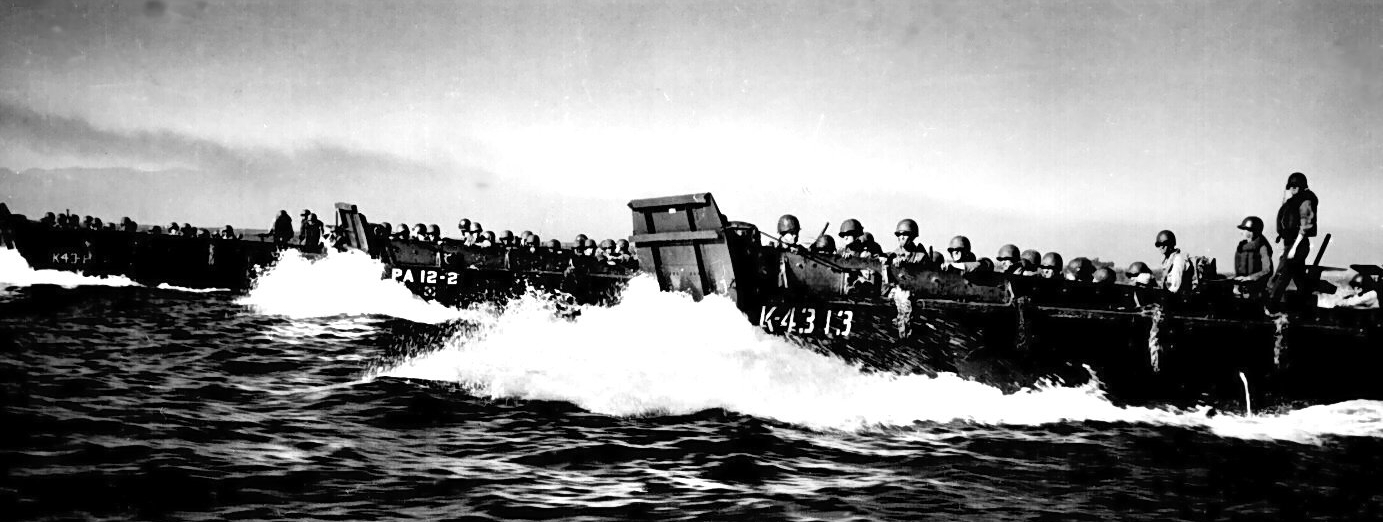
US Coast Guard landing barges at Lingayen Gulf

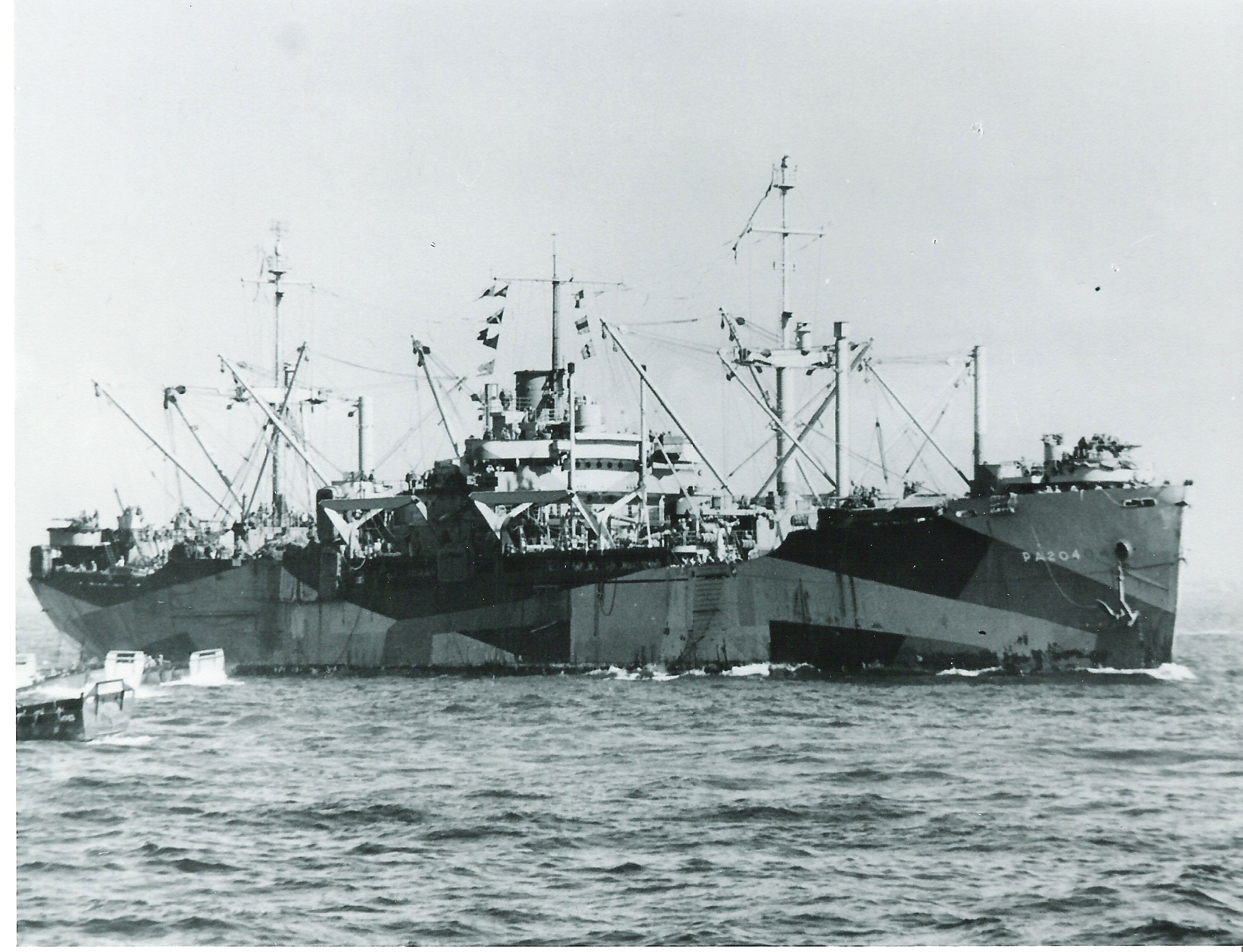
USS Sarasota at Lingayen Gulf in 1945.png

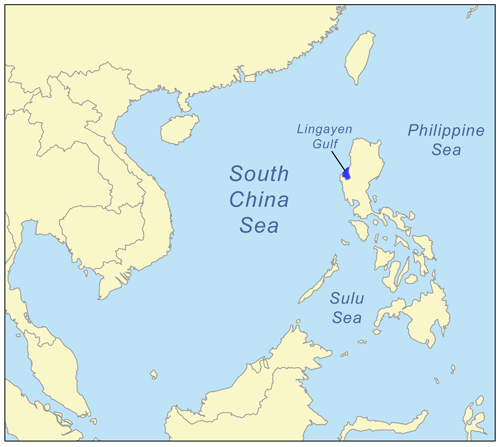
Map Lingayen Gulf

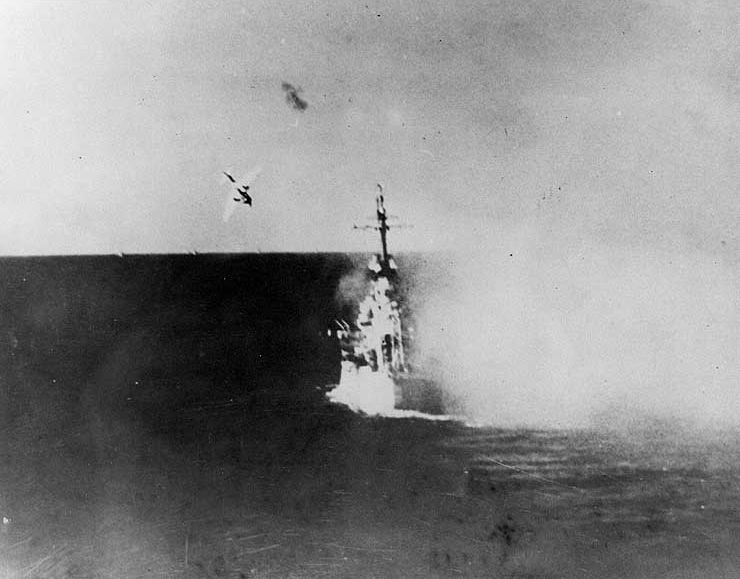
Kamikaze attacks USS Columbia (CL-56) in Lingayen Gulf on 6 January 1945

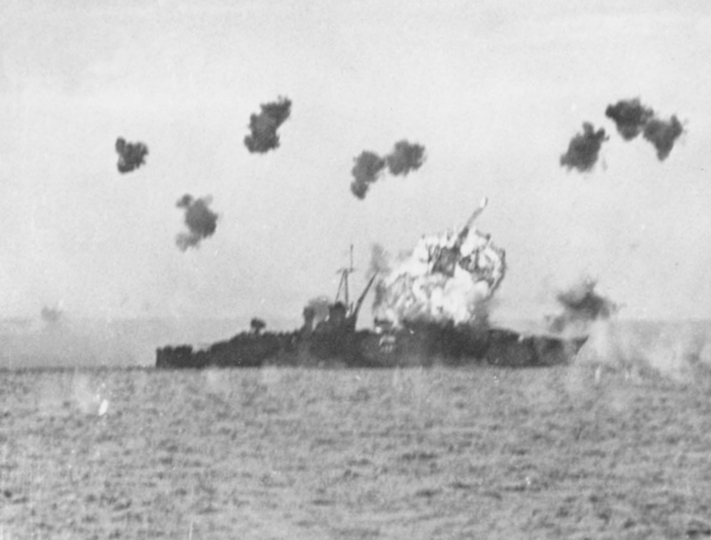
USS Louisville (CA-28) is hit by a kamikaze in Lingayen Gulf on 6 January 1945

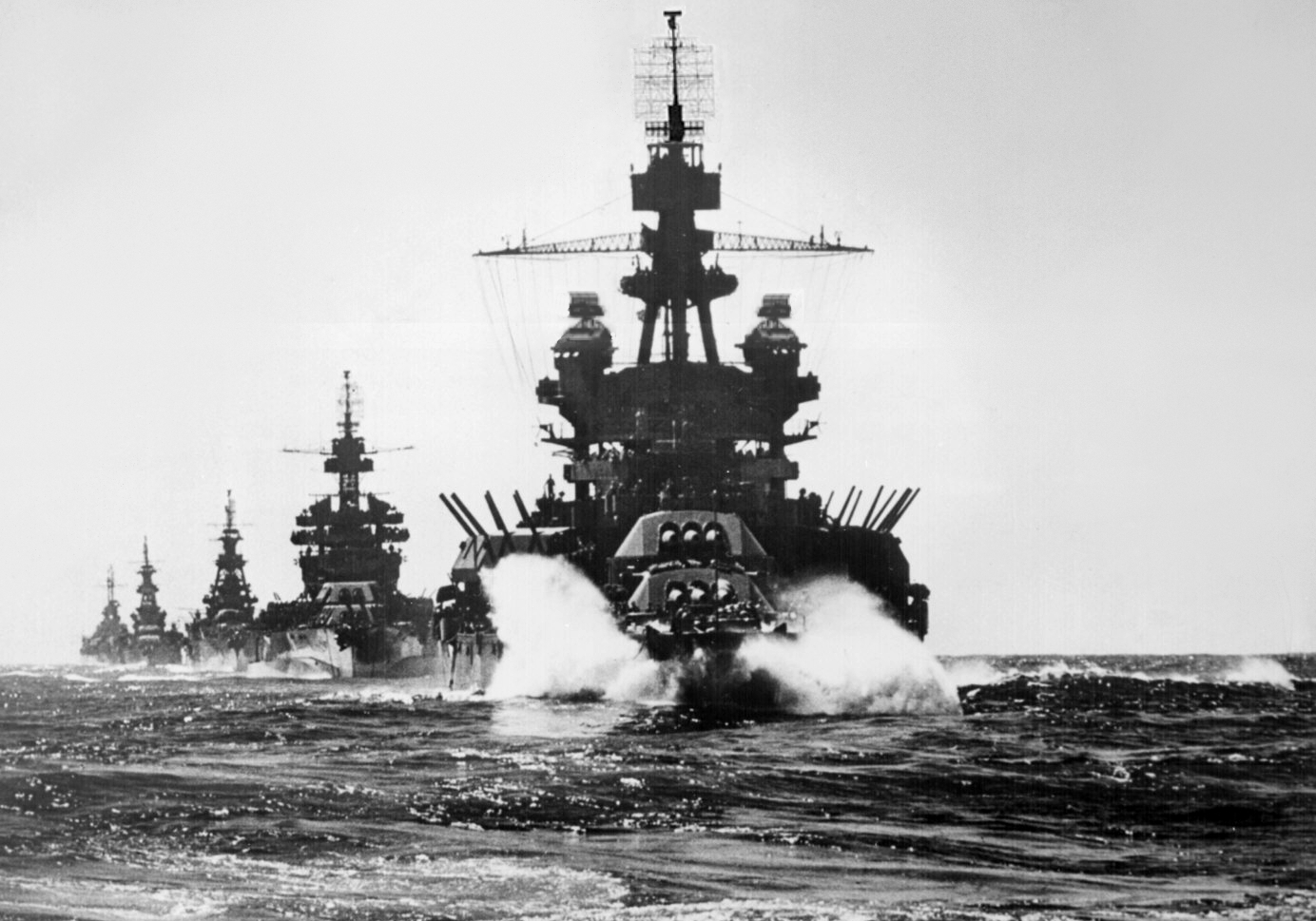
USS Pennsylvania (BB-38) leading USS Colorado (BB-45) and USS Louisville (CA-28) to Lingayen.

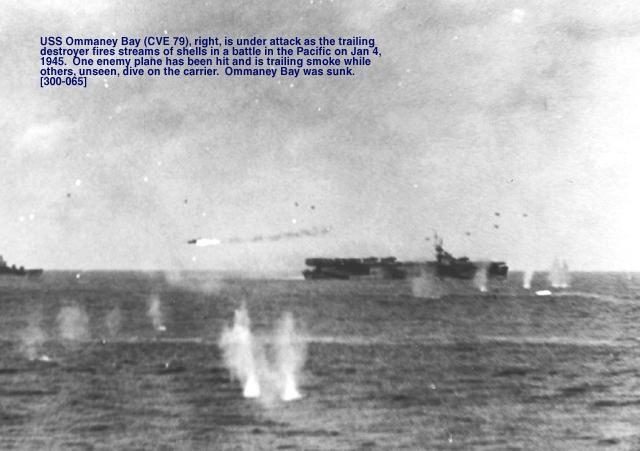
USS Ommaney Bay attacked by kamikaze 3 January 1945

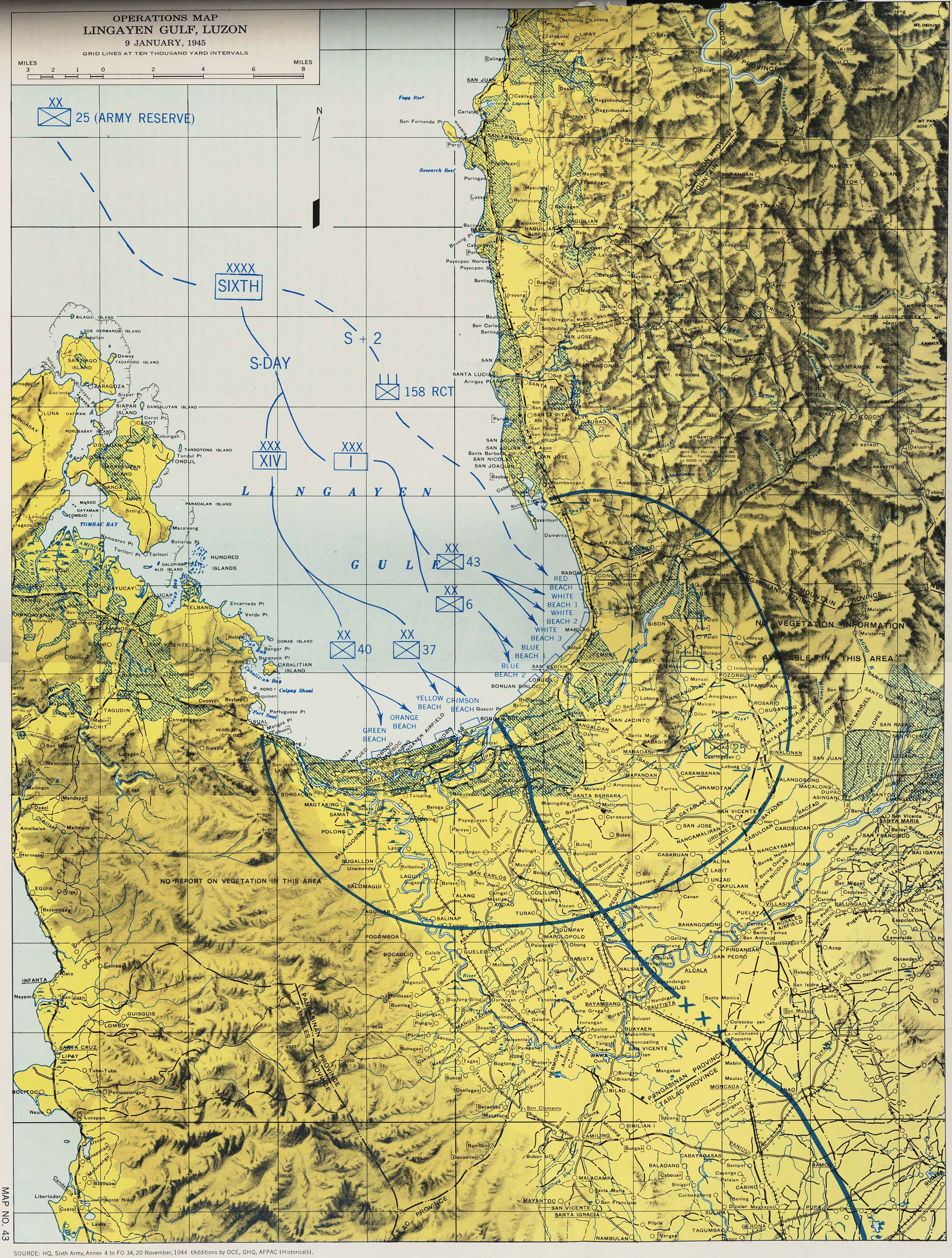
Map Lingayen landing 1945

== See also ==
- US Naval Base Philippines
- Wallace Air Station at San Fernando, La Union
- Battle of Luzon
- US Naval Advance Bases
- Naval Base Milne Bay
- Naval Base Brisbane
