= Sarasota (disambiguation) =

Sarasota is a city in Florida.

Sarasota may also refer to:

- Sarasota County, Florida
- Sarasota Bay
- USS Sarasota, US Navy ship
