= United States naval bases in the Philippines =

Former Major United States Navy Base

United States Navy

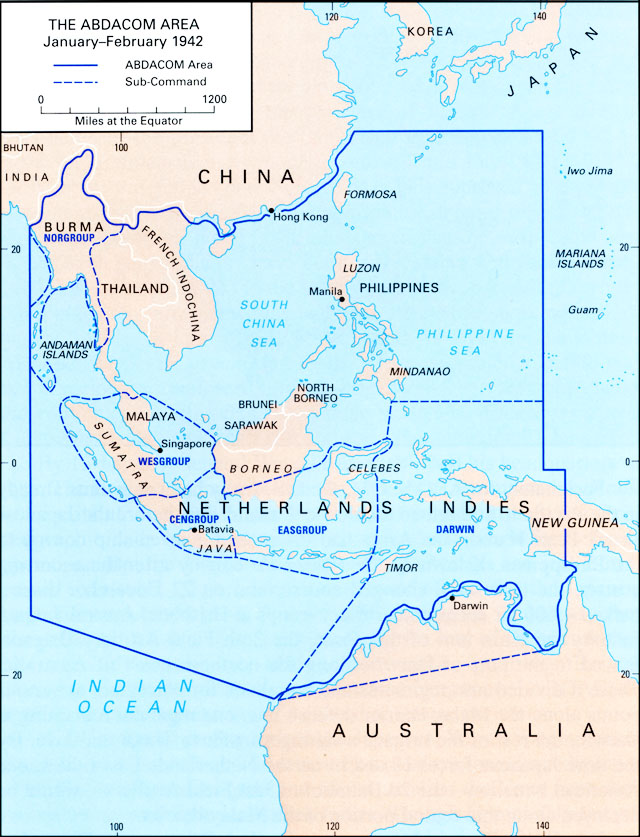
Map of the 1942 American-British-Dutch-Australian Command

The United States Navy held a number of bases in the Philippines Islands in the Pacific Ocean. Most were built by the US Navy Seabees, Naval Construction Battalions, during World War II. The US Naval Bases in Philippines were lost to the Empire of Japan in December 1941 during the Philippines campaign of 1941–1942. In February 1945 the United States Armed Forces retook the Philippines in the Battle of Manila in 1945. Before the captured US bases on Luzon were retaken the US Navy Seabees built a new large base, Leyte-Samar Naval Base, on the Philippine Island of Leyte, starting in October 1944.

== History ==
Naval Base Manila was a major United States Navy base south of the City of Manila, on Luzon. Some of the bases dates back to 1898, the end of the Spanish–American War. Starting in 1938 civilian contractors were used to build new facilities in Manila to prepare for World War II. With the American-British-Dutch-Australian Command (ABDACOM) the Allies tried to limit the advance of Japan. ABDACOM did not have enough troops or supplies to carry out the mission. Work stopped on December 23, 1941, when Manila was declared not defendable against the Empire of Japan southward advance, which took over the city on January 2, 1942, after the US declared it an Open city. Many US Navy ships and submarines escaped the Philippines and traveled south to ports in Borneo. As Japan advanced south into Borneo these vessels fled further south to form the new US Naval Bases in Australia. US Navy personnel, including doctors and some nurses, that did not get evacuated from the bases became POWs with the Troops in the Battle of Bataan. The nurses became known as the Angels of Bataan for their care of the Troop till liberated in February 1945.

US Navy construction and repair started in March 1945 with the taking of Manila in the costly Battle of Manila ending on March 2, 1945. Naval Base Manila supported the Pacific War and remained a major US Naval Advance Base until its closure in 1971. To support the taking of Naval Base Manila, Leyte Gulf was taken first and base construction started on October 20, 1944. Leyte-Samar Naval Base was made of base on both the island of Leyte and the islands of Samar. The US Naval bases for supported troops, ships, submarines, PT boats, seaplanes, supply depots, training camps, fleet recreation facilities, and ship repair depots. To keep supplies following the bases were supplied by the vast II United States Merchant Navy. After the war ended on VJ Day, Leyte Gulf bases closed and the Naval Base Manila remained an US Naval Advance Base till in 1971. After the Invasion of Lingayen Gulf on January 9, 1945, the Seabees built up a Naval Base Lingayen at Lingayen city and the surrounding gulf. In 1944 and 1945 Japan started using kamikaze attacks on US Navy ships in the Philippines. With two large Naval Bases on Luzon: Naval Base Manila and Naval Base Subic Bay, Naval Base Lingayen was closed after the war. Naval Base Subic Bay, like Naval Base Manila was base of Spain lost to the United States in the Battle of Manila Bay 1898. Subic Bay was lost to Japan in 1941 and retaken in January 1945. In 1992 the United States turned Naval Base Subic Bay over to the Philippine Navy.

== Major Philippines Bases ==
- Naval Base Manila FPO# 3142
  - Mariveles Naval Section Base
  - Naval Base Corregidor
  - Sternberg General Hospital
- Naval Station Sangley Point FPO# 961
- Naval Base Cavite FPO# 954
- Naval Base Subic Bay FPO# 3002
- Leyte-Samar Naval Base FPO# 3201
  - Tacloban Naval station, FPO# 3964
  - Tolosa base
  - Jinamoc Seaplane Base
  - Calicoan Naval Base
  - Guiuan Naval Base
  - Tubabao Base
  - Salcedo PT Boat Base
  - Guiuan Naval hospital
  - Manicani Base
- Manicani Island Base FPO# 3864
  - Naval Base at Hinundayan, Leyte, FPO# 3958
- Naval Base Lingayen, Luzon, FPO# 3960
    - Naval Base at San Fernando, La Union, FPO# 3863

== Minor Philippines Bases ==
- Naval Base Puerto Princesa, Palawan, FPO# 3291
- Naval Base Calbayog, Samar, FPO# 3957
- Naval Base at Casiguran Sound, FPO# 1133
- Naval Base at Cotabato, Mindanao, FPO# 1159
- Naval Base at San Antonio, Luzon, FPO# 3001
- Naval Base at Masinloc, Luzon, FPO# 3003
- Naval Base at Batangas, Luzon, FPO# 3004
- Naval Base at Balayan, Luzon, FPO# 3006
- Naval Base at Baler Bay, FPO# 3028
- Naval Base at Davao, Mindanao, FPO# 3042
- Naval Base at Zambonanga, FPO# 3070
- Naval Base at San Jose, Mindoro, FPO# 3100
- Naval Base at Bacolod, Negros, FPO# 3101
- Naval Base at Ormoc, Leyte, FPO# 3102
- Naval Base at Laoag, Luzon, FPO# 3106
- Naval Base at Dingalan, Luzon, FPO# 3107
- Naval Base at Aparri, Luzon, FPO# 3132
- Naval Base at Cebu, FPO# 3133, PT Boat base
- Naval Base at Legaspi, FPO# 3136
- Naval Base at Vigan, FPO# 3138
- Naval Base at Tawi-Tawi Island, FPO# 3144
- Naval Base at Palawan, FPO# 3146
- Naval Base at Batangas Bay, FPO# 3160
- Naval Base at Mactan Island, FPO# 3858, depot, repair, seaplane base
- Naval Base at Cagayan, Mindanao, FPO# 3955
- Naval Base at Buenavista, Mindanao, FPO# 3956
- Naval Base at Iloilo, Panay, FPO# 3959, PT Boat, depot, repair depot
- Naval Base at Masbate, Masbate, FPO# 3961
- Naval Base at Misamis, Mindanao, FPO#3962
- Naval Base at Sarangani, Mindanao, FPO# 3963
- Naval Base at Basilan Island, Mindanao, PT Boats, Puerto Isbela
- Naval Base at Mangarin Bay, Mindoro, PT Boats
- Naval Base at Polloc Harbor
- Naval Base at Santiago Cove depot, PT boat base
- Naval Base at Bacuit, Palawan FPO# 3293
- Naval Base at Coron Bay, Palawan FPO# 3292
- Naval Base at Panaon Island, PT boat base (Liloan)
- Naval Base Bobon Point, Bobon, Samar, PT boat base (Liloan)
- Naval Base Malalag Bay PT boat and small naval base in Davao Gulf
  - Davao field small base

== Gallery ==
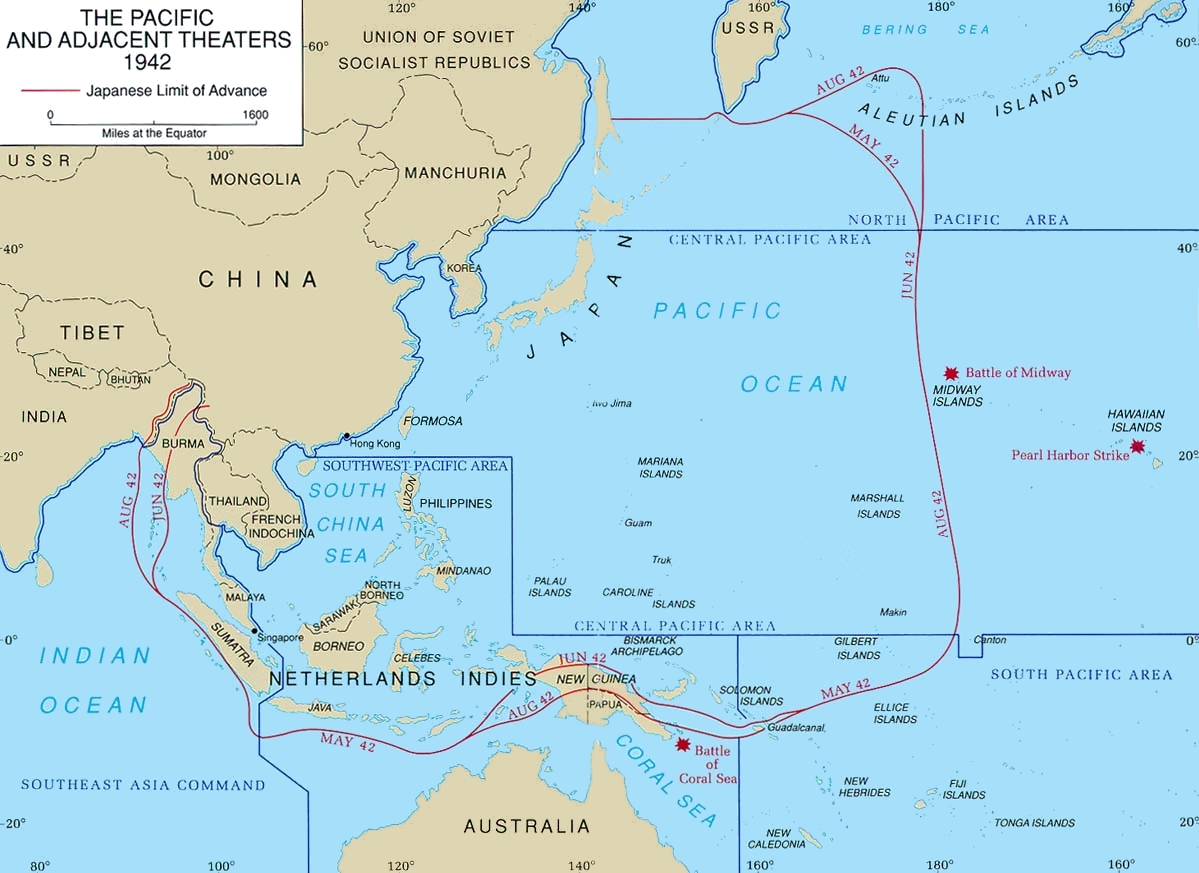
Pacific War Theater Areas map 1942

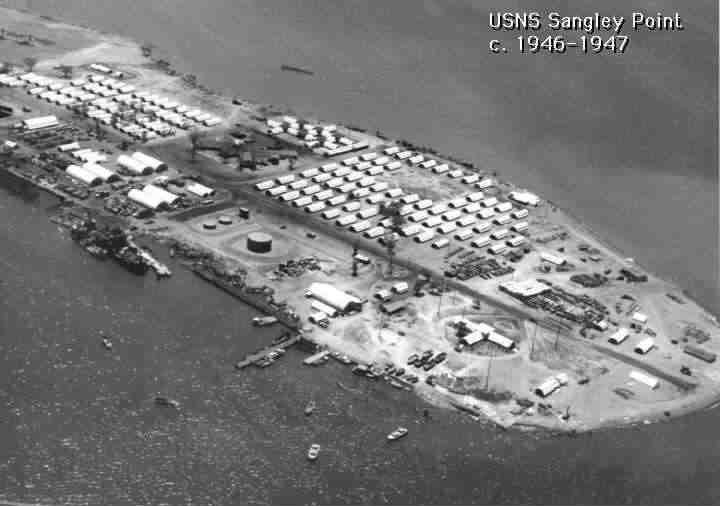
US Naval Station Sangley Point in 1947, with Quonset hut, barracks, shops, supply depot, mess hall and more.

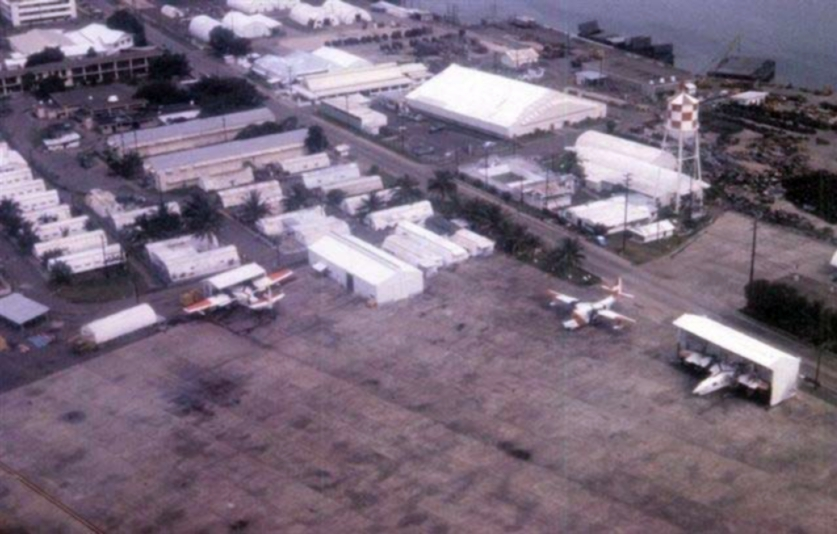
Seaplane Base at Sangley Point.

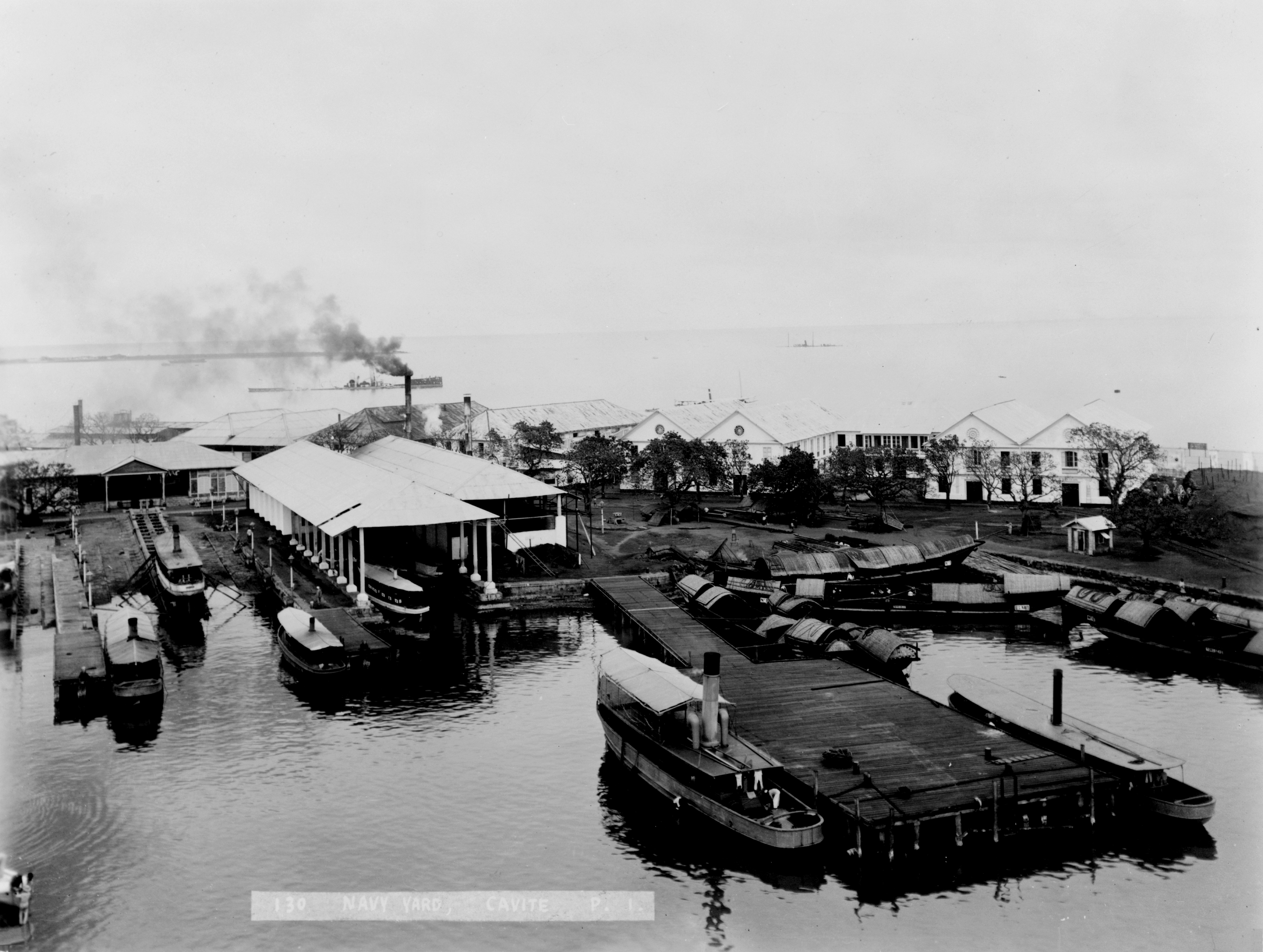
Cavite Navy Yard docks in 1899, year after it became a US Navy Shipyard

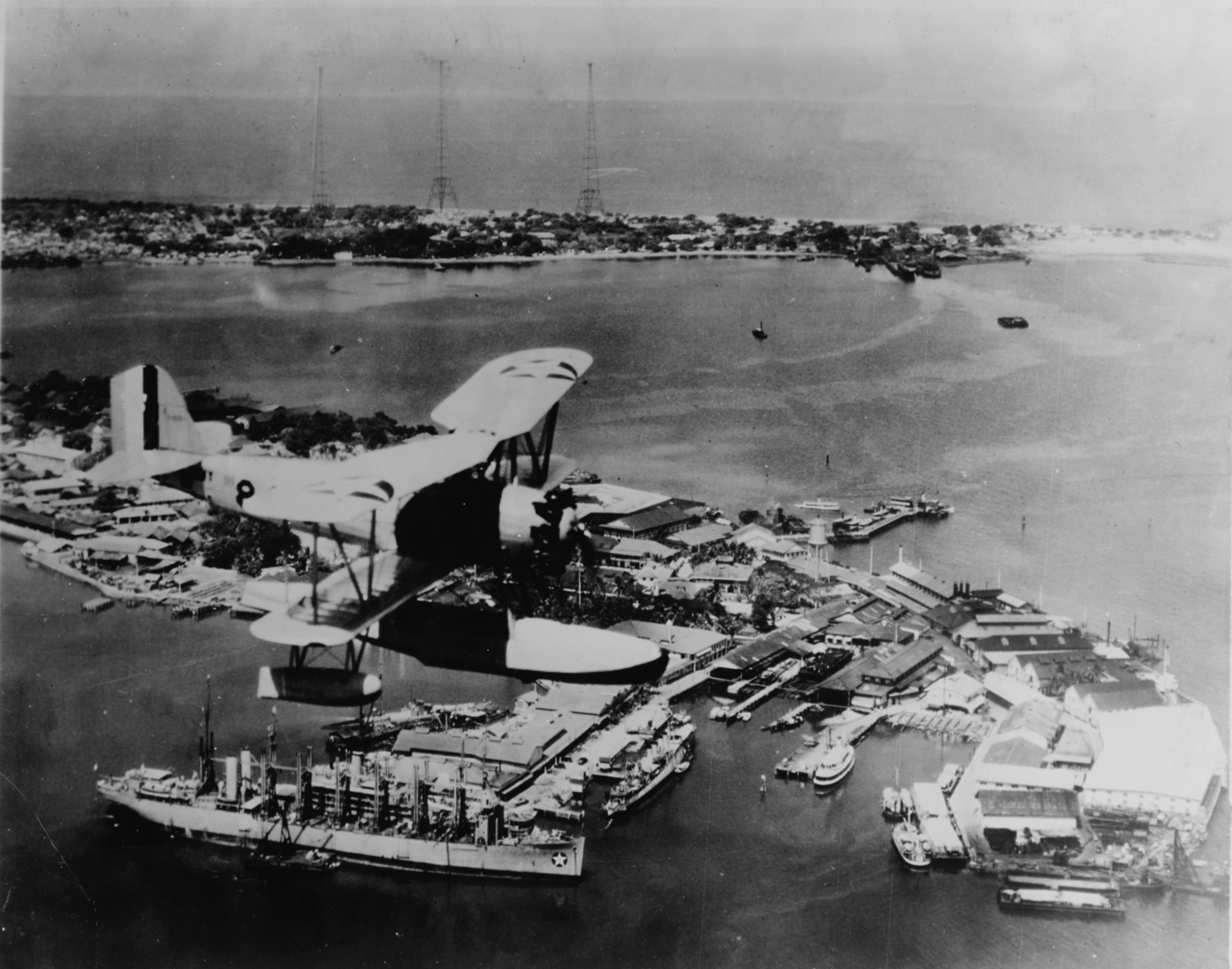
A O2U floatplane flies over the Cavite Navy Yard, in 1930, below seaplane tender USS Jason and Sangley Point

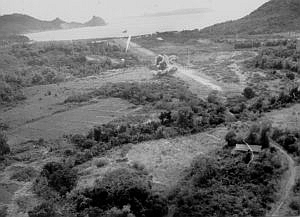
Bataan Peninsula on 24 January 1945, with Mariveles Seaplane base, port and Airfield. Japan is bombing the runway. Mariveles surrendered on April 10, 1942, the start of Bataan Death March. Mariveles was retaken in February 1945

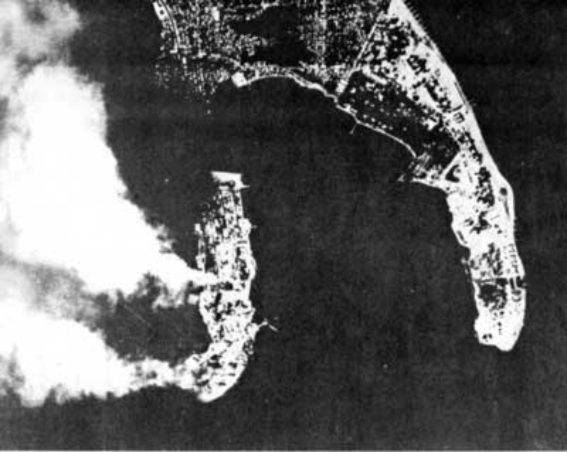
Cavite Navy Yard bombed by Japan on December 10, 1941. Smoke rises from Cavite Navy Yard.

Submarine USS Shark (SS-8) at the Cavite Navy Yard 1911

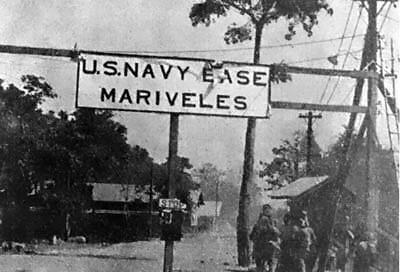
Entrance to Naval Base Mariveles after the fall of Bataan.

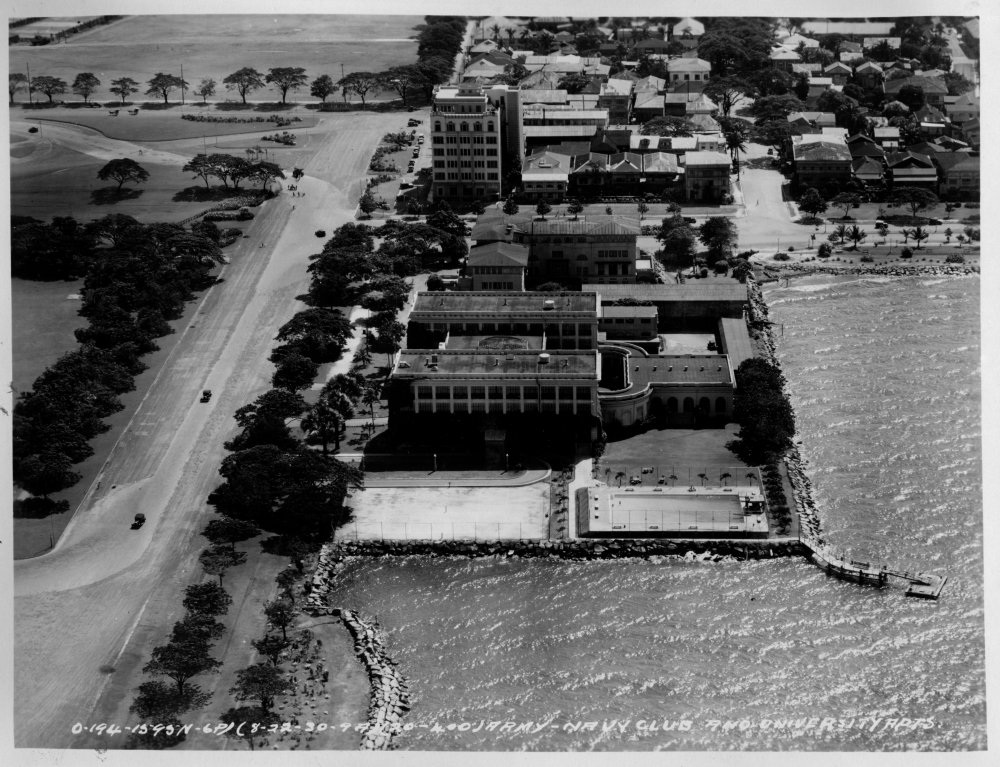
Manila Army and Navy Club

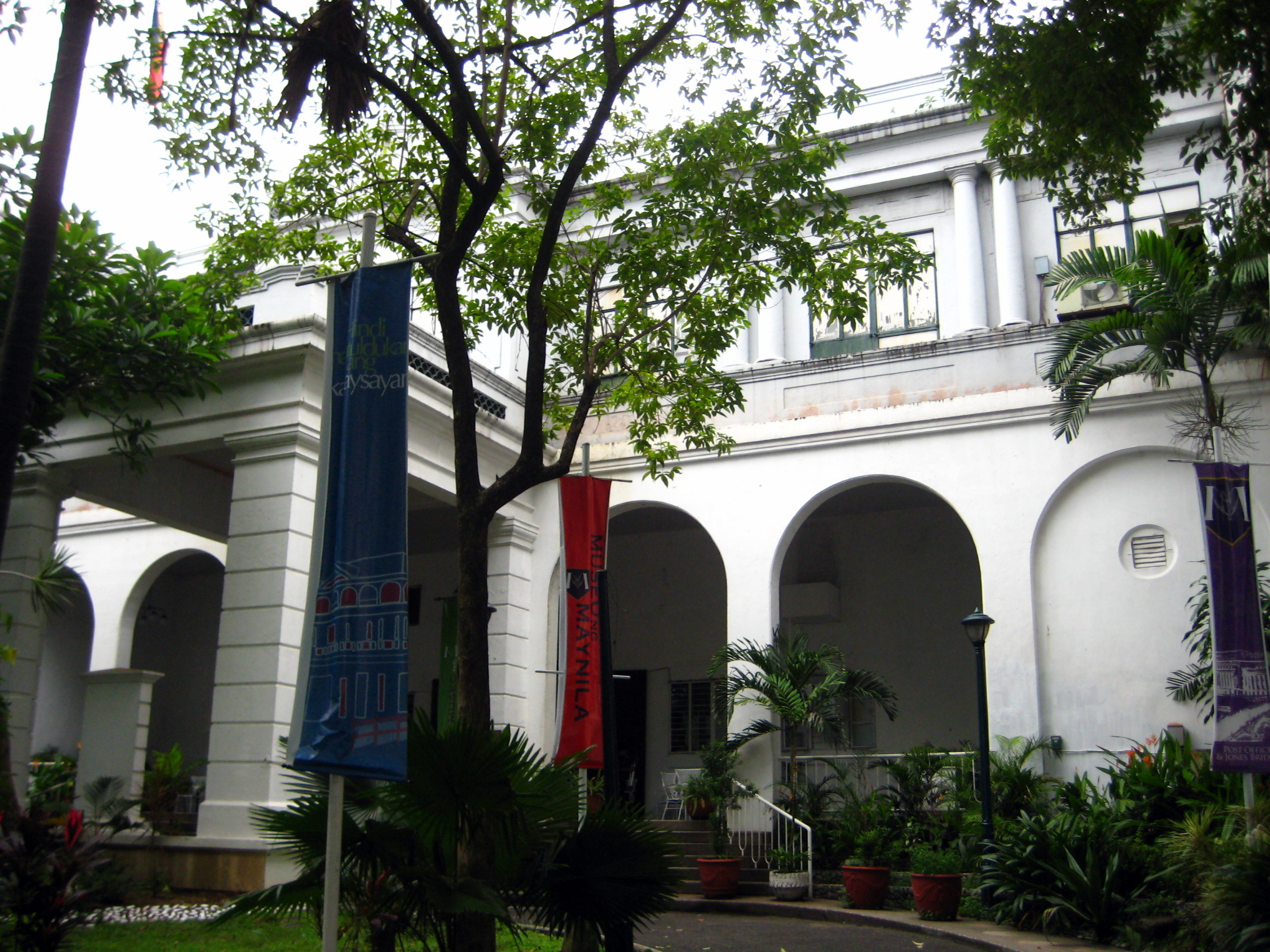
Manila Army and Navy Club

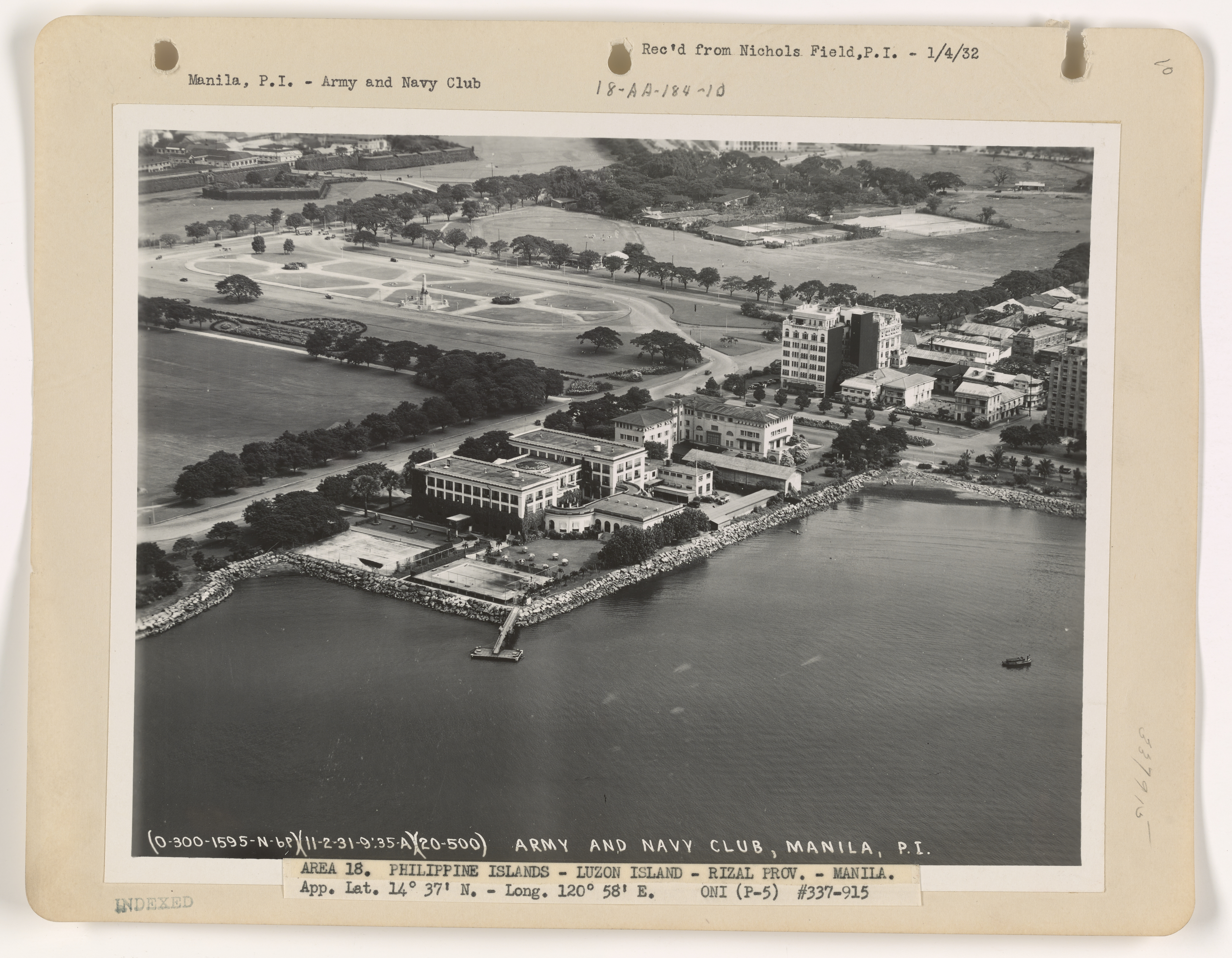
Manila Army and Navy Club in 1932

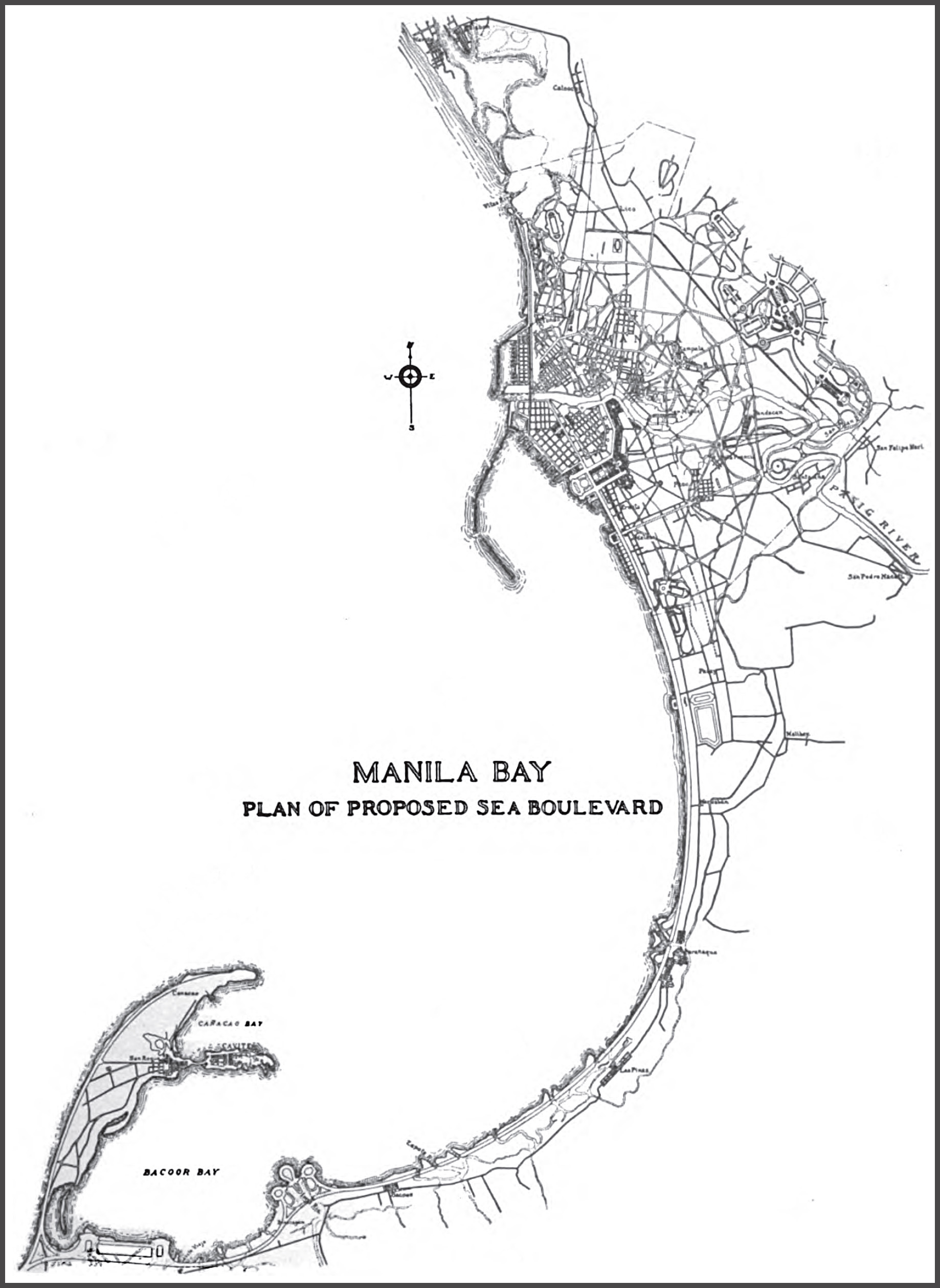
Manila Bay and Cavite in the bay

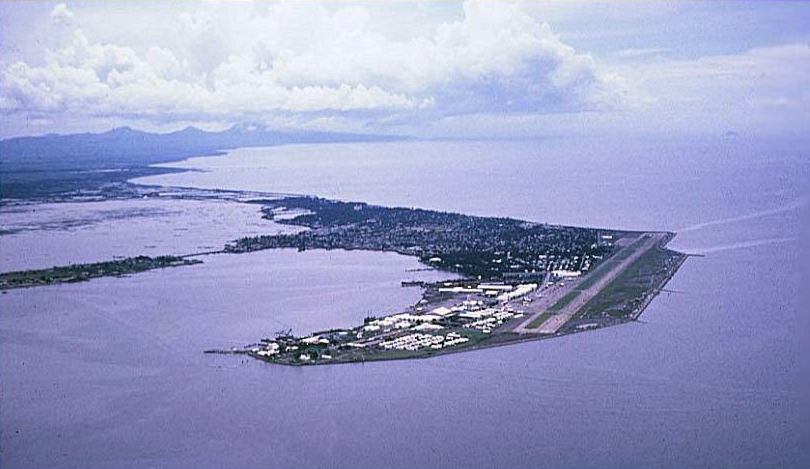
Naval Station Sangley Point in 1964

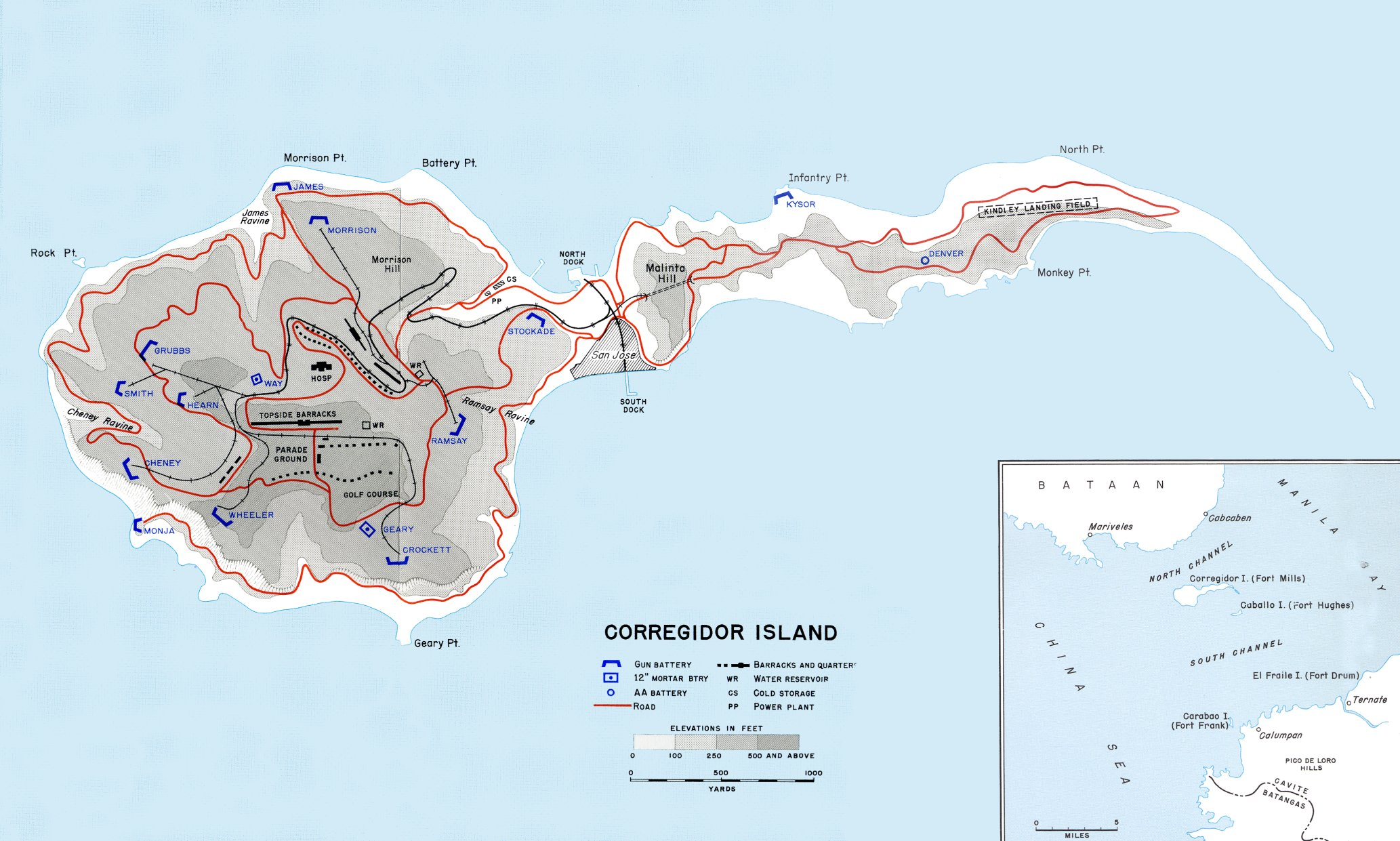
Map of Corregidor Island in 1941

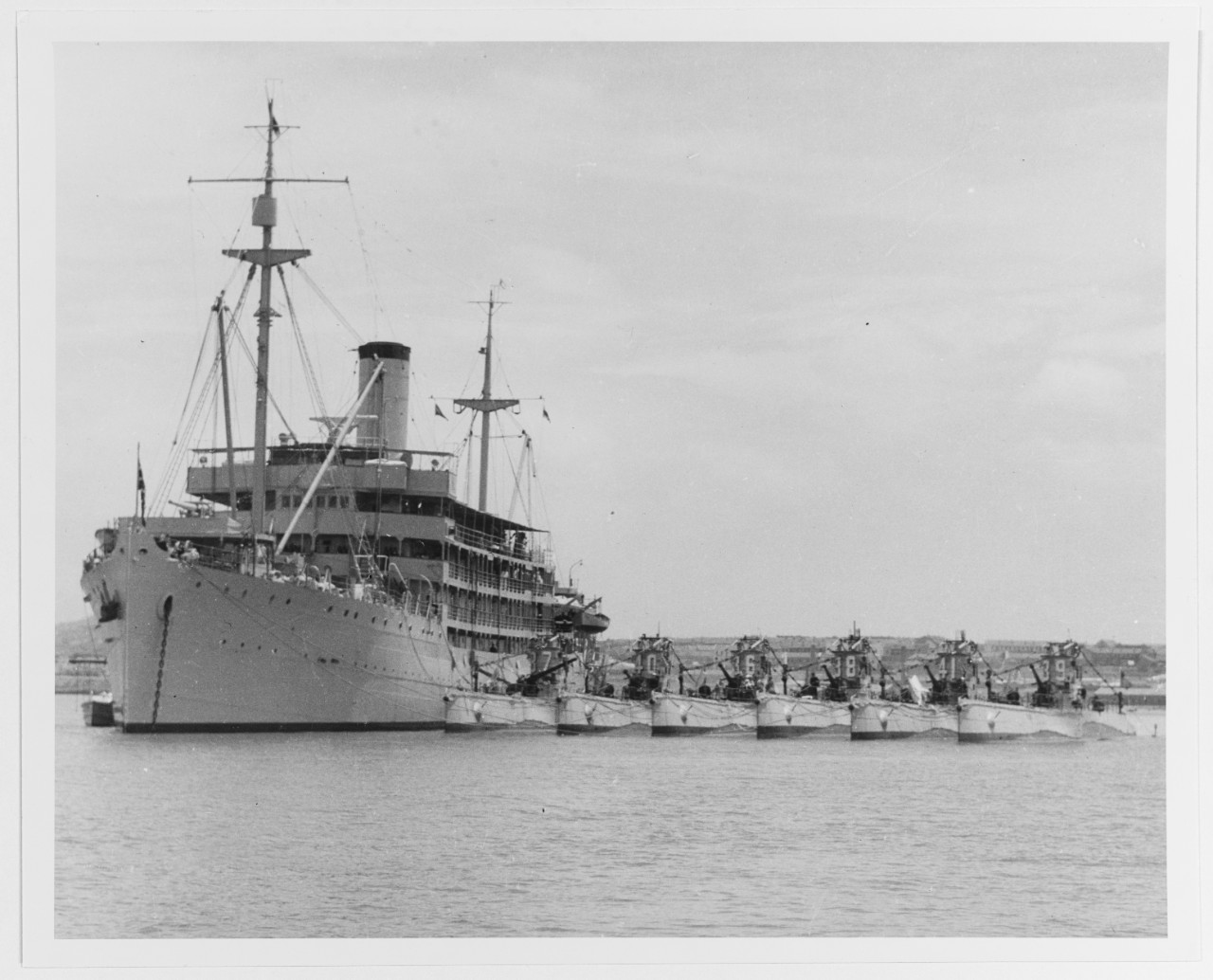
USS Canopus (AS-9) submarine tender in 1932 with S-37; S-40; S-36; S-38; S-41; S-39 at Cavite

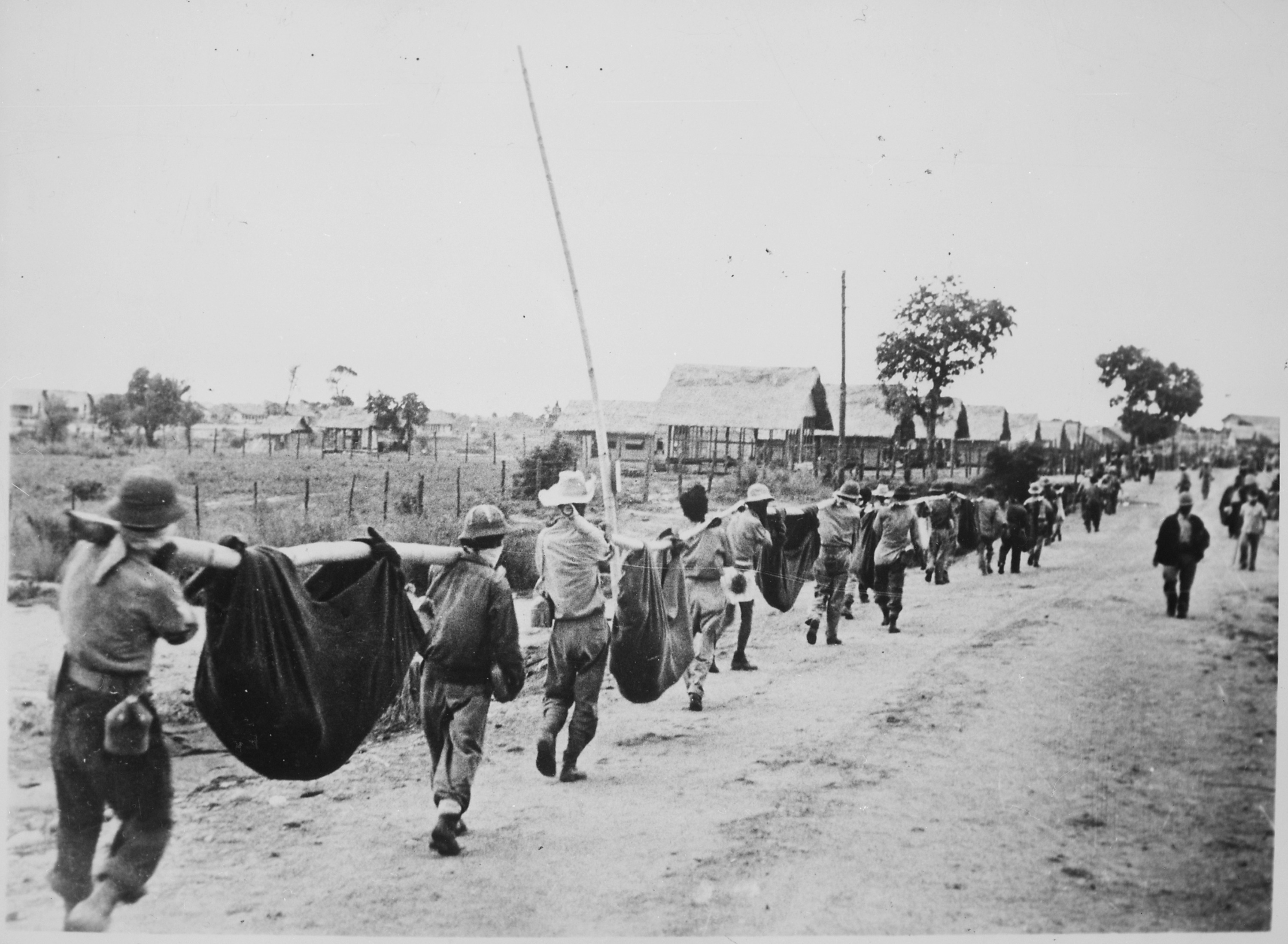
Bataan Death March that started at US Navy port at Mariveles on Bataan Peninsula on April 10, 1942, with US Army, Navy, Marines, Naval Hospital staff and Filipino Troops.

Map Bataan Death March route 1942

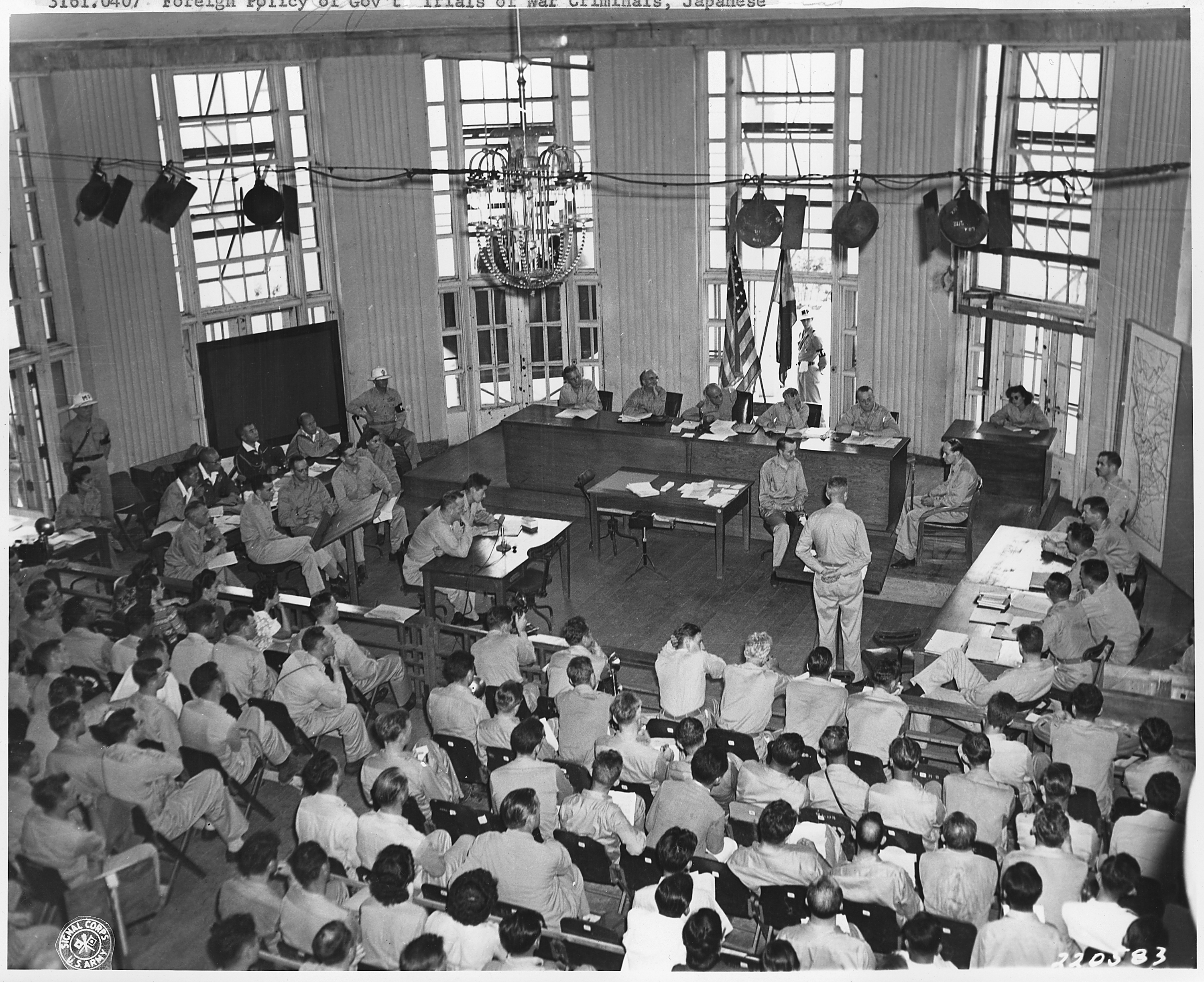
Japanese War Crimes Trials in Manila

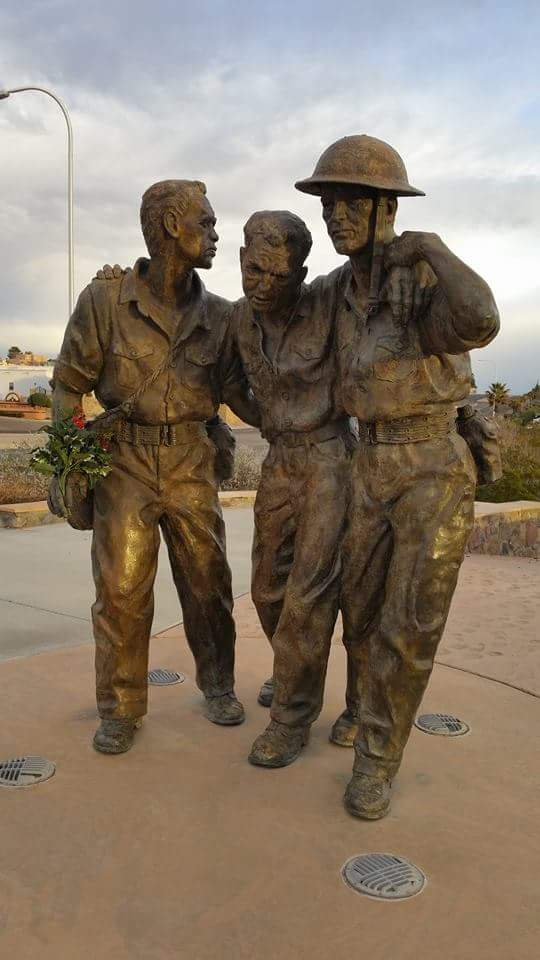
Bataan Death March Memorial Las Cruces, New Mexico

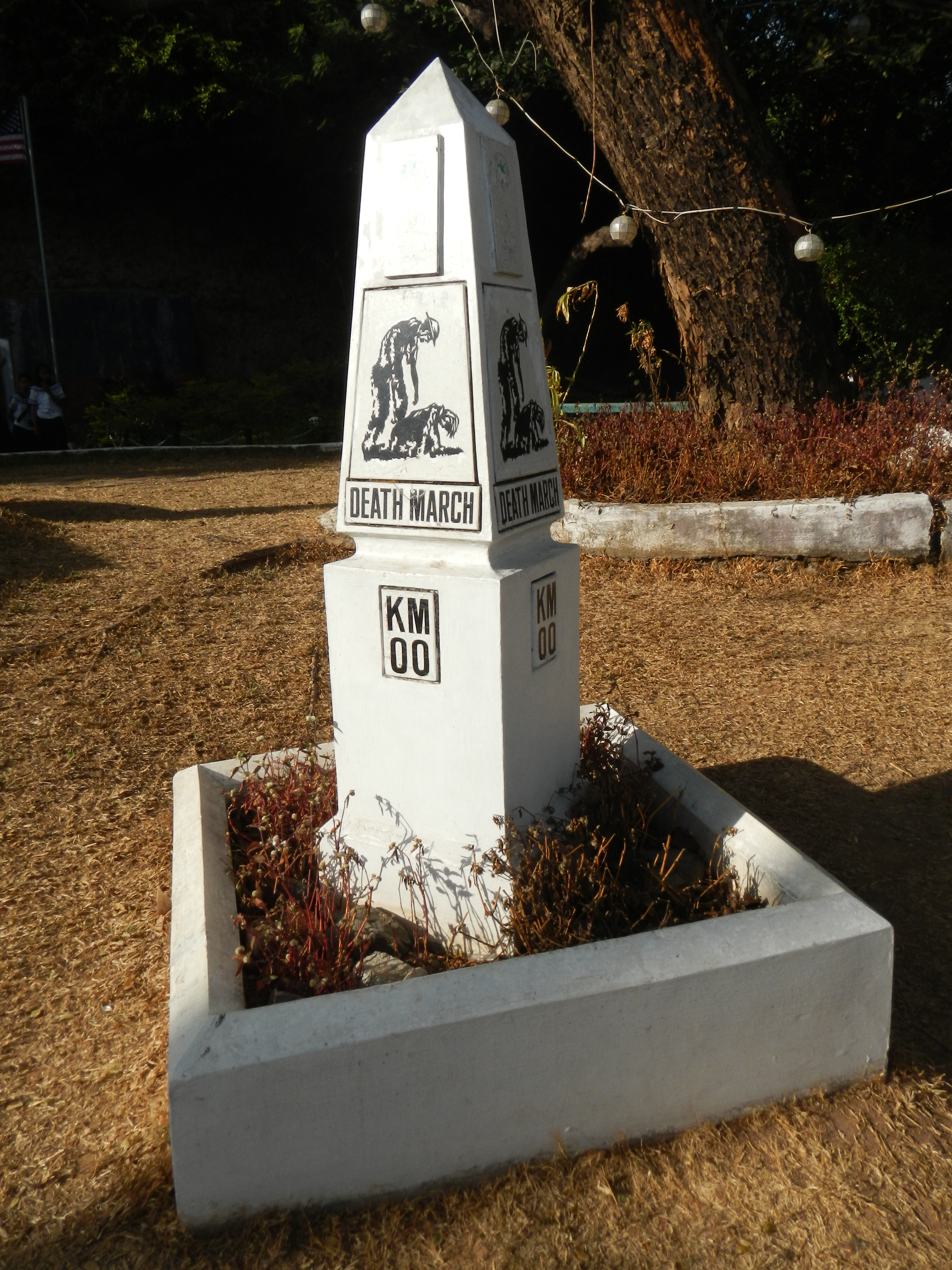
Zero Kilometer Death March Marker in Mariveles

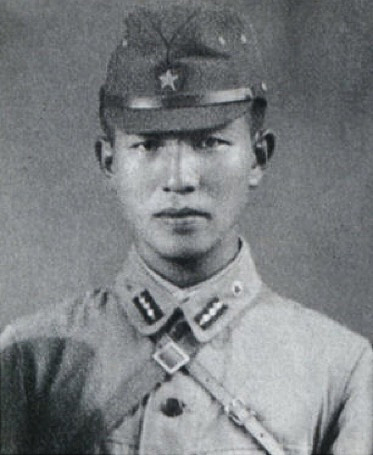
Lieutenant Hiroo Onoda Japanese holdout on Lubang Island, Philippines

South Pacific islands in 1945

== See also ==
- Naval Station San Miguel
- Fort Drum (Philippines)
- Military history of the Philippines during World War II
- Camp Aguinaldo
- Camp Crame
- Fort San Felipe (Cavite)
- Asiatic Squadron
- Women of Valor
- List of memorials to Bataan Death March victims
- US Naval Base Solomons
- US Naval Base New Zealand
