= USS Sarasota =

Haskell-class attack transport

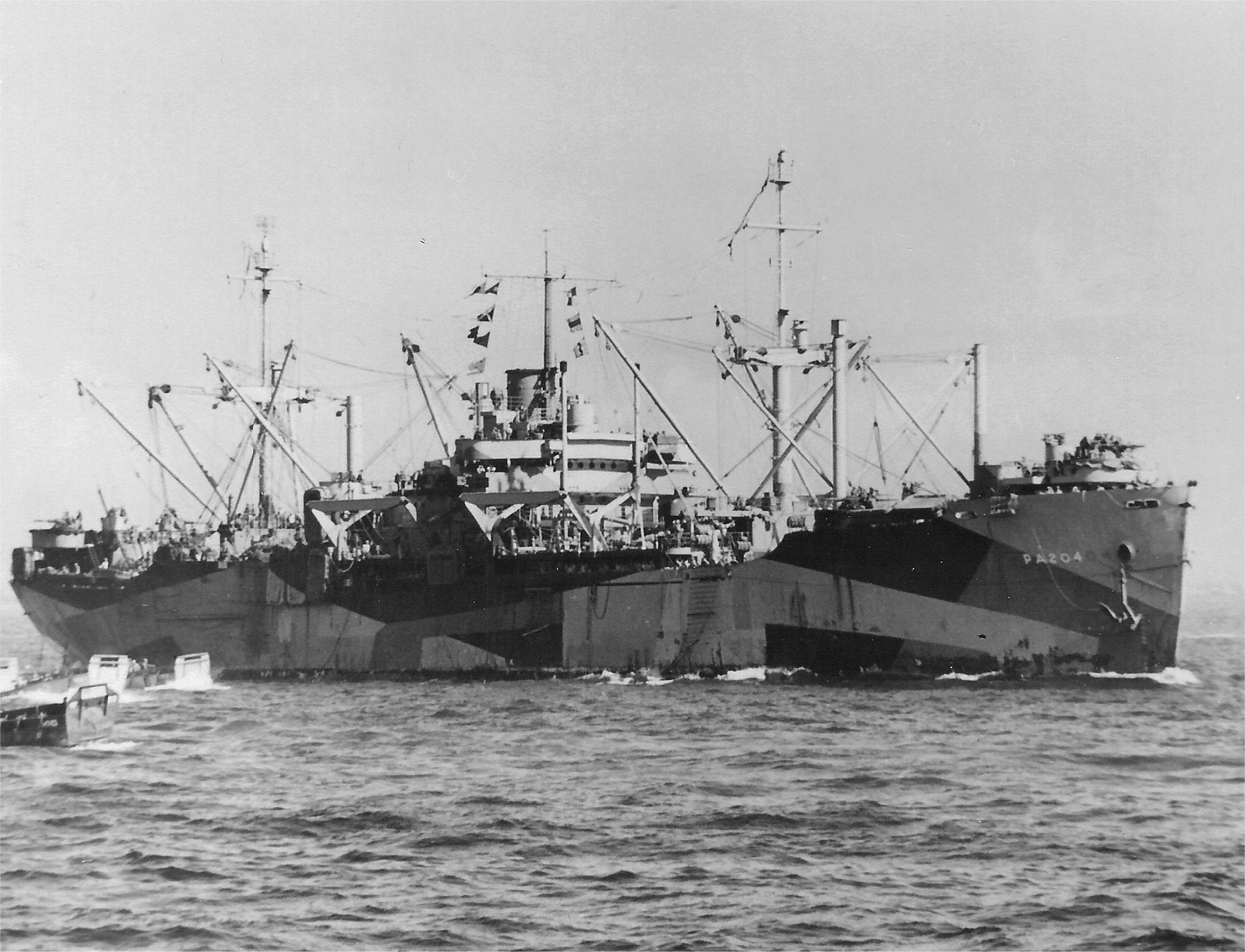
- USS Sarasota (APA-204), at Lingayen Gulf, 8 January 1945.

History

United States
- Name: Sarasota
- Namesake: Sarasota County, Florida
- Ordered: as a Type VC2-S-AP5 hull, MCE hull 552
- Builder: Permanente Metals Corporation, Richmond, California
- Yard number: 552
- Laid down: 11 April 1944
- Launched: 14 June 1944
- Sponsored by: Mrs Clayton L. Shaff
- Commissioned: 16 August 1944
- Decommissioned: 1 August 1946
- Recommissioned: 2 February 1951
- Decommissioned: 2 September 1955
- Reclassified: redesignated Amphibious Transport (LPA-204), 1 January 1969
- Stricken: 1 July 1966
- Identification: Hull symbol: APA-204; Hull symbol: LPA-204; Code letters: NPNM
- Honors and awards: 3 × battle stars for World War II service
- Fate: trade out for scrapping, 1 August 1983, removed, 15 November 1983 scrapping completed, 25 April 1984

General characteristics
- Class & type: Haskell-class attack transport
- Type: Type VC2-S-AP5
- Displacement: 6,873 long tons (6,983 t) (light load); 14,837 long tons (15,075 t) (full load)
- Length: 455 ft (139 m)
- Beam: 62 ft (19 m)
- Draft: 24 ft (7.3 m)
- Installed power: 2 × Babcock & Wilcox header-type boilers, 465 psi (3,210 kPa) 750 °F (399 °C); 8,500 shp (6,300 kW)
- Propulsion: 1 × Westinghouse geared turbine; 1 x propeller
- Speed: 17.7 kn (32.8 km/h; 20.4 mph) (ship's trials)
- Boats & landing craft carried: 2 × LCMs; 1 × open LCPL; 18 × LCVPs; 2 × LCPRs; 1 × closed LCPL (Captain's Gig)
- Capacity: 2,900 long tons (2,900 t) DWT; 150,000 cu ft (4,200 m^{3}) (non-refrigerated)
- Troops: 87 officers, 1,475 enlisted
- Complement: 99 officers, 593 enlisted
- Armament: 1 × 5 in (127 mm)/38 caliber dual purpose gun; 1 × quad 40 mm (1.6 in) Bofors anti-aircraft (AA) gun mounts; 4 × twin 40mm Bofors (AA) gun mounts; 10 × single 20 mm (0.8 in) Oerlikon cannons AA mounts

Service record
- Part of: TransRon 14
- Operations: Battle of Luzon Lingayen Gulf landings (9 January 1945); Manila Bay-Bicol operation Zambales-Subic Bay (29–31 January 1945); Assault and occupation of Okinawa Gunto (1–22 April 1945)
- Awards: China Service Medal; American Campaign Medal; Combat Action Ribbon; Asiatic–Pacific Campaign Medal; World War II Victory Medal; National Defense Service Medal; Philippine Republic Presidential Unit Citation; Philippine Liberation Medal

USS Sarasota (APA/LPA-204) was a Haskell-class attack transport that saw service with the US Navy in World War II, Korean War Era and after. She was of the VC2-S-AP5 Victory ship design type. Sarasota was named for Sarasota County, Florida.

== Construction ==
Sarasota was laid down under Maritime Commission (MARCOM) contract, MCV hull 552, on 11 April 1944, by the Permanente Metals Corporation, Yard No. 2, Richmond, California; launched on 14 June 1944; sponsored by Mrs. Clayton L. Shaff; acquired by the Navy on 16 August 1944; and commissioned the same day.

== Service history ==
=== World War II ===
Following shakedown, Sarasota embarked Naval Construction Battalion units and departed California on 21 October. On 9 November, she arrived in Seeadler Harbor, Manus.

==== Explosion of Mount Hood ====
The next day, ammunition ship USS Mount Hood carrying approximately 3,800 long tons (3,900 t) of ordnance material, exploded, causing damage to ships and men within 2,000 yd (1.8 km; 6,000 ft). Immediately afterward, Sarasota's small boats carried first aid parties to stricken ships and craft, and her sick bay took in more seriously wounded personnel for emergency treatment.

==== Invasion of Luzon ====
Two days later, the APA steamed to Hollandia and during the next week, transported troops and equipment to Biak, Mios Woendi, and Milne Bay, then returned to Manus. On 27 November, she sailed again, and after calling at Finschhafen, put into Empress Augusta Bay, Bougainville, to load units of the 2d Battalion, 129th Regimental Combat Team, 37th Infantry Division. Landing exercises at Lae followed; and, on 21 December, she returned to Manus to stage for the invasion of Luzon.

As flagship of Transport Division 8, Sarasota got underway with TU 79.3.3 on 31 December. On 8 January 1945, having survived Japanese kamikaze attacks, she approached her destination. On 9 January, she rode in Lingayen Gulf as her boats took the troops into "Crimson Beach" near the town of Lingayen.

After the landings, Sarasota steamed to Leyte, transferred casualties she had received from the beaches of Lingayen Gulf; and, on 21 January, loaded troops of the 34th Regimental Combat Team, 24th Infantry Division, in preparation for Operation Mike VII, the landing in Zambales Province, Luzon.

On 26 January, Sarasota again sailed north. Three days later, she landed the assault troops on "Blue Beach", west of San Antonio, then departed the area.

==== Invasion of Okinawa ====
Returning to Leyte, she remained through February. In March, she embarked men and equipment of the 2nd Battalion, 381st Regiment, 96th Infantry Division; conducted training operations, and, on the 27th steamed from Philippine waters.

On 1 April, she stood off the Hagushi beaches of Okinawa as her LCMs and DUKWs (popularly pronounced "duck") landed the troops on the "White Beaches". Their equipment followed and, by 4 April, Sarasota had completed offloading. She then shifted to Kerama Retto, assisted in offloading the damaged attack transport USS Henrico and prepared for the assault on Ie Shima.

===== Invasion of Ie Shima =====
(Iejima (伊江島) is an island in Okinawa Prefecture, Japan, lying a few kilometers off the Motobu Peninsula of Okinawa Honto.) On the 16th, she landed units of the 305th Regimental Combat Team on that island off the Motobu Peninsula. Manny Espinoza, Seaman, of Sarasota was wounded on the Beach, and was awarded the Purple Heart Medal. US journalist Ernie Pyle died there. There is a monument dedicated to his memory on the southern part of the island. Every year on the weekend closest to his death, 18 April, there is a memorial service.

==== Return to US West Coast ====
Three days later, she returned to the Hagushi anchorage and, on 22 April, departed the Ryūkyūs for the Marianas.

At the end of April, Sarasota disembarked Okinawa casualties at Saipan. On 2 May, she sailed for the Solomons, whence she carried general cargo, Marines, Army hospitalmen, and Navy passengers to Guam. From there, she transported casualties to Pearl Harbor; then continued on to San Francisco.

==== Return to Okinawa ====
After availability at Seattle, she embarked Army troops and, on 18 July, again headed for Okinawa. She arrived in the Hagushi anchorage on 12 August and began disembarking her reinforcement troops and, offloading her cargo. Three days later, hostilities ceased.

==== Operation "Magic Carpet" ====
On 29 August, the APA shifted to Naha to load her first contingent of occupation troops, units of the XIV Corps. On 8 September, she disembarked those troops at Jinsen, Korea. On 14 September, she returned to Okinawa, whence on 1 October, she delivered marines to Chinwangtao. Following offloading, she assumed station ship duties in the Tientsin-Taku area; and, at the end of November, she was reassigned to transport duties, this time with Operation Magic Carpet to carry servicemen back to the United States.

Sailing to Sasebo in early December, she embarked units of the 5th Marine Division and got underway for San Diego, arriving on 24 December. Between 9 January and 19 February 1946, she completed a second "Magic Carpet" run; then prepared for inactivation.

=== Post-World War II operations ===
In early March, she moved to San Francisco for overhaul; and in June, she was towed to Stockton, where she was decommissioned on 1 August and berthed with the 19th (Inactive) Fleet.

Four years later, Sarasota was ordered activated. Recommissioned on 3 February 1951, she conducted training operations and underwent alterations into June. On 20 June, she sailed for Panama; and, on 13 July, she arrived at Norfolk, Virginia, her new home port. For the remainder of 1951, the APA trained Marine Corps units in exercises off the east coast and in the Caribbean. With the new year, 1952, however, she sailed east, with units of the 8th Marines embarked, and for the next three and one-half months operated in the Mediterranean as a unit of the US 6th Fleet. Relieved on 8 May, she returned to the United States and resumed amphibious training exercises off the east coast. From May to October 1954, she again deployed to the Mediterranean. That 6th Fleet tour was again followed by training exercises, including midshipman and reservist cruises; and, in April 1955, she arrived at Atlantic Reserve Fleet, Charleston to again commence inactivation.

=== Final decommission ===
Decommissioned on 2 September 1955, she remained in reserve until transferred to MARCOM in June 1966. Her name was struck from the Navy List on 1 July. Since then, into 1974, Sarasota was still in the custody of MARCOM, berthed in the James River as a unit of the National Defense Reserve Fleet.

=== Fate ===
There appears to be some confusion as to the fate of this ship. In one Navy Vessel Register (NVR), she is listed as being disposed of in target practice on 1 November 1979. In another, she is listed as being disposed of by the Maritime Administration (MARAD) on 1 May 1982. In November 1983, the Sarasota Herald-Tribune reported that MARAD was storing the ship in the James River. In July 1988, the Sarasota Herald-Tribune reported that according to a Navy spokeswoman the ship had been sold to be scrapped overseas in 1983. According to NavSource and MARAD, the ship was traded out to Waterman Steamship Corporation, who resold her to Balbao Desquaces Maritimos, S.A., for scrapping, 1 August 1983. She was removed from the Reserve Fleet, 15 November 1983, and was completely scrapped by 25 April 1984.

== Awards ==
Sarasota earned 3 battle stars during World War II.

== Bibliography ==
Online resources

- "Sarasota". Dictionary of American Naval Fighting Ships. Navy Department, Naval History and Heritage Command. 2 September 2015. This article incorporates text from this source, which is in the public domain.
- "Kaiser Permanente No. 2, Richmond CA". Shipbuilding History. 13 October 2010.
- "USS Sarasota (LPA-204)". NavSource. 29 July 2016.
- "SARASOTA (APA-204)". United States Department of Transportation. Archived from the original on 4 September 2014.
- "Sarasota (APA 204)". Naval Vessel Register. 16 April 2001.
- "Sarasota (LPA 204)". Naval Vessel Register. 5 March 2007.

Newspapers

- Nugent, Russ (28 November 1983). "Visitor Remembers USS Sarasota 1951 invasion of Lido Beach". Sarasota Herald-Tribune. pp. 1B, 3B.
- Zaloudek, Mark (4 July 1988). "Ex-Sailors Won't Scrap Memories of Ship". Sarasota Herald-Tribune. p. 3BCE.
